= List of scheduled monuments in Blaenau Gwent =

Scheduled monuments in Blaenau Gwent, Wales

Blaenau Gwent is a unitary authority area in eastern South Wales. It has three heavily industrialised valleys, which are the setting for the eight post-medieval scheduled monuments. The uplands have three, possibly four prehistoric monuments, and a medieval site is in the south of the borough. There are 13 scheduled sites in total. The county borough was part of the historic county of Monmouthshire (historic), although shifting boundaries mean Y Domen Fawr round cairn was formerly in Glamorgan.

Scheduled monuments have statutory protection. It is illegal to disturb the ground surface or any standing remains. The compilation of the list is undertaken by Cadw Welsh Historic Monuments, which is an executive agency of the National Assembly of Wales. The list of scheduled monuments below is supplied by Cadw with additional material from RCAHMW and Glamorgan-Gwent Archaeological Trust.

== Scheduled monuments in Blaenau Gwent ==
Image	Name	Site type	Community	Location	Details	Period	SAM No & Refs
	Y Domen Fawr round cairn	Round cairn	Ebbw Vale	51.757°N 3.2095°W, SO166170	Early Bronze Age burial cairn	Prehistoric (Bronze Age)	GM588
	Afon Sirhowy Hut Circle	Hut circle settlement	Tredegar	51.799°N 3.2788°W, SO119119	Bronze Age hut circle, 5.3m in diameter	Prehistoric (Bronze Age)	MM347
	Twyn Bryn March round cairn	Round cairn	Tredegar	51.8028°N 3.2524°W, SO137123	The best preserved of a group of Bronze Age burial cairns, 5m across	Prehistoric (Bronze Age)	MM344
	Cefn Manmoel cross-ridge dyke	Cross Ridge Dyke	Cwm, (also Argoed, Caerphilly)	51.7442°N 3.2018°W, SO171057	Linear defensive earthwork which may be from neolithic or medieval period. This site crosses the border into Caerphilly	Unknown	MM345
	St Illtyd's Motte	Motte	Llanhilleth	51.7105°N 3.1343°W, SO217019	Castle Mound next to the church. (Also known as Twyn Motte) Probably destroyed in 1233	Medieval (Norman)	MM141
	Sirhowy Ironworks	Industrial monument	Tredegar	51.783°N 3.2436°W, SO143101	Ironworks from 1778, site now open to the public	Post-Medieval/Modern (18th century)	MM185
Trefil quarry workings	Trefil Quarries North	Quarry	Tredegar	51.8179°N 3.2818°W, SO117140	Limestone Quarry opened in 1794	Post-Medieval/Modern (18th century)	MM338
	Clydach Coal Level	Tramroad	Brynmawr	51.8024°N 3.161°W, SO200121	Rock-cut coal levels from 1812 and tramroad	Post-Medieval/Modern (19th century)	MM264
Cholera Cemetery for Tredegar Iron works	Cefn Golau	Cholera cemetery	Tredegar	51.7603°N 3.2491°W, SO138075	Cemetery from the 1830s and 40s Cholera epidemics	Post-Medieval/Modern (19th century)	MM287
Clydach Gorge looking toward Brynmawr	Clydach Rail Road	Tramroad	Brynmawr	51.8033°N 3.1584°W, SO202122	Stretch of Clydach Rail Road near Brynmawr, with causeway and stone arched bridge known as Hafod Arch	Post-Medieval/Modern (19th century)	MM263
Steam Pump at Marine Colliery, Cwm	Marine Colliery Pumping Engine	Industrial monument	Cwm	51.7315°N 3.1759°W, SO188042	Steam pumping engine, relocated to near the colliery entrance	Post-Medieval/Modern (19th century)	MM218
	Mynydd Bedwellty Winding Engine	Industrial monument	Tredegar	51.7448°N 3.2278°W, SO153058	Incline haulage winding engine from the 1850s	Post-Medieval/Modern (19th century)	MM181
	Trefil Tramroad	Tramroad	Tredegar	51.8044°N 3.2573°W, SO134125	Early Tramroad connecting to Trefil Quarries	Post-Medieval/Modern (19th century)	MM339

== See also ==
- List of Cadw properties
- List of castles in Wales
- List of hill forts in Wales
- Historic houses in Wales
- List of monastic houses in Wales
- List of museums in Wales
- List of Roman villas in Wales
- Grade II* listed buildings in Blaenau Gwent
