= Philip Weekes =

Welsh mining engineer (1920–2003)

Philip Gordon Weekes CBE (12 June 1920 – 26 June 2003) was a Welsh mining engineer. As the National Coal Board's manager of the South Wales coalfields, Weekes played an important role mediating between the two sides of the miners' strike of 1984-85 in England, Scotland and Wales.

== Early life ==
Weekes was born in the village of Nantybwch, near Tredegar in Monmouthshire, the son of a pharmacist. Weekes was educated at Tredegar County School, and gained a scholarship from the Tredegar Iron and Coal Company to University College, Cardiff, where he graduated in mining engineering. He joined the Royal Air Force in 1942, but eyesight problems prevented him from becoming a pilot, and he returned to mining.

== Career ==
On his 26th birthday, Weekes was appointed manager of Wyllie Colliery, in Wyllie, Caerphilly, and in 1948 moved to be manager of the Oakdale Colliery in the Sirhowy Valley. In 1950, his successes in labour relations led the Colonial Office, then under the leadership of fellow South Welsh coalman Jim Griffiths, to send him to Nigeria following riots in the Enugu mines. He dismissed suggestions that he should have his own armed guards, and his first decision was to demand the withdrawal of police and troops so that negotiations could proceed in a new, calm and neutral environment. He turned the situation around - miners went back to work and peace was restored. A colonial official reported that Weekes had done "rather well for a grammar school boy". He returned home to become a South Wales colliery agent in 1951.

In 1964, he was appointed director of studies at the National Coal Board (NCB) staff college, and, three years later, became production director in the south Midlands area. In 1970, he moved to the NCB's London head office, Hobart House, as chief mining engineer, and, the following year, became director-general of mining. Weekes was the South Western Area General Manager from 1973 to 1985. This was considered an odd post to accept, because mining in South Wales was by then a tiring and ailing limb of the industry. However, Weekes did much to give it new life and enhanced respect, uniting men, management and unions. From 1977 to 1984, he was also an NCB board member.

=== Miners' strike ===
Frustrated equally by the confrontational styles of the leadership of both sides in the miners' strike of 1984-85, Weekes strove for a peaceful outcome. Early in 1985, as the dispute was waning, Weekes refused an order from the NCB chairman Ian MacGregor to offer redundancy to every miner in his coalfield, irrespective of whether or not they were working at a profitable pit. Before the strike began, he privately urged local union leaders to heed the message from their members, who had voted against industrial action in pithead ballots. Weekes thought that strike leader Arthur Scargill's flaw was to go into the strike without a proper ballot, and was aggrieved that a militant minority in South Wales had picketed the majority who wanted to go on working.

Weekes also secretly negotiated with the Chief Constable of the South Wales Constabulary, David East, and with local union leaders, to ensure that the dispute was policed by local constabularies - in order to avoid the violent clashes seen elsewhere during the strikes. He made sure that the unions provided sufficient cover to maintain pumps and safety inspections so that work could resume promptly once the strike was over. Towards the end, while touring his pits, he was observed talking to pickets at the gates of Bedwas Navigation Colliery. During the conversation, he lit a cigarette - and the gesture was interpreted in high places as "collaboration".

His personal papers, which include diaries for the period of the Miners' Strike are held at the National Library of Wales.

Long after his retirement, he was still sought him out in the street by miners anxious to wish him well. Kim Howells, the Member of Parliament for Pontypridd from 1989 to 2010, and a National Union of Mineworkers official at the time of the strike, commented after Weekes' death: "There were many who believed that Phil Weekes, a brilliant mining engineer and communicator, should have been made Chairman of the Coal Board in the early Eighties. If that had come about the story of mining in Britain would be very different."

=== Post-strike career ===
Weekes threw himself into post-mining life with vigour; he gained his pilot's licence, then, in 1992, became chairman of the National Garden Festival, held that year in Ebbw Vale a scheme that transformed old steelworks and colliery tips into gardens and exhibition spaces. When workers at Tower Colliery bought out their mine, he chaired their enterprise from 1994 to 1999 - his regard for Tower dated from April 1962, when he was the first manager to enter the colliery following an explosion in which nine men died. From 1992, he was also chairman of the Silent Valley waste disposal company in Cwm. He was a member of the Prince of Wales' committee, the BBC advisory council, the IBA Wales and governor of United College of the Atlantic. He was appointed CBE in the 1993 New Year Honours.

== Personal life ==
Weekes died on 26 June 2003 in Penarth, Glamorgan. He was married with two sons and two daughters. His younger son predeceased him by two years.

== See also ==
- Mining in Wales
- National Coal Board
- Miners' strike 1984–85
