= Tredegar Works =

Tredegar Works may refer to:

- Tredegar Iron Works in Richmond, Virginia
- Tredegar Iron and Coal Company in Wales
