= Cefn Manmoel =

Coordinates: 51.7521°N 3.2094°W

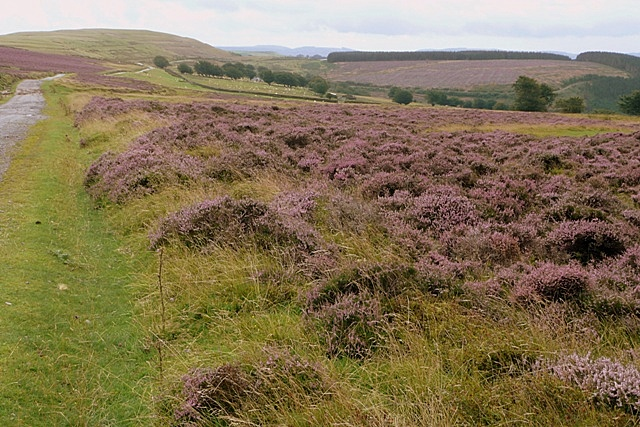

Cefn Manmoel is the name given to the broad ridge of high ground between the Sirhowy Valley and Ebbw Vale in the Valleys region of South Wales. It straddles the boundary between the unitary areas of Caerphilly and Blaenau Gwent.

The NNW-SSE aligned ridge reaches a height of 504 metres (1,654 ft) above sea-level at OS grid ref SO 166072. To the south it drops away to a broad saddle southeast of the village of Manmoel, beyond which lies Mynydd Pen-y-fan.

Parts of both its eastern and western flanks are afforested with conifer plantations such as at Coed y Rhyd and at Coed y Llanerch.

== Geology ==
The entire hill is composed of sandstones and mudstones dating from the Carboniferous Period. There are also numerous coal seams within the sequence, most of which have been worked. The upper part of the hill including the summit plateau is formed from the Pennant Sandstone, a rock assigned to the Carboniferous Upper Coal Measures. The flanks of the hill owe their steepness in part to the action of glacial ice during the succession of ice ages.

There are numerous abandoned quarries on the steep flanks of the ridge.

== Access ==
Significant parts of the hill are moorland and have been mapped as open country under the CRoW Act thus giving a right of access to walkers. Similar rights apply to some of the afforested areas. There are a number of public footpaths and other public rights of way over the hill. The Sirhowy Valley Ridgeway Walk and the Ebbw Valley Walk follow some of these routes.
