= Tredegar Ironworks =

Tredegar Ironworks may refer to either of the two similarly named nineteenth-century ironworks:

- Tredegar Iron Works, Virginia, United States
- Tredegar Iron and Coal Company, South Wales
