= Parc Bryn Bach =

Country park in Blaenau Gwent, Wales

Parc Bryn Bach Bryn Bach Park
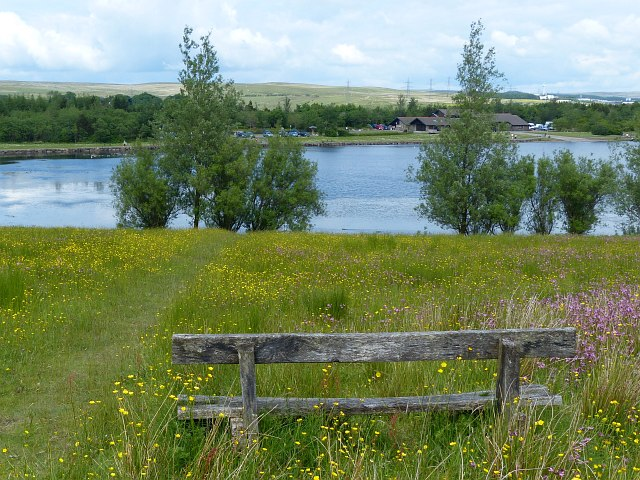
- A view from a bench in a meadow overlooking the Bryn Bach lake with the visitor centre in the distance
- Interactive map of Parc Bryn Bach; Bryn Bach Park
- Type: Country park
- Location: Blaenau Gwent, Wales
- Nearest town: Tredegar
- Coordinates: 51°46′57″N 3°16′03″W
- Area: 340 acres (140 ha)
- Elevation: 280 m (920 ft)
- Created: 1980
- Operator: Aneurin Leisure Trust
- Status: Open year-round
- Awards: Green Flag Award
- Website: www.parcbrynbach.co.uk

Parc Bryn Bach (also known as Bryn Bach Park) is a country park, nature reserve and recreational ground located in Blaenau Gwent, situated on the outskirts of Tredegar in the South Wales Valleys.

The site covers 340 acres (140 ha) of reclaimed industrial mining land and is home to a recreational lake, adventure park, a driving range, golf course, a campsite and bunk house.

The site is owned by Blaenau Gwent County Borough Council and managed by the Aneurin Leisure Trust.

== History ==
Parc Bryn Bach is located on the site of a former iron ore "patch" mine, a type of Open-pit mining where small areas are excavated close to the surface to extract ore. The first recorded excavation took place in 1747 and grew over the next three centuries expanding with the opening of Sirhowy Ironworks in 1778 and Tredegar Ironworks in 1800.

The newly opened ironworks required a supply of water for their steam powered machinery which led to the excavation of the pond in 1818. During the same period iron excavation was expanded with the excavation of bell pits and the opening of collieries for the first time leading to the abandonment of the original patch mines. The mining activity destroyed the local landscape and environment with the creation of the industrial waste alongside the excavation.

The collieries remained active through the 19th and 20th centuries contributing greatly to the boom of the South Wales Coalfield throughout the Industrial Revolution and the early 20th century.

In 1926, miners from the Bryn Bach pits took part in the general strike in protest of the poor and dangerous working conditions miners faced. During the strikes some miners were to be found foraging for coal to heat their homes in the old patch mines which were perceived as less dangerous.

The 1926 strike damaged the mining industry which began the process of decline in the South Wales pits. Following the Aberfan disaster in 1966, large scale land reclamation began across the South Wales coalfield to prevent further disasters. Work began on the tree planting and lake formation that removed industrial waste, repaired damaged and transformed the area from an industrial zone into a country park in the 1980s.

In 1990, the site was used as the location for the National Eisteddfod. Although the event was hosted by the close-by Rhymney Valley, the location of the maes was within the park, a part of Blaenau Gwent. The Gorsedd stones used as part of the festival can still be visited in the park.

== Wildlife ==
At the centre of Parc Bryn Bach is a 26 acres (11 ha) lake populated by carp, pike, roach and rudd as well as some other small species of fish.

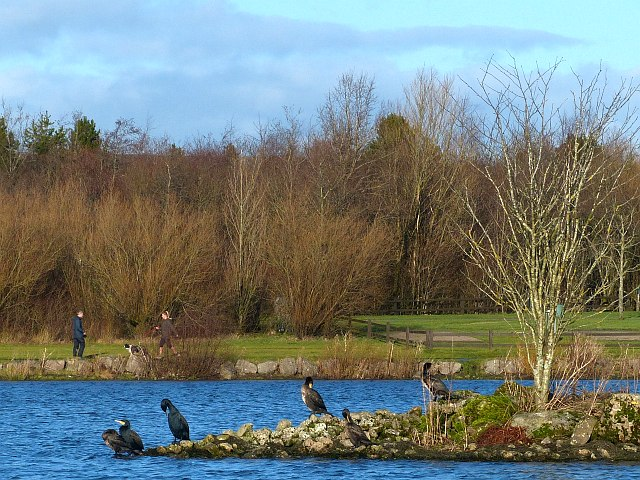
Cormorants resting on an island in the centre of the lake

The park is designated as a local nature reserve (LNR) and contains woodland, grassland, lake, pond and ditch, heathland and hedgerow habitats. These habitats home some of the most vulnerable UK species that include five bird species of conservation concern included on the UK Biodiversity Action Plan (BAP) including the skylark and lapwing, endangered invertebrate species, such as the Scarce blue-tailed damselfly and brown hawker dragonfly and rare plant species like the narrow leaved bittercress and ivy leaved bellflower, which are listed as threatened on the IUCN Red List.

The park is also home to various species of; mammals such as bats, foxes and hedgehogs; amphibians like the common frog and palmate newt; migratory and non-migratory waterbirds such as the great crested grebe, canada goose, Mute Swan, coot, mallard and tufted ducks; as well as insects like the orange tipped butterfly, damselflies, dragonflies, bumblebees and honeybees. The park is also home to some nesting red kites, barn owls and short-eared owl.

== Facilities ==
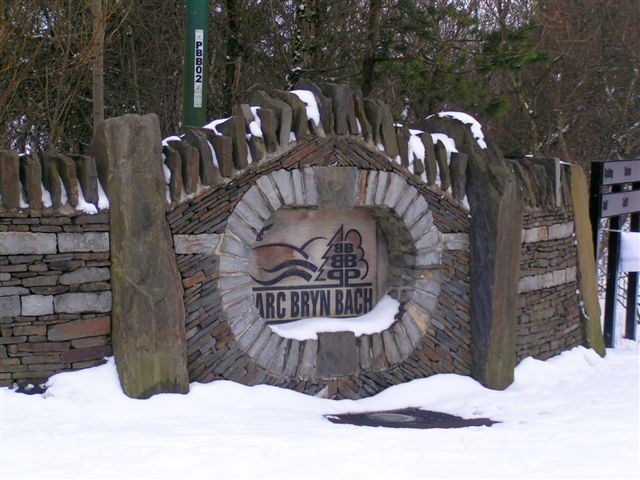
The park's entrance sign during winter covered with snow

Parc Bryn Bach has been awarded the Green Flag Award every year between 2016 - 2024 and was shortlisted for the UK's Favourite Park in 2022.

The park has a 26 acres (11 ha) lake that is used for fishing and watersports such as kayaking, Paddleboarding and open-water swimming. The perimeter of the lake is a designated Parkrun and is the highest above sea-level in the UK. The perimeter of the park is also used by the Running Club who organise an annual cross-country running competition.

There is an onsite visitors centre which has a cafe open daily as well as a AALA approved education and activities centre.

In 2023, the park opened a "workhub" which is a free workspace for those with remote working possibilities.

The park also hosts a play park, a sensory garden, driving range, miniature golf, a climbing wall, a mountain bike trail, a nature trail, an archery range, caravan park, bunk house and campsite.

Parc Bryn Bach is also home to Met Office surface weather station.
