= Cholera Monument Grounds and Clay Wood =

Memorial in Sheffield, England

Coordinates: 53.37597°N 1.45920°W

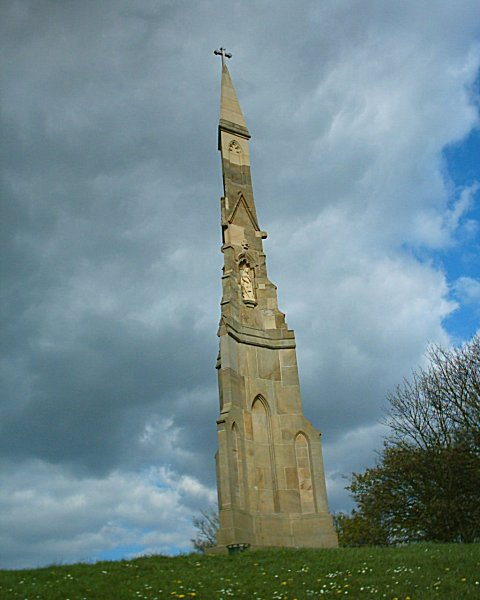
The Cholera Monument

The Cholera Monument is a memorial in Sheffield, England, to the victims of a cholera epidemic of 1832. In a 2022 lecture, Richard C. Keller, Professor of Medical History and Bioethics in the University of Wisconsin–Madison, identified the Monument, the Cefn Golau Cholera Cemetery, Tredegar, Blaenau Gwent and Duffy's Cut in Philadelphia, Pennsylvania as examples of 'a handful of memorial plaques [sic] designating mass burial sites of cholera victims from the nineteenth century'. Of the 402 disease victims, 339 were buried in grounds between Park Hill and Norfolk Park adjoining Clay Wood. Money from the treasurers of the Board of Health was set aside for a monument for the site.

The monument was designed by M. E. Hadfield, sculpted by Earp and Hobbs and completed in 1835. It is a neo-Gothic pinnacle and has a plaque which names one victim, 'John Blake', who held the office of Master Cutler. Also it notes that the foundation stone was laid by the poet James Montgomery.

The monument is situated in gardens laid out around the monument in the 1850s and next to Clay Wood, an ancient woodland. These were given to the city by the Duke of Norfolk in 1930. A shaded path laid between 1971 and 1995 traverses the woods from Fitzwalter Road to the monument gardens. The monument was struck by lightning in 1990 and the top was removed for safety. Rebuilding began in 2005 thanks to a grant, and was completed in 2006. Restorer Jim Hurley and his team received the 2006 Marsh Award for Excellence in Public Sculpture for their work.

A clay cobbled mound art installation was erected in 2004, representing the individuals who died.

September 2014 saw the official opening of a 'green link', providing paths and cycle ways between Norfolk Heritage Park and the city centre. The route included:

- The Cholera Monument Grounds
- Opening up the north-western corner of the grounds which overlook the city centre, and
- Providing a direct link from the monument to Shrewsbury Road.

The monument is grade II listed, while the grounds are a conservation area which has received a Green Flag Award.
