= Bryan D. White =

British leader of Loyal Order of Moose

Bryan David White (born 9 February 1936 in Tredegar, Monmouthshire Wales; died 12 May 2017 in Winscombe, Somerset, England) was general secretary (1978–1984) and chief executive officer of the Loyal Order of Moose in Britain (1984–2001).

== Early Years & Family Tradition ==
White was the younger son of George White and he joined the Loyal Order of Moose in Britain in 1966, as the third generation of his family to do so.

== Advancement ==
He rose rapidly through its ranks and became the Welsh Area Secretary, the assistant general secretary, and in January 1978, became the order's third general secretary. He became the first chief executive officer in 1984 and he retired in 2001.

Bryan died at 8:30 on Friday 12 May 2017 following a long illness aged 81.

== Honours ==
He has received many honours for his leadership from both America and Britain.

Before joining the British Moose he was active in civic and trade union politics, and he served a term as the mayor of Tredegar.
