= Tredegar Town Hall =

Municipal Building in Tredegar, Wales

- Neuadd y Dref Tredegar (Welsh)
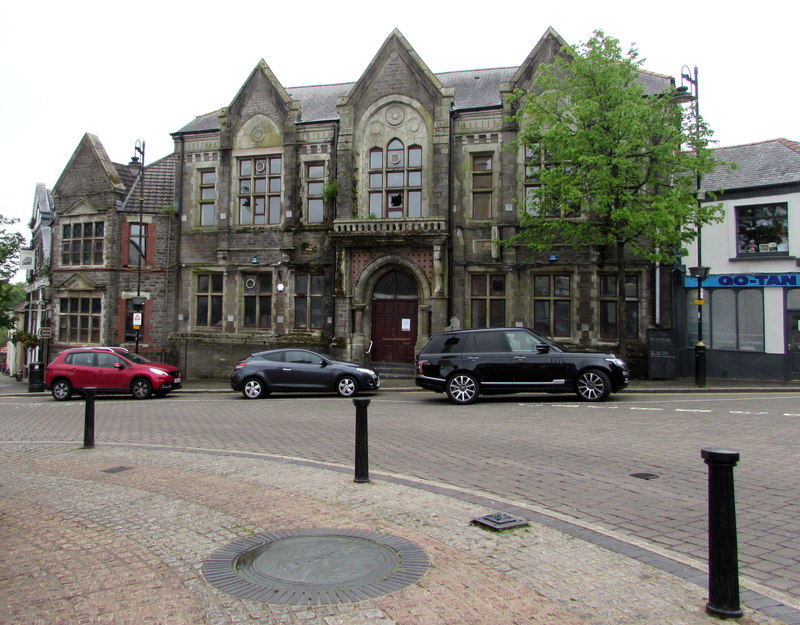
- Tredegar Town Hall

- Shown in Blaenau Gwent
- 51.7712°N 3.2455°W
- Location: The Circle, Tredegar

History
- Built: 1892

Site notes
- Architectural style: Gothic Revival style

Listed Building – Grade II
- Official name: N. C. B. Club
- Designated: 14 October 1999
- Reference no.: 22489

Tredegar Town Hall (Welsh: Neuadd y Dref Tredegar) is a municipal structure in The Circle, Tredegar, Wales. The town hall, which was the headquarters of Tredegar Urban District Council, is a Grade II listed building.

== History ==
The first building on the site formed part of an early 19th century initiative by the industrialist, Samuel Homfray, to create a central market place for the town: the first town hall was one of the buildings erected at that time and was completed in 1818. It incorporated a school from 1838. After the first town hall became dilapidated in the late 19th century, civic leaders decided to demolish it and build a new structure on the same site: the new building was designed in the Gothic Revival style, built in ashlar stone and was officially opened on 24 December 1892.

The design involved a symmetrical main frontage with seven bays facing onto The Circle; the central bay, which slightly projected forward, featured an arched doorway with colonettes supporting a stone surround and brackets supporting a cornice and a balcony. There were four-light windows in the other bays on the ground floor. On the first floor, there were large nine-light mullioned windows with gables above in the central bay and in the centre of each of the two side sections. The gables contained roundels in the tympanae. As well as rooms for the civic leaders, the building also incorporated facilities for the county court.

After significant population growth, largely associated with coal mining, the area became an urban district with the town hall as its headquarters in 1894. The town hall was primarily used as a venue for civic events after the urban district council acquired Bedwellty House and converted it into offices for council officers and their departments in 1901. After being elected as the Labour Member of Parliament for Ebbw Vale for the first time at the 1929 general election, the politician and future Deputy Leader of the party, Aneurin Bevan, delivered a speech from the balcony of the town hall on 31 May 1929.

Following the formation of the enlarged Blaenau Gwent District Council in 1974, there was limited demand for civic events in the town and the building was redeveloped and re-opened as the National Coal Board Club (usually referred to as the "N. C . B. Club"). After the owners of the building went into liquidation, the club closed in 2010, and the building has remained vacant and deteriorating since then.
