= Mynydd y Lan =

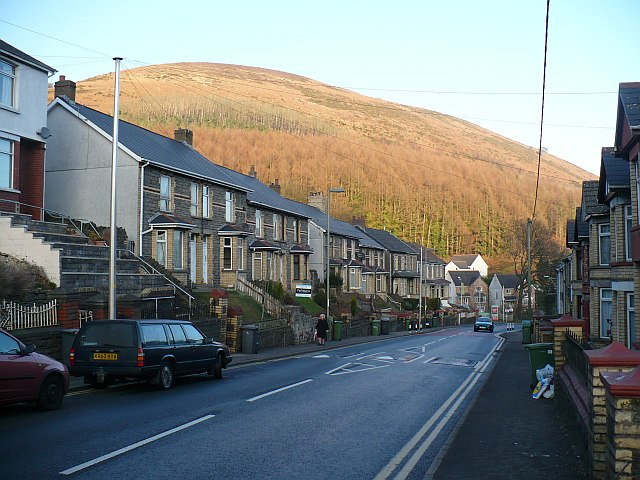
- Mynydd y Lan from Wattsville

Highest point
- Elevation: 381 m (1,250 ft)
- Prominence: 215 m (705 ft)
- Listing: Marilyn
- Coordinates: 51.6257°N 3.1455°W

Naming
- English translation: hill of the church/enclosure
- Language of name: Welsh

Geography
- Location: Caerphilly, Wales
- OS grid: ST 208923
- Topo map: OS Landranger 171 / Explorer 152, 166

Mynydd y Lan is a 381-metre-high flat-topped hill in Caerphilly county borough in South Wales. It falls largely within the community of Ynysddu but its northern and eastern margins are within Crosskeys community. Its largely wooded southern and eastern flanks rise steeply from the Sirhowy and Ebbw valleys respectively. A wireless transmission station is situated at the northern end of the summit plateau. The name "Mynydd y Lan" literally means "mountain of the church", referring to the parish church of St Tudor, which stands on the plateau. The church site has been in use since the 5th century, with an early British structure replaced by a Norman church in the 11th century.

Three Radio Towers

== Geology ==
The hill is situated towards the southeastern margin of the South Wales Coalfield. The summit plateau and upper slopes of the hill are formed from sandstones of the Pennant Sandstone Formation assigned to the Warwickshire Group of the late Carboniferous Period.

== Access ==
The larger part of the hill including its flanking woodlands is mapped as open access under the Countryside and Rights of Way Act 2000 and thereby open to access on foot by the public. In addition a handful of public footpaths run through the woodlands providing additional access. One is followed by the Ebbw Valley Walk, another by the Raven Walk.
