= Mynydd Bedwellte =

Coordinates: 51.747°N 3.239°W

Mynydd Bedwellte is the name given to the broad ridge of high ground between the Rhymney Valley (Welsh: Cwm Rhymni) and the Sirhowy Valley in the Valleys region of South Wales. It straddles the boundary of the unitary areas of Caerphilly and Blaenau Gwent.

The broad-topped ridge runs northwest to southeast and achieves a summit height of 486 metres (1,594 ft) above sea-level, at a point crowned by a trig point at OS grid ref SO 145060.

== Geology ==
The entire hill is composed of sandstones and mudstones dating from the Carboniferous Period. There are also numerous coal seams within the sequence, most of which have been worked. The upper part of the hill including the summit plateau is formed from the Pennant Sandstone, a rock assigned to the Carboniferous Upper Coal Measures. The flanks of the hill owe their steepness in part to the action of glacial ice during the succession of ice ages.

== Access ==
A minor public road runs along the western edge of the plateau. All of the land to its east has been mapped as open country under the CRoW Act thus giving a right of access to walkers. There are a few public footpaths and other public rights of way across parts of the hill.
