= Glyn Parry =

Glyn Parry may refer to:

- Glyn Parry (historian) (born 1953), Welsh historian at Victoria University Wellington, New Zealand
- Glyn Parry (author) (born c. 1959), Australian writer of children's literature, young-adult fiction, and speculative fiction
