= Bedwellty House =

Coordinates: 51°46′07″N 3°14′34″W

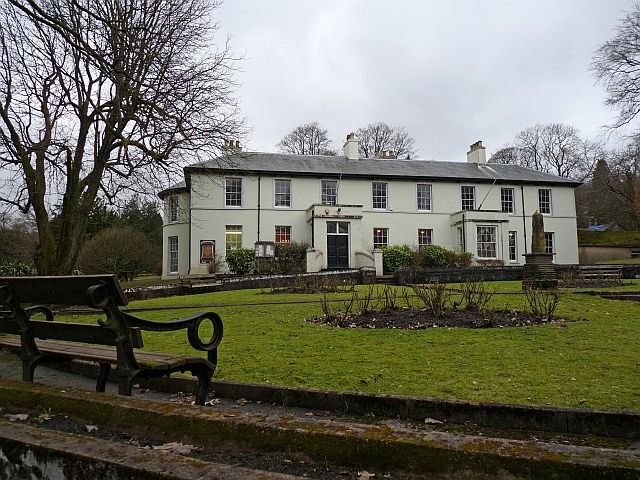
Bedwellty House

Bedwellty House is a Grade II-listed house and gardens in Tredegar, in the Sirhowy Valley in south-east Wales. It was built in the early 19th century on the site of an earlier building and subsequently enlarged into its present form by mid-century. The owners donated the house and its grounds to the public at the beginning of the 20th century. They were restored at the beginning of the 21st century. The grounds are included on the Cadw/ICOMOS Register of Parks and Gardens of Special Historic Interest in Wales, the only estate so listed in Blaenau Gwent.

== History ==
Plas Bedwellty was a small house owned by the Morgans of Tredegar House and was purchased by the ironmaster Samuel Homfray in 1800. He rebuilt it in 1825 and his son enlarged the house with the two rear wings by 1842. The Morgans reacquired the building by mid-century and reserved for the use of the manager of the Tredegar Iron and Coal Company. The Morgan family gave the house and its grounds to the local community in 1901 and it was remodelled as offices for the Urban District Council.

Bedwellty House and its grounds were restored 2006–11 by the Heritage Lottery Fund and other agencies. The house is a Grade II listed building.

The surrounding 26-acre (110,000 m^{2}) Victorian garden and park, designed originally as a Dutch garden around which one could walk or ride without being confronted by gate, fence or outside features; contains the Long Shelter, a Grade II-listed structure built for the Chartist movement. Visitors today can also see the Edwardian bandstand, gazebo, duck ponds, and a world-famous lump of coal – a single 15-ton block hewn by South Wales coal miners for the Great Exhibition in 1851. In 2022 Cadw listed the park at Grade II on its Cadw/ICOMOS Register of Parks and Gardens of Special Historic Interest in Wales.

== See also ==
- List of gardens in Wales
