= Wyllie, Caerphilly =

Village in Caerphilly, Wales

Coordinates: 51°38′19″N 3°11′25″W

Wyllie is a small village south of Blackwood in Ynysddu community, county borough of Caerphilly, within the historic boundaries of Monmouthshire, Wales.

== History & Amenities ==
Most of the houses were built between 1926 and 1930 by the Tredegar Iron and Coal Company.

Included in the village was a large church, post office and miners' institute which was converted into a pub in the 1990s. The post office has recently closed and the church has been replaced by a small block of apartments known as Marion Jones Court.

The village has recently expanded with the building of new houses on the old coal tip from Wyllie Colliery at the south end of the village. There are now 27 modern houses covering the colliery.

Wyllie Halt railway station was located here between 1932 and 1960.
