= Wyllie Halt railway station =

Disused railway station in Wyllie, Caerphilly

Wyllie Halt

General information
- Location: Wyllie, Monmouthshire; Wales
- Coordinates: 51.6356°N 3.1927°W
- Grid reference: ST175936
- Platforms: 2

Other information
- Status: Disused

History
- Original company: London, Midland and Scottish Railway

Key dates
- 19 December 1932: Opened
- 13 June 1960: Closed
Location

Wyllie Halt railway station served the village of Wyllie, in the historic county of Monmouthshire, Wales, from 1932 to 1960 on the Sirhowy Railway.

== History ==
The station was opened on 19 December 1932 by the London, Midland and Scottish Railway. It closed on 13 June 1960.

Preceding station	Disused railways	Following station
Pontllanfraith High Level; Line and station closed	London, Midland and Scottish Railway; Sirhowy Railway	Ynysddu; Line and station closed
