= George Cording =

Welsh cricketer

Personal information
- Full name: George Ernest Cording
- Born: 1 January 1878; Tredegar, Monmouthshire, Wales
- Died: 2 February 1946 (aged 68); Llanrumney, Glamorgan, Wales
- Batting: Right-handed
- Role: Wicket-keeper

Domestic team information
- Years: Team
- 1900–1923: Glamorgan

Career statistics
| Competition | First-class |
|---|---|
| Matches | 19 |
| Runs scored | 498 |
| Batting average | 16.60 |
| 100s/50s | 1/1 |
| Top score | 101 |
| Balls bowled | – |
| Wickets | – |
| Bowling average | – |
| 5 wickets in innings | – |
| 10 wickets in match | – |
| Best bowling | – |
| Catches/stumpings | 16/2 |
- Source: Cricinfo, 7 May 2012

George Ernest Cording (1 January 1878 – 2 February 1946) was a Welsh cricketer. Cording was a right-handed batsman who fielded as a wicket-keeper. He was born at Tredegar, Monmouthshire.

Cording made his debut in county cricket for Glamorgan against Berkshire in the 1900 Minor Counties Championship. His appearances for Glamorgan were limited in his capacity as a full-time school teacher. Before World War I, his teaching commitments limited his appearances in the Minor Counties Championship to just seventeen. Glamorgan were afforded first-class status for the 1921 season, with Cording, aged 43 at this time, keeping-wicket in Glamorgan's inaugural County Championship match against Sussex at Cardiff Arms Park. Cording assisted Glamorgan for two further seasons, making eighteen further first-class appearances, the last of which came against Yorkshire at Bramall Lane, Sheffield. In his nineteen first-class appearances, he scored a total of 498 runs at an average of 16.60, with a high score of 101. This score, which was his only first-class century, came against Worcestershire at St Helens, Swansea, in 1921.

After retiring from cricket, Cording continued to promote cricket in South Wales, helping raise war funds with friendly matches during World War II. Cording served during the war with the National Fire Service. He died at Llanrumney, Glamorgan, on 2 February 1946.
