= Cefn Golau Cholera Cemetery =

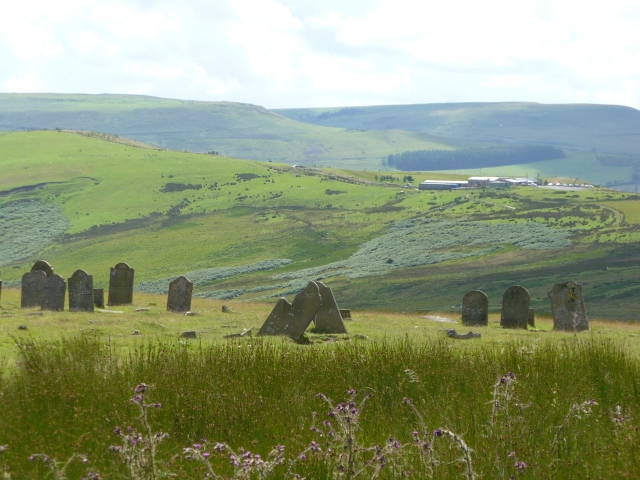
- The cemetery today

- Location in Wales
- 51.76°N 3.26°W
- Location: Wales
- OS grid reference: SO1308

Cefn Golau Cholera Cemetery is situated on a narrow mountain ridge in the county borough of Blaenau Gwent, between Rhymney and Tredegar in South East Wales. The Welsh name Cefn Golau means 'hill of light'.

Cefn Golau is also the name of four nearby places. Two of them are cemeteries: a modern one, which is maintained by the local authority – Blaenau Gwent County Borough Council – and its disused predecessor, the original cemetery of the town. The other two places are an adjacent leat and, below it, a suburb of the town.

The graves in the cholera cemetery date from the three outbreaks of Asiatic cholera which occurred in 1832–1833, 1849–1850, and 1866. The cemetery is a Scheduled Ancient Monument and is protected by law. According to one estimate, the total number of people buried "may number between 200 and 600".

The cemetery is the only surviving cholera cemetery in South Wales and is one of the few such cemeteries that remain in Britain. In a 2022 lecture, Richard C. Keller, Professor of Medical History and Bioethics at the University of Wisconsin–Madison, identified this cemetery, along with Duffy's Cut in Philadelphia, Pennsylvania, and the Cholera Monument in Sheffield, South Yorkshire, as examples of "a handful of memorial plaques [sic] designating mass burial sites of cholera victims from the nineteenth century".

== The epidemiology of cholera ==
Cholera is a water-borne disease. However, in the first half of the nineteenth century, there were two alternative and competing theories about the cause of it, contagionism and miasmatism. American author Steven Johnson explained the theories as follows: "Either cholera was some kind of agent that passed from person to person, like the flu, or it somehow lingered in the 'miasma' of unsanitary spaces." Whichever theory about the cause of cholera prevailed in Tredegar at the start of the first outbreak in the town in 1832, insufficient attention was paid to the provision of adequate sanitation for its inhabitants. For example, local historian Oliver Jones (1969) observed that, in the 1820s:

"Water for domestic purposes had to be carried from the nearest stream or from one of the spouts around the district. These spouts tapped a head of water which collected behind a bank of earth or a wall – hence Spout Row, the name given to the first houses in the Park Hill area where one of these old spouts is still in existence. … In matters of sanitation the town was no worse – or better – than the others along the Iron Belt. Very few privies existed, whole rows being without one. Buckets, kept in a “cwtch” outside the back door, had to serve, the contents of which were disposed of on the nearest garbage heap or buried in gardens used over and over again for the same purpose. Heavy rains invariably caused floodings in certain areas but little could be done and the water was left to seep away in the gutters it cut for itself."

Yet, in contrast, scholar-priest E. T. Davies observed: "although in the area generally, thousands of families lived in very bad conditions, there was general agreement that the interior of their houses were kept clean in spite of adverse conditions."

== The three epidemics in Tredegar ==
Tredegar experienced three cholera epidemics during the nineteenth century: 1832–1833, 1849–1850, and 1866. All were local outbreaks of three international pandemics – 1826–1837, 1846–1860, and 1863–1875 – which entered Britain. The first epidemic arrived in October 1831 in Sunderland, brought by passengers on a ship that had come from the Baltic. Hempel (2007) documented that the second epidemic entered in September 1848 in South London, brought by a merchant seaman who had arrived from Hamburg. The third epidemic entered in June 1866 in East London and was traced to the water supplied by the East London Waterworks Company.

=== 1832-33 ===
The 1832–1833 cholera epidemic was the first to occur in Tredegar. The disease arrived in Newport in June 1832 and in the following month in Swansea from the Mary Ann, a ship that had previously sailed from Calcutta, where an outbreak of 'cholera morbus' had occurred.

Local historian W.J. Probert documented that the first person who died in the town was Wm. Thomas, a wheelwright and a native of Swansea, who died on the 20th of October 1832. Thirty-five local residents, nineteen males and seventeen females, died in quick succession from the 10th of November to the 19th of January of the following year. However, this was not the final toll. Probert also documented that other victims were "taken away by night to be buried by their friends". Jones (1969) observed that the outbreak:

"began in the autumn and continued well into the spring of the next year. Victim after victim fell to the disease, very few families escaping without bereavement. Men and women, well at one moment, were ill the next and dead within a few hours. The authorities, panic stricken like the people, closed the chapel graveyards and opened a special cholera cemetery on Cefn Golau in an effort to bury the bodies as far away as possible. ... Little was done to deal with the situation beyond the giving of advice, the free distribution of disinfectants and the closing of the graveyards."

=== 1849-50 ===
The 1849–1850 epidemic was the second to occur and was much more serious than its predecessor. The disease had already struck neighbouring Rhymney in July 1849 and Nantyglo in August 1849 before it reached the town. Two counts of deaths were cited. According to the renowned physician Charles Creighton (1894), 157 deaths occurred during May 1849, while according to Jones (1958), 203 deaths occurred.

As the number of victims increased, scarcely a street in the town remained unaffected. The doctors searched for remedies without success; people left their homes and fled into the countryside, while others stayed indoors. Many sought help from their religion, and the chapels were packed, but the death toll still mounted. People could appear to be fit in the morning and be dead by evening. The disease caused so much fear that few people were willing to help bury the victims. With the arrival of colder and wetter weather in the autumn, the number of new infections gradually dwindled.

=== 1866 ===
In contrast to the previous two epidemics, the 1866 epidemic originated in the Middle East. A doubtful case of the disease occurred in late May in Swansea, which prompted The Merthyr Telegraph to ask, "Is the Cholera Coming?" Its question was answered later in the summer when, as Jones (1958) documented, "the disease again made havoc in the industrial districts of South Wales." Two counts of deaths were cited. In 1866, the Bedwellty Registrar District reported that the number of deaths from the disease was 122. In 1868, the Registrar‑General of Births, Deaths, and Marriages in England reported that the number of deaths from the disease was 101. He commented that "Sirhowy [is] supplied with water from wells and surface water; the surface water may be liable to contamination. Tredegar is supplied with water from the Tredegar Waterworks."

== The headstones ==
The burial ground on its remote, windswept site was abandoned a long time ago. However, a few gravestones still stand in the sheep‑nibbled turf. Some headstones in the cemetery date from 1832. They are small, with boldly cut scripts and elegant floral designs. In contrast, the headstones from the 1849 outbreak are much larger and more numerous, with most of the deaths dating from August and September, when the epidemic was at its peak. There is one stone from the 1866 outbreak.

Jones (1969) documented that the headstones "describe the victims of the 1832 and 1848 epidemics as 'natives of the Tredegar Iron Works' and as late as the 1860s letters were still being addressed, for example, to 'Mr. John Lewis, East Lane, Tredegar Iron Works.'" An example is the headstone that was erected for William Thomas (see above), the first stone to be erected in the cemetery, which reads:

"To the memory of William Thomas, Wheelwright, Late of Swansea, who departed this life at Tredegar Iron Works October 21st, 1832 aged 32 years. He was the first who died of the Cholera and was interred in this burial ground. This stone was placed at the expense of his friends at Tredegar Iron Works."

One headstone is a memorial to Thomas James, who died on 18 August 1849, aged 24 years. The inscription on it reads:

"One night and day I bore great pain,
To try for cure was all in vain,
But God knew what to me was best,
Did ease my pain and give me rest."

Some of the inscriptions on the gravestones are in English, others in Welsh and some are in a mixture of the two languages.

== The aftermath ==
Jones (1988) observed that the Bedwellty Board of Guardians was appointed in 1849 "with responsibility for administering medical relief" and that the "Tredegar Company drew the attention of the Guardians to the filthy state of the town and suggested that an Inspector of Nuisances [a forerunner of an Environmental health officer] be appointed." In 1866, an area health board was established, partly because of a government order and because another outbreak of cholera was feared. Also, in an early undertaking of public health, the Bedwellty Guardians co‑opted three doctors to undertake house‑to‑house inspections, and the local police superintendent was appointed as the part‑time Inspector of Nuisances, with the power to prosecute householders who failed to dispose of their refuse suitably.

In 1874, these public health undertakings were followed by the creation of the Health and Education Fund by the Tredegar Iron and Coal Company, one of the several local health schemes some of which combined to form the Tredegar Medical Aid Society. However, as Ray Earwicker (1980) observed:

"The range of [miners' medical services] provided in South Wales was unrivalled and the quality is evidenced in the testimony of Dr. Llewellyn-Williams, medical inspector of the Welsh Insurance Commissioners. However this favourable review was not matched by any conspicuous improvement in the indices of morbity and mortality. Monmouth and Glamorgan were consistently well above average on every indicator of ill-health. Tredegar, like other parts of the area, was characterised by a high birth-rate – an average of 33 per 1,000 between 1911-15, high death-rate, 18.4, and high infant mortality rate of 141."
