= Ynysddu railway station =

Disused railway station in Ynysddu, Caerphilly

Ynysddu

General information
- Location: Ynysddu, Monmouthshire; Wales
- Coordinates: 51.6253°N 3.1889°W
- Grid reference: ST178925
- Platforms: 2

Other information
- Status: Disused

History
- Original company: Sirhowy Railway
- Pre-grouping: London and North Western Railway
- Post-grouping: London, Midland and Scottish Railway

Key dates
- August 1871: Opened
- 13 June 1960: Closed
Location

Ynysddu railway station served the village of Ynysddu, in the historical county of Monmouthshire, Wales, from 1871 to 1960 on the Sirhowy Railway.

== History ==
The station was opened in August 1871 by the Sirhowy Railway. It closed on 13 June 1960. The site is now part of a footpath.

Preceding station	Disused railways	Following station
Wyllie Halt; Line and station closed	Sirhowy Railway	Pont Lawrence Halt; Line and station closed
