= Sirhowy Valley Ridgeway Walk =

The Sirhowy Valley Ridgeway Walk (also referred to as the Sirhowy Valley Walk) is a 26 miles (42 km)-long recreational walk which runs from the southwestern outskirts of Newport north to the eastern edge of Tredegar in South Wales. The route is managed and maintained by Caerphilly County Borough Council, which publishes a free A3 leaflet describing it.
