= St Illtyd's Motte =

- Llanhilleth, Blaenau Gwent, Wales

Site information
- Type: Motte-and-bailey castle
- Owner: Private
- Condition: Ruins

Location
- Shown within Wales
- Coordinates: 51.71050°N 3.13426°W

Scheduled monument
- Official name: St Illtyd Castle Mound
- Designated: 14 May 1952; 74 years ago
- Reference no.: MM141

St Illtyd's Motte, also known as St Illtyd Castle Mound, is the remains of a motte-and-bailey castle in the village of Llanhilleth, Blaenau Gwent, Wales. It was probably destroyed by Llywelyn the Great in the early thirteenth century and not rebuilt. The remnants are a Scheduled Ancient Monument.

The surviving motte is a roughly circular steep-sided, flat-topped mound about 36 metres (118 ft) in diameter and 6.16 metres (20.2 ft) high. It is surrounded by a partially filled-in ditch that is 4–5 metres (13–16 ft) wide and 0.8 metres (2 ft 7 in) deep.
