= Open terrain =

Flat obstruction-free terrain

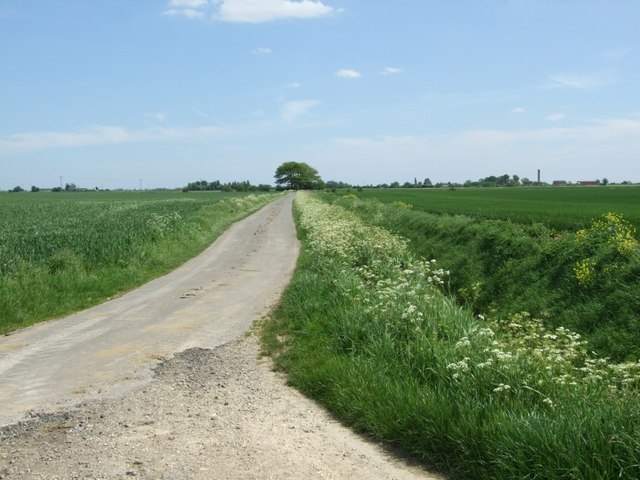
Farmland in the Fens.

Open terrain, open country or open ground is terrain which is mostly flat and free of obstructions such as trees and buildings. Examples include farmland, grassland and specially cleared areas such as an airport.

Such terrain is significant in military manoeuvre and tactics as the lack of obstacles makes movement easy and engagements are possible at long range. Such terrain is preferred to close terrain for offensive action as rapid movement makes decisive battles possible.

Wind loading tends to be high in open country as there are few obstacles providing a windbreak. This affects the design of tall structures such electricity pylons and windmills.

== See also ==
- Open Country
