= Wyllie Colliery =

Coal mine in Sirhowy Valley, South Wales

Coordinates: 51.639°N 3.190°W

Wyllie Colliery was located in the Sirhowy Valley, South Wales.

The coal mine was sunk by the Tredegar Iron and Coal Company and opened in 1926. The colliery was named after a director of the company, Alexander Wyllie. Wyllie village was built to house many of the miners working at the pit. There were two shafts, North and South, both 636 yd (582 m) deep.

The colliery remained open for only 42 years before closing in 1968.
