= The Merthyr Telegraph =

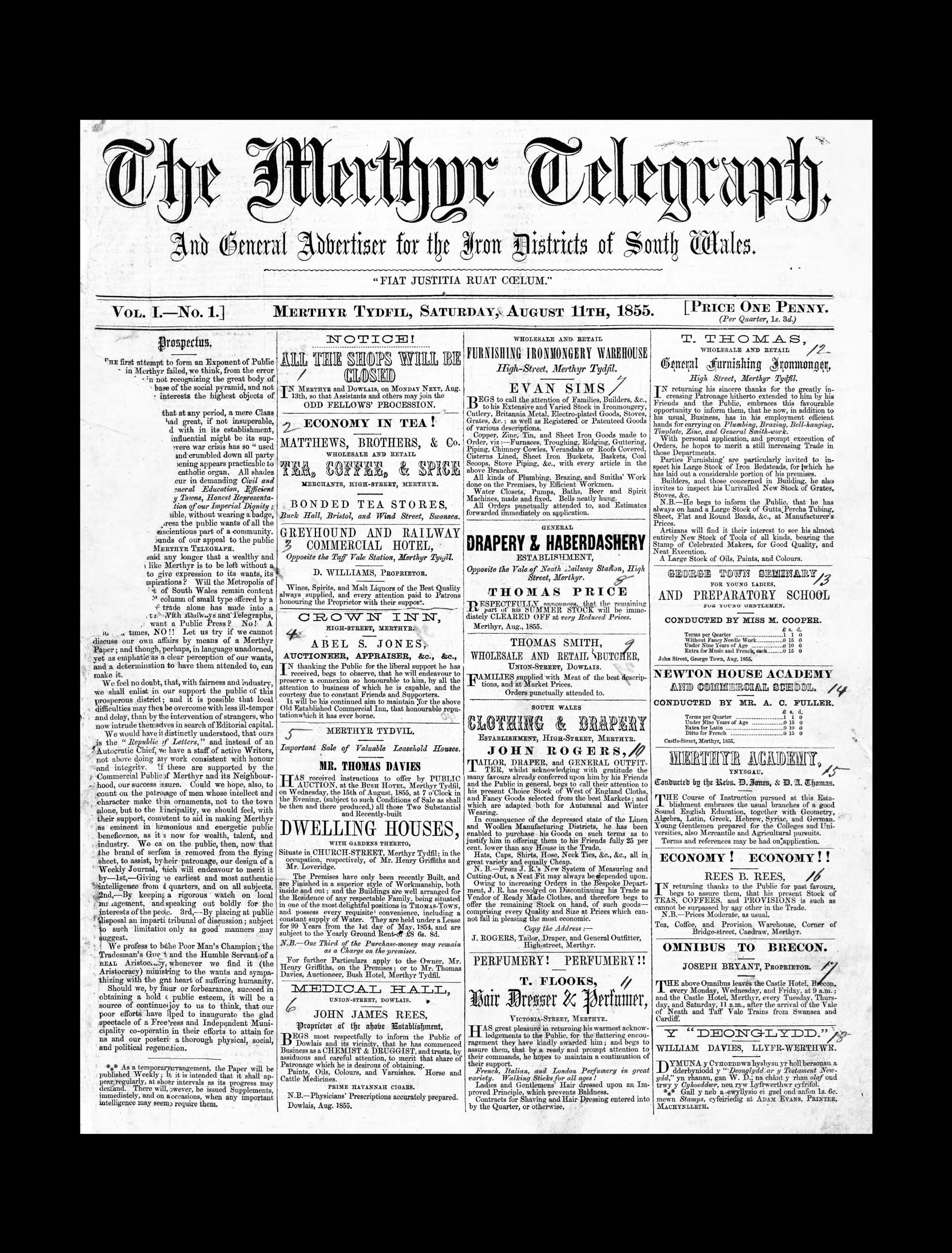
- Type: weekly newspaper
- Publisher: Peter Williams
- City: Merthyr Tydfil
- OCLC number: 751657447

The Merthyr Telegraph and General Advertiser for the Iron Districts of South Wales (established in 1855 by Peter Williams) was a weekly publication distributed in the iron-producing areas of South Wales. It contained mainly local news and information.

Welsh Newspapers Online has digitised 1,336 issues of the Merthyr Telegraph (1855–1881) from the newspaper holdings of the National Library of Wales.
