= Country park =

Area for recreation in a countryside environment

A country park is a natural area designated for people to visit and enjoy recreation in a countryside environment.

== United Kingdom ==
This symbol is used to designate a country park in the United Kingdom, for example on road signs.

=== History ===
In the United Kingdom, the term country park has a specific meaning. There are around 250 designated country parks in England and Wales attracting some 57 million visitors a year, and another 40 or so in Scotland. Most country parks were designated in the 1970s, under the Countryside Act 1968, with the support of the former Countryside Commission. In more recent times there has been no specific financial support for country parks directly and fewer have been designated.

Most parks are managed by local authorities, although other organisations and private individuals can also run them. The Countryside Act 1968 empowered the Countryside Commission to recognize country parks. Although the act established country parks and gave guidance on the core facilities and services they should provide it did not empower the designation of sites as country parks, as it was left to local authorities to decide whether to endorse a site calling itself a country park.

In England, country parks can be accredited by Natural England, and some also have Green Flag status.

=== Purpose ===
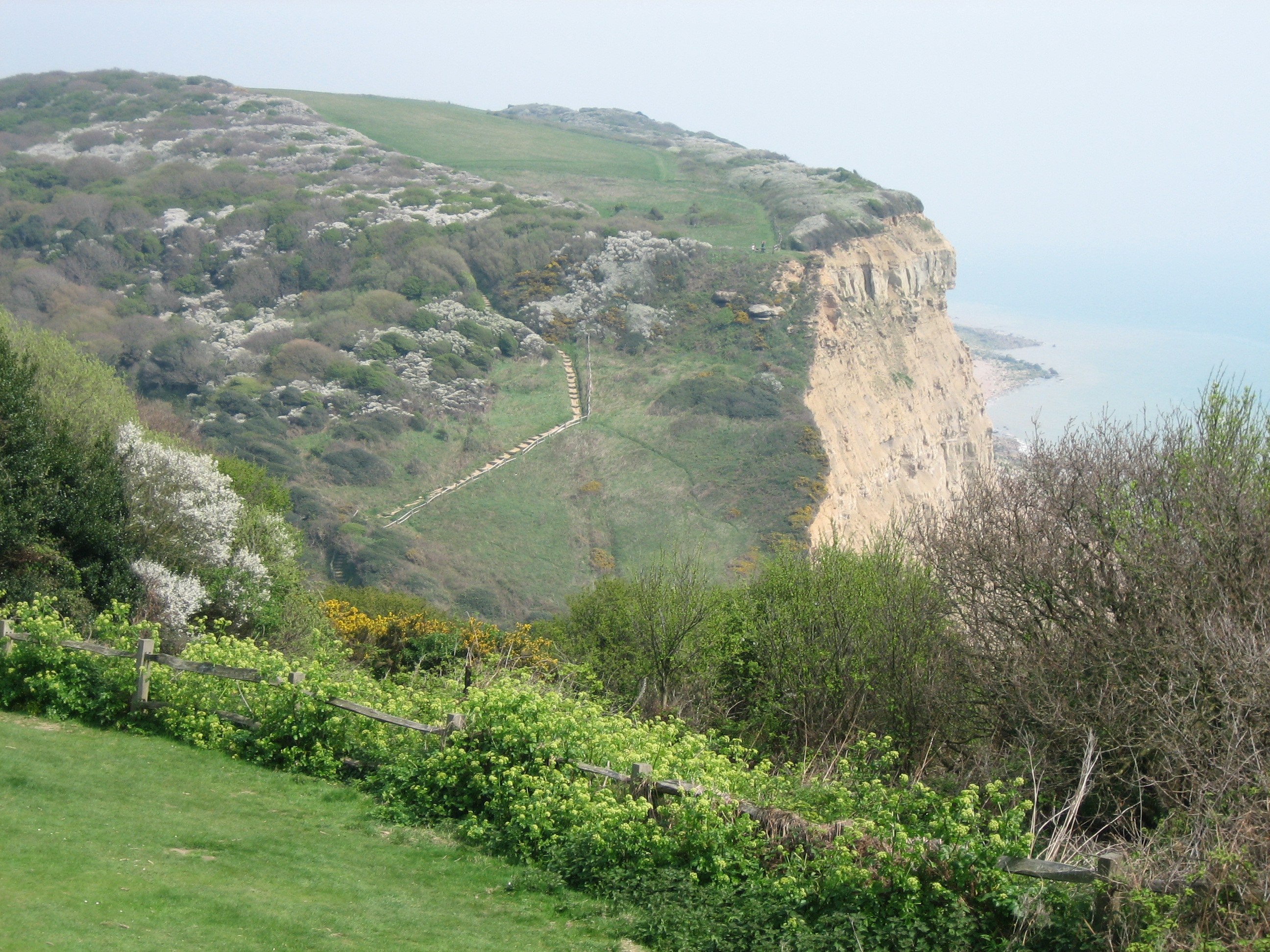
Hastings Country Park in East Sussex

The purpose of a country park is to provide a place that has a natural, rural atmosphere for visitors who do not necessarily want to go out into the wider countryside. Visitors can enjoy a public open space with an informal atmosphere, as opposed to a formal park as might be found in an urban area. For this reason country parks are usually found close to or on the edge of built-up areas, and rarely in the wider countryside.

=== Amenities ===
A country park usually has some more formal facilities, such as a car park, toilets, maybe a cafe or kiosk, paths and trails, and some information for visitors. Some have much more, with museums, visitor centres, educational facilities, historic buildings, farms, boating, fishing, and other attractions.

Many larger country parks organise entertainment for visitors, and are venues for firework displays, shows and fairs and other large, outdoor events.

There is not necessarily any public right of access to country parks, and visitors are usually subject to byelaws when they enter the park. Some charge for car parking, some are free.

These parks vary tremendously from one to another, and really have only their purpose in common: to provide easy access to the countryside for those living in the towns and suburbs. They do not necessarily have any great nature conservation interest, although often this is the case.

== Hong Kong ==
In Hong Kong a large part of the territory's countryside is officially designated as country parks. Most of these are reservoir watersheds, serving the dual purpose of providing recreational facilities and contributing to Hong Kong's water supply.

== See also ==
- National park
- Open Country
- Open country
