= Moose International in Great Britain =

The Moose International in Great Britain Association (formerly known as The Grand Lodge of the Loyal Order of Moose in Great Britain) is a fraternal service organisation. It was run by a "Grand Council" from 1926 to 2013, and since then by a "National Management Committee". The current National President is Brian Gould.

The first Director-General, James J. Davis, founded the Grand Lodge at his birthplace of Tredegar in Wales. The aims of the organisation are the same as the Loyal Order of Moose in the United States, which are to help the orphaned and the widowed. The organisation runs fundraising programmes for various worthy causes. The British Headquarters of Moose International are in Burnham-on-Sea, Somerset. There are twenty-two chartered lodges active throughout England and Wales.
