= Glyn Parry (historian) =

British historian

Glyndwr John Robert Parry (GJR Parry) FRHistS was born in Tredegar, Monmouthshire on 31 October 1953. He matriculated at St John's College Cambridge in September 1972 and graduated BA from the University of Cambridge in June 1975, where he was also awarded a PhD in History in 1982. In 1987 he published A Protestant Vision: William Harrison and the Reformation of Elizabethan England with Cambridge University Press. As of 2010, he was a senior lecturer in history at Victoria University Wellington, New Zealand.
