= Tredegar Iron Works =

- U.S. National Register of Historic Places
- U.S. National Historic Landmark District
- Virginia Landmarks Register
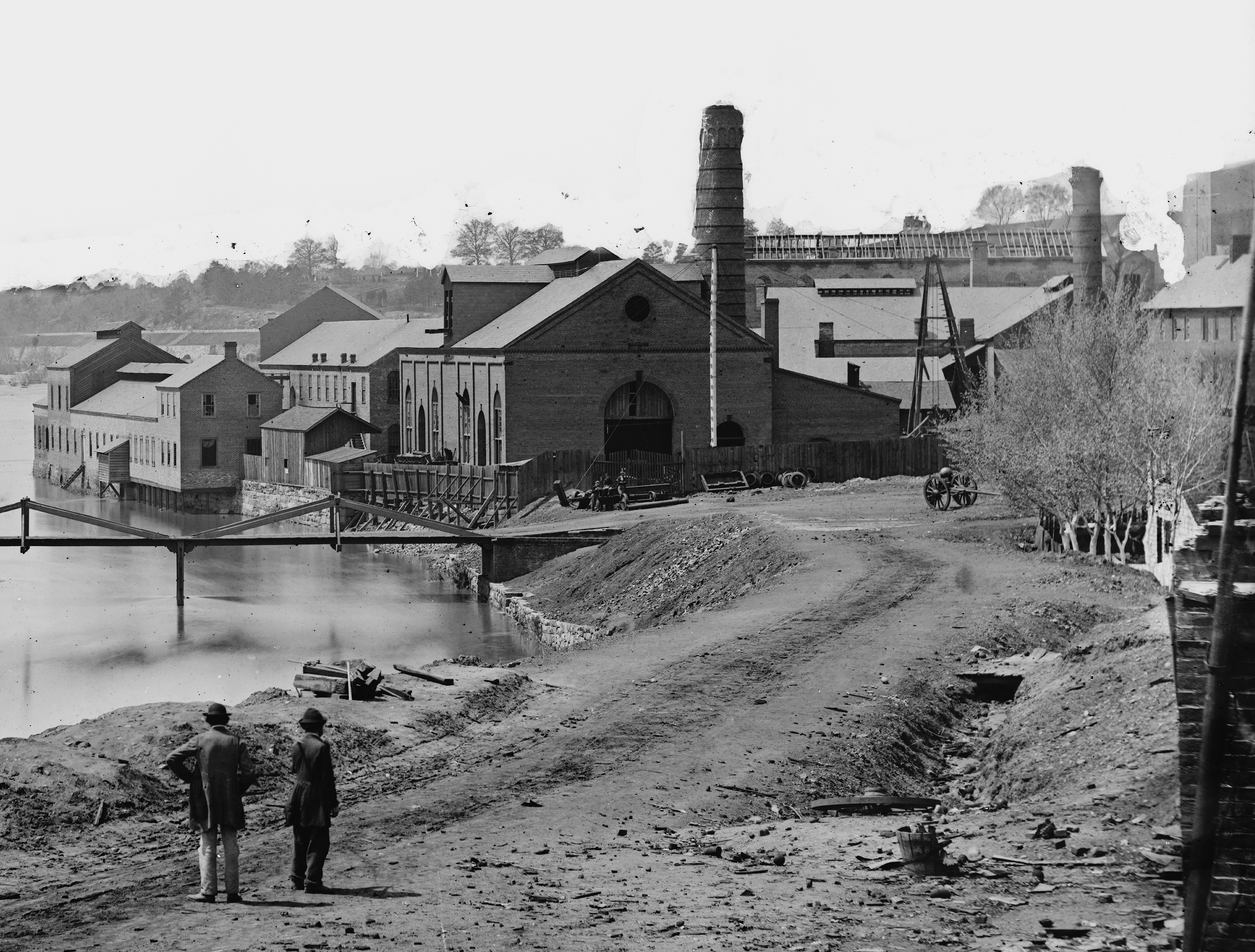
- Tredegar Iron Works, Richmond, Virginia, U.S., photograph by Alexander Gardner

- Location within Virginia Location within the United States
- Location: Richmond, Virginia
- Coordinates: 37°32′8″N 77°26′43″W
- Built: 1841
- Architect: Reev Davis
- NRHP reference No.: 71001048
- VLR No.: 127-0186

Significant dates
- Added to NRHP: July 2, 1971
- Designated NHLD: December 22, 1977
- Designated VLR: January 5, 1971

The Tredegar Iron Works in Richmond, Virginia, was the biggest ironworks in the Confederacy during the American Civil War, and a significant factor in the decision to make Richmond the Confederate capital.

Tredegar supplied about half the artillery used by the Confederate States Army, as well as the iron plating for CSS Virginia, the first Confederate ironclad warship, which fought in the historic Battle of Hampton Roads in March 1862. The works avoided destruction by troops during the evacuation of the city, and continued production through the mid-20th century. Now classified as a National Historic Landmark District, the site serves as the main building of the American Civil War Museum.

The name Tredegar derives from the Welsh industrial town that supplied much of the company's early workforce.

== History ==
=== Founding (1836–1841) ===
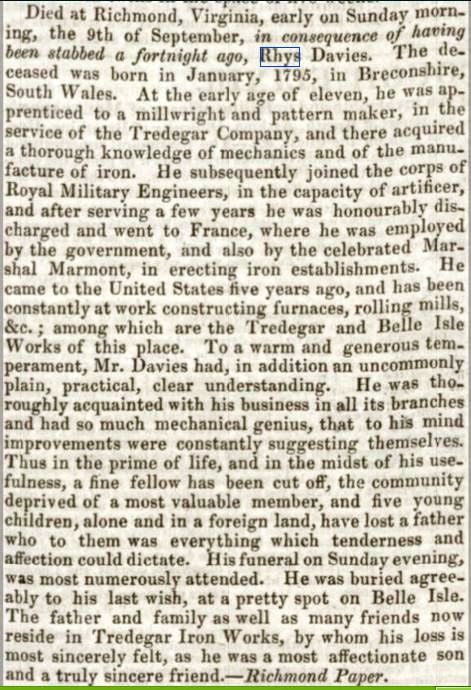
Death of Rhys Davies from stab wound 1838

In 1836, a group of Richmond businessmen and industrialists led by Francis B. Deane Jr. set about to capitalize on the growing railroad boom in the United States. The group hired Rhys Davies, then a young engineer, to construct a new facility, brought a number of his fellow iron workers from Tredegar, Wales, to construct the furnaces and rolling mills. The foundry was named in honor of the town of Tredegar, where iron works of the same name were constructed in the early 19th century. The new works opened in 1837, yet the Panic of 1837 and accompanying downturn resulted in hardship for the new company. Davies died in Richmond in September 1838 from stab wounds sustained in a fight with a workman and was buried on Belle Isle in the James River.

=== Management under Joseph Reid Anderson (1841 – Civil War) ===
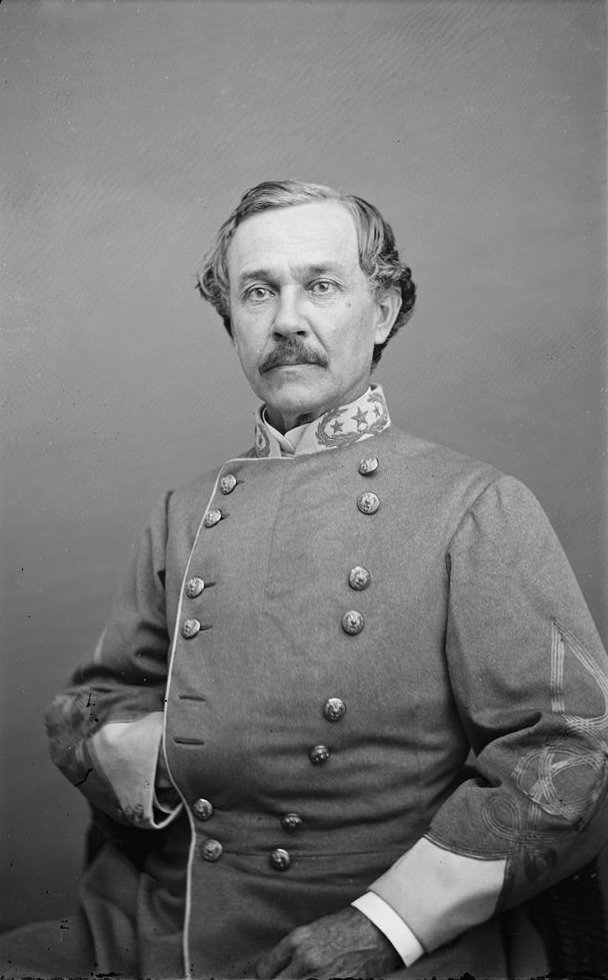
Joseph Reid Anderson in Confederate officer's uniform

In 1841, the owners turned management over to a 28-year-old civil engineer named Joseph Reid Anderson who proved to be an able manager. Anderson acquired ownership of the foundry in 1848, after two years of leasing the works, and was soon doing work for the United States government. Anderson began introducing slave labor to cut production costs. By the beginning of the Civil War in 1861, half of the 900 workers were slaves, including many in skilled positions. By 1860, Anderson's father-in-law Dr. Robert Archer had joined the business and Tredegar became a leading iron producer in the country.

The commissioning of 900 miles of railroad track in Virginia, largely financed by the Virginia Board of Public Works between 1846 and 1853, offered a further market in steam locomotives and rail stock. One of those attributed with starting the Tredegar Locomotive Works with John Souther was Zerah Colburn, the well-known locomotive engineer and journalist. The company produced about 70 steam locomotives between 1850 and 1860. From 1852 to 1854, John Souther also managed the locomotive shop at Tredegar. Its locomotive production work is sometimes listed with combinations of the names Anderson, Souther, Delaney, and Pickering. Tredegar also produced the steam propulsion plants for the USS Roanoke (1855) and the USS Colorado (1856).

Prior to the Civil War, industry expanded at the Tredegar site under Anderson's direction to include a new flour mill on land leased to Lewis D. Crenshaw and a stove works on land leased to A.J. Bowers and Asa Snyder. By 1860, Crenshaw and Co. had established the Crenshaw Woolen Mill on adjoining land they owned. This enterprise employed more than 50 people. The Crenshaw Woolen Mill became "the principal source of supply for the [Confederate] Army's requirements of uniform material" during the first half of the Civil War. A May 16, 1863 fire on the Tredegar/Crenshaw site damaged the mill, which was not rebuilt, and Tredegar purchased the land from Crenshaw and Co. by 1863.

=== American Civil War ===
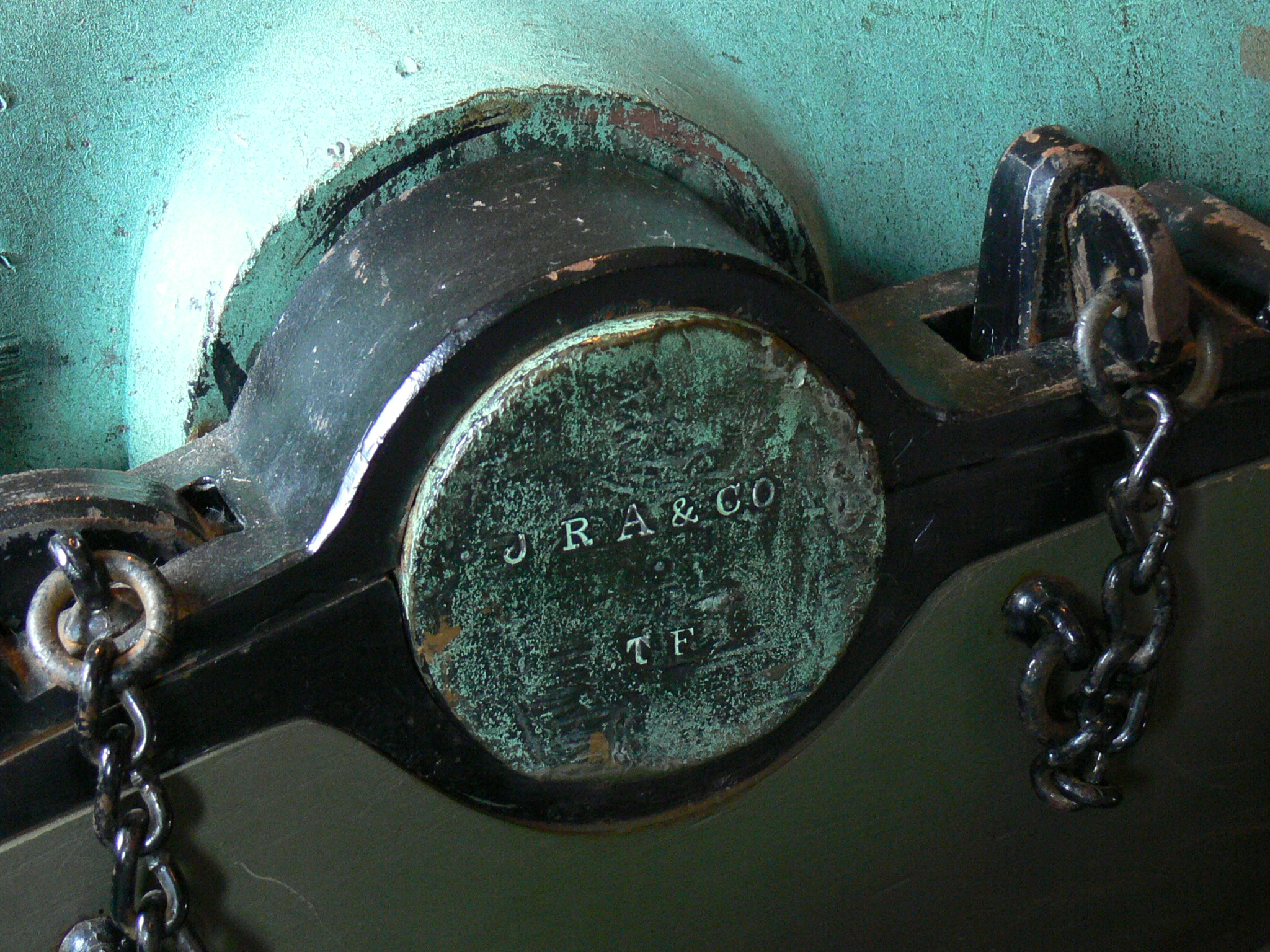
Trunnion from a bronze cannon stamped "J R A & CO, T F" (J.R. Anderson & Company, Tredegar Foundry) made at the Tredegar Iron Works

By 1860, the Tredegar Iron Works was the largest of its kind in the South, a fact that played a significant role in the decision to relocate the capital of the Confederacy from Montgomery, Alabama, to Richmond in May 1861. Tredegar supplied high-quality munitions to the Confederacy throughout the war, until the capture of Richmond in 1865.

Its wartime production included the iron plating for the first Confederate ironclad warship, the CSS Virginia which fought in the historic Battle of Hampton Roads in March 1862; credit for approximately 1,100 artillery pieces during the war, about half of the South's total domestic production of artillery during the war years of 1861–1865, including the development and production of Brooke rifles; large rifled cannons intended for the nascent CSA Navy and an answer to the rifled, armor piercing, Dahlgren Guns favored by the Union. One Brooke Rifle was even used as a rail-mounted siege cannon, armored with plate made at Tredegar. The company also manufactured railroad steam locomotives in the same period.

As a result of his difficulties competing with Northern industries due to his higher labor and raw material costs, Anderson was a strong supporter of southern secession and became a Brigadier General in the Confederate Army as the war broke out. He was wounded at Glendale during the Seven Days Battles of the Peninsula Campaign in 1862 and served in the Ordnance Department for the duration of the Civil War.

As the war continued with more and more men conscripted into the Confederate armies, Tredegar experienced a lack of skilled laborers. Scarce supplies of metal also hurt the company's manufacturing abilities during the war, and as the conflict progressed it was noticed that Tredegar's products were beginning to lose quality as well as quantity. Even in the summer of 1861, soon after the beginning of the Civil War, metal was so scarce that the iron works failed to produce a single piece of artillery for an entire month.

By 1864, Tredegar was producing nine different types of projectiles for the Confederacy, compounded by the many types of foreign built and captured weapons. Then in June 1864, Hunter's cavalry destroyed the company's best gun iron furnaces, drastically reducing ordnance production by July and August when existing stockpiles ran out. Thus it cast 128 weapons during the first six months of 1864, but only 85 pieces during the last half of the year, and most of those guns were of questionable quality. Worse yet, Anderson noted that because of the depreciated Confederate currency and the government's failure to pay invoices (the Niter and Mining Bureau alone owed the firm $300,000, plus the Ordnance Department had not paid its account since October 4 and the navy and Railroad Bureau were also deeply in arrears). Thus, in December Tredegar on many occasions requested the government take over its blast furnace (and the problem of acquiring and provisioning slaves), but even after extensive negotiations (and a 2-week shutdown for repairs in early January, the company's financial distress only grew, with over $1 million in outstanding bills by February 1, 1865, and Anderson had to borrow $100,000 to meet its first payroll for the month. During the evacuation of Richmond by the Confederates on the night of April 2–3, 1865, the retreating troops were under orders to burn munitions dumps and industrial warehouses that would have been valuable to the North. The Tredegar battalion defended the works despite widespread looting in the nearby warehouse district. However, despite Gorgas' order not to destroy ordnance facilities, the mob set fire to the arsenal, causing an explosion that shattered nearly every window. Nonetheless, facing resistance at the plant itself, the mob retreated to the town center. As a result, the Tredegar Iron Works is one of few Civil War-era buildings that survived the burning of Richmond.

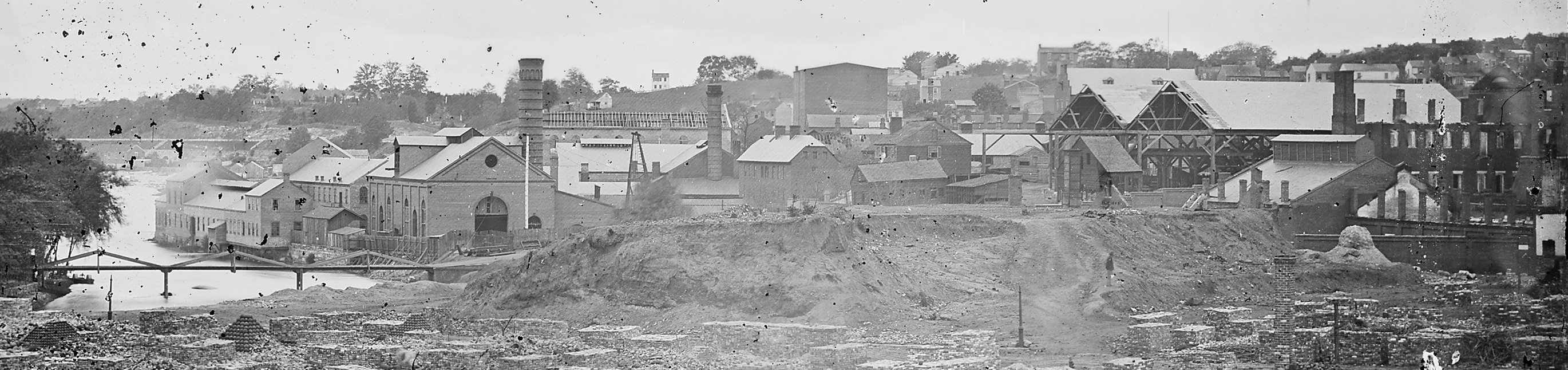
Tredegar Ironworks and associated facilities, as it appeared shortly after the fall of Richmond in 1865
(Present-day surviving structures italicized)

1	1861 Gun Foundry
2	Crenshaw Woolen Mills (Pattern Building)
3	Old foundry

4	Offices
5	Haxall Canal
6	Rolling mills of the Richmond Armory

7	Richmond Armory (destroyed in the Evacuation Fire)

=== After the Civil War ===
At the outset of hostilities, Anderson had wisely secured Tredegar assets overseas for the duration of the Civil War and, therefore, was able to restore his business when the Confederate currency collapsed. He petitioned U.S. President Andrew Johnson for a pardon for himself and Tredegar and was back in business before the end of 1865, regaining full ownership in 1867. That same year, Tredegar incorporated with a stock of $1,000,000.

Francis Thomas Glasgow, the father of Virginia writer and suffragist Ellen Glasgow, was a manager at Tredegar Iron Works, and Joseph Reid Anderson was her maternal uncle.

By 1873, Tredegar Iron Works was employing 1,200 workers and was a profitable business. However, the Panic of 1873 hit the company hard, and as a result of financing difficulties it did not transition to steel, and so faded from national prominence.

The neighborhood of Oregon Hill cropped up as a company town-like development. When Joseph Anderson died on a vacation in New Hampshire in 1892, he was succeeded by his son Colonel Archer Anderson. The Tredegar company remained in operation into the mid-20th century, providing small arms and munitions to U.S. forces during the Spanish–American War, World War I and World War II. In 1957, Anderson's descendants sold the land to the Albemarle Paper Company. After acquiring and merging with Ethyl Corporation in 1962, the company began restoration of the extant buildings and later submitted a nomination for Tredegar's listing on the National Register of Historic Places.

== Preservation as a Civil War museum site and tourist attraction ==
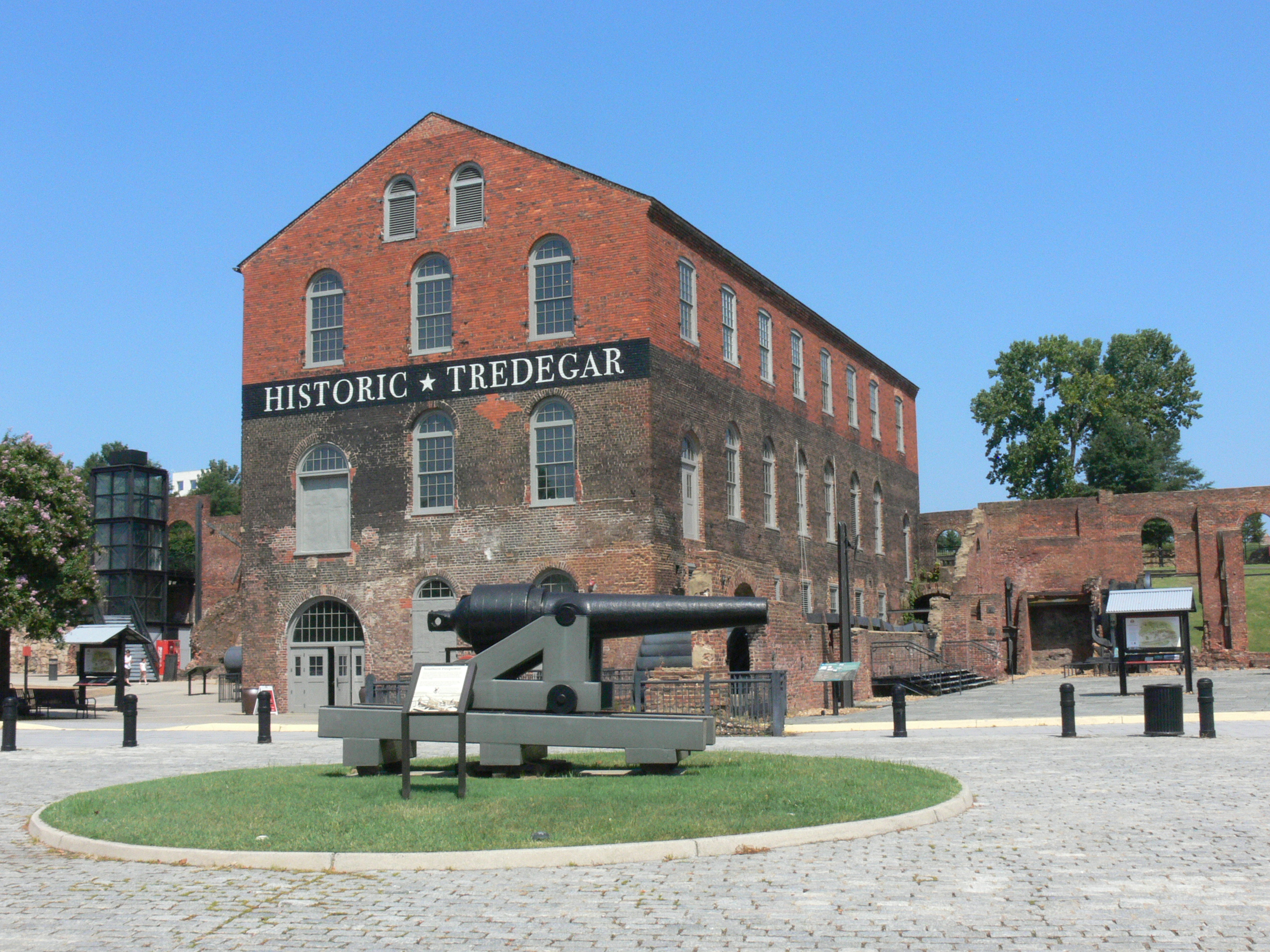
The Pattern Building, now used as the main visitors' center for Richmond National Battlefield Park

In the 21st century, the buildings at the Tredegar site have been preserved through development of the site to commemorate the Civil War. The site is also used for various festivals and public events such as the Richmond Folk Festival.

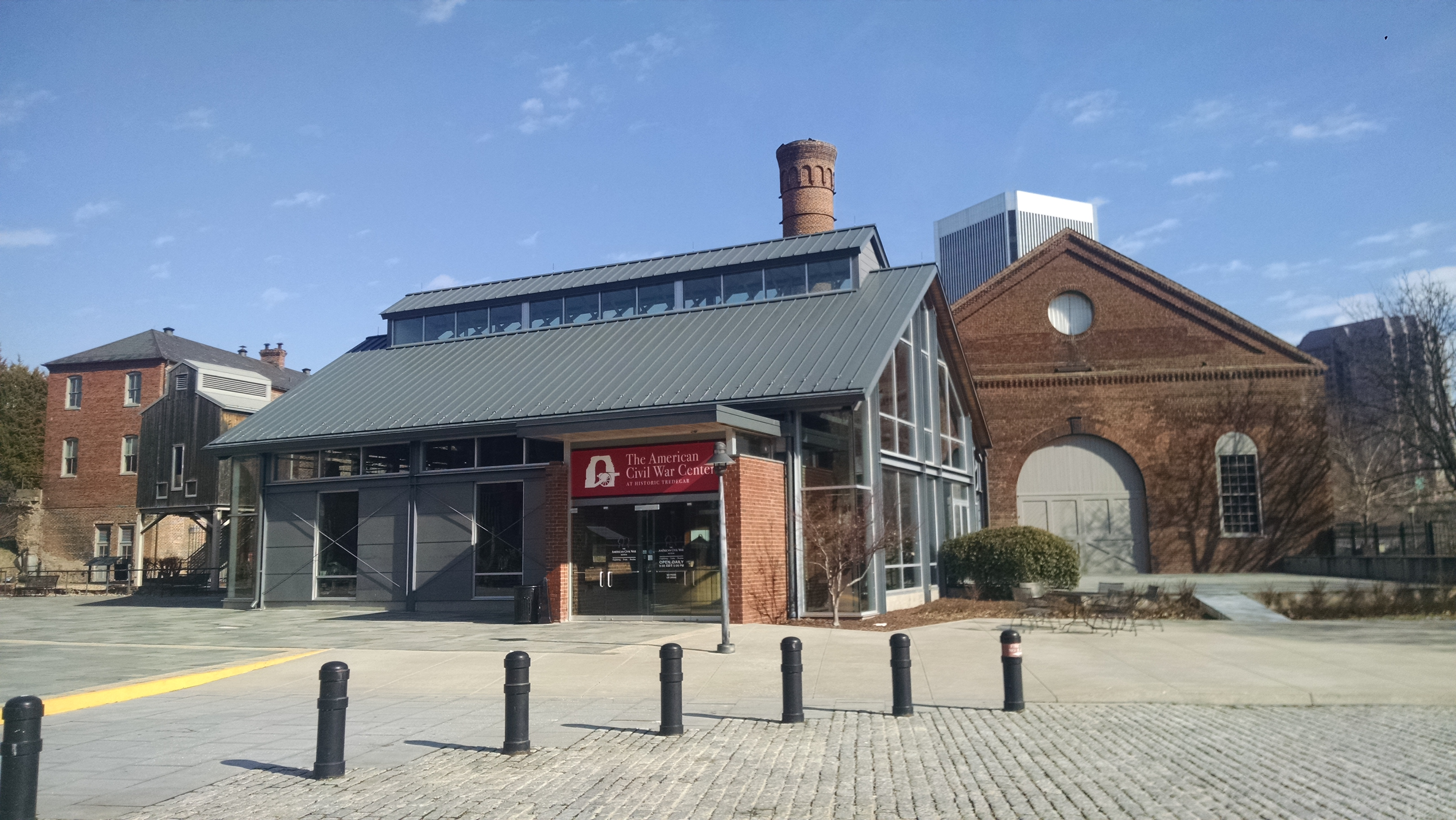
The American Civil War Center at Historic Tredegar, now part of the American Civil War Museum, is a separate museum at the former Tredegar Ironworks

The Pattern Building is used as the main visitors' center for Richmond National Battlefield Park. The American Civil War Museum at Historic Tredegar is a separate museum at the former Tredegar Ironworks.

=== Valentine Riverside ===
In the 1990s, the Court End-based Valentine Museum opened a second museum site at the Tredegar Ironworks. The focus of the museum experience was industrial history. Interpretive tours to and from the site covered industrial history, African American history, and Civil War history. The venture, however, was short-lived. The "Valentine on the James" opened on Memorial Day 1994 and closed to the public on Labor Day 1995.

=== Civil War Visitor Center at Tredegar Iron Works ===
The main visitor center for Richmond National Battlefield Park opened at the Tredegar Iron Works site in June 2000. The Civil War Visitor Center at Tredegar Iron Works is located in the restored pattern building and offers three floors of exhibits, an interactive map table, a film about the Civil War battles around Richmond, a bookstore, and interpretive NPS rangers on site daily to provide programs and to aid visitors.

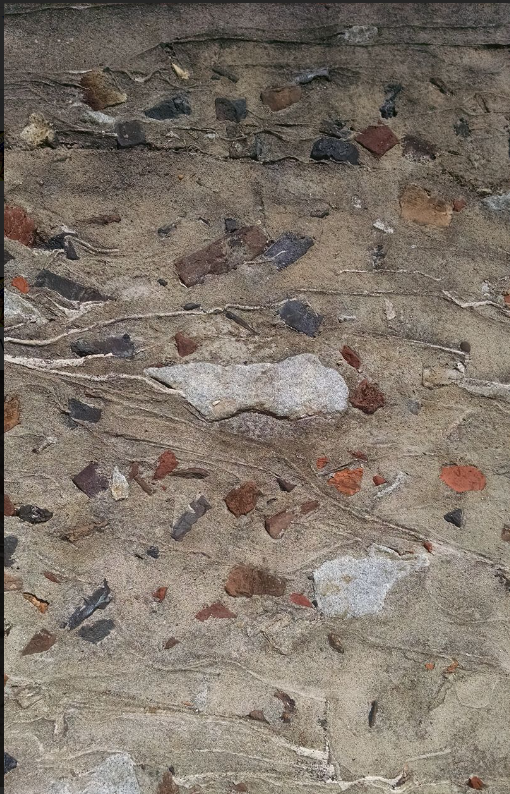
Old Wall at Tredegar

=== Lincoln statue ===
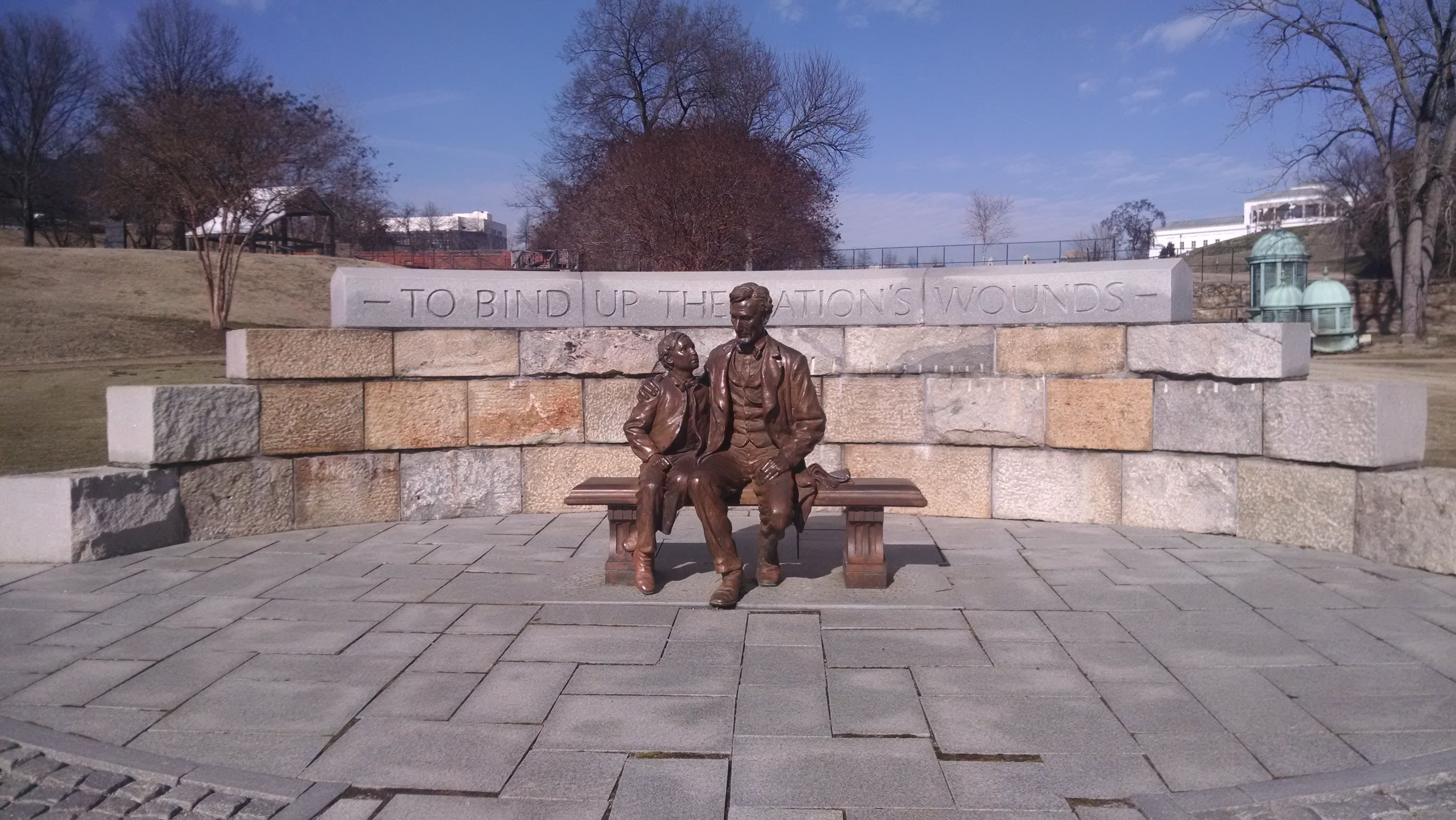
Statue of Abraham Lincoln and his son

In 2000, the former Tredegar Iron Works facility overlooking the James River near downtown Richmond became the site of the main Visitor Center of the Richmond National Battlefield Park. Sculptor David Frech of Newburgh, New York, was commissioned by The United States Historical Society of Richmond to commemorate the historic arrival of Abraham Lincoln and his son Tad Lincoln and their tour of the burnt-out Union-captured Richmond, Virginia, April 4, 1865, 10 days before his assassination.

Funds were raised by the Historical society through donations and the selling of miniature versions of the statue as well as bronzed resin copies. The statue, much like the Arthur Ashe Monument, received a wide array of criticism for its placement. Traditionally reserved for statues of key figures of the Confederacy protests were held at the unveiling April 5, 2003, namely by the Sons of Confederate Veterans. Robert H. Kline, chairman of the historical society, the Richmond-based nonprofit company that commissioned the statue stated that the statue was for the purpose of reconciliation "He came on a mission of peace and reconciliation and I think the statue will serve that purpose for a very long time."

Dignitaries at the installation ceremony included former governors Douglas Wilder and Gerald L. Baliles, former mayor of Richmond, then-Lt. Governor, and future Governor Tim Kaine, and then-Mayor of Richmond Rudy McCollum. The dedication ceremony was buzzed by a plane trailing a banner proclaiming Sic semper tyrannis, which is not only Virginia's motto (meaning "Thus always to tyrants"), but also what John Wilkes Booth, according to his diary, called out while assassinating Lincoln.

The statue is made of a bronze cast depicting Lincoln and his son Tad on a bench with Lincoln's arm around his son. The bench was deliberately made long enough so that viewers may sit next to either statue on the bench to take photographs. The words "To Bind Up The Nation's Wounds" from Lincoln's Second Inaugural Address are carved into granite behind them.

=== American Civil War Center at Historic Tredegar ===
The idea of another museum on the site was realized in 2006 when the American Civil War Center at Historic Tredegar opened to the public. James M. McPherson described the museum as "a truly comprehensive exhibit and education center weaving together Union, Confederate, and African-American threads ... much needed for future generations to understand how the Civil War shaped the nation." The Center contains interactive theaters, plasma-screen maps, and artifacts. The museum's exhibits were put together by a team of historians that included James M. McPherson of Princeton, Bill Cooper of Louisiana State University, John Fleming of the Cincinnati Museum Center, Charles Dew of Williams College, David W. Blight of Yale and Emory Thomas at the University of Georgia. In November 2013 the Civil War Center was merged with the Museum of the Confederacy and became the American Civil War Museum in January 2014.

== See also ==
- List of National Historic Landmarks in Virginia
- National Register of Historic Places listings in Richmond, Virginia
