= Tredegar =

Town in Wales

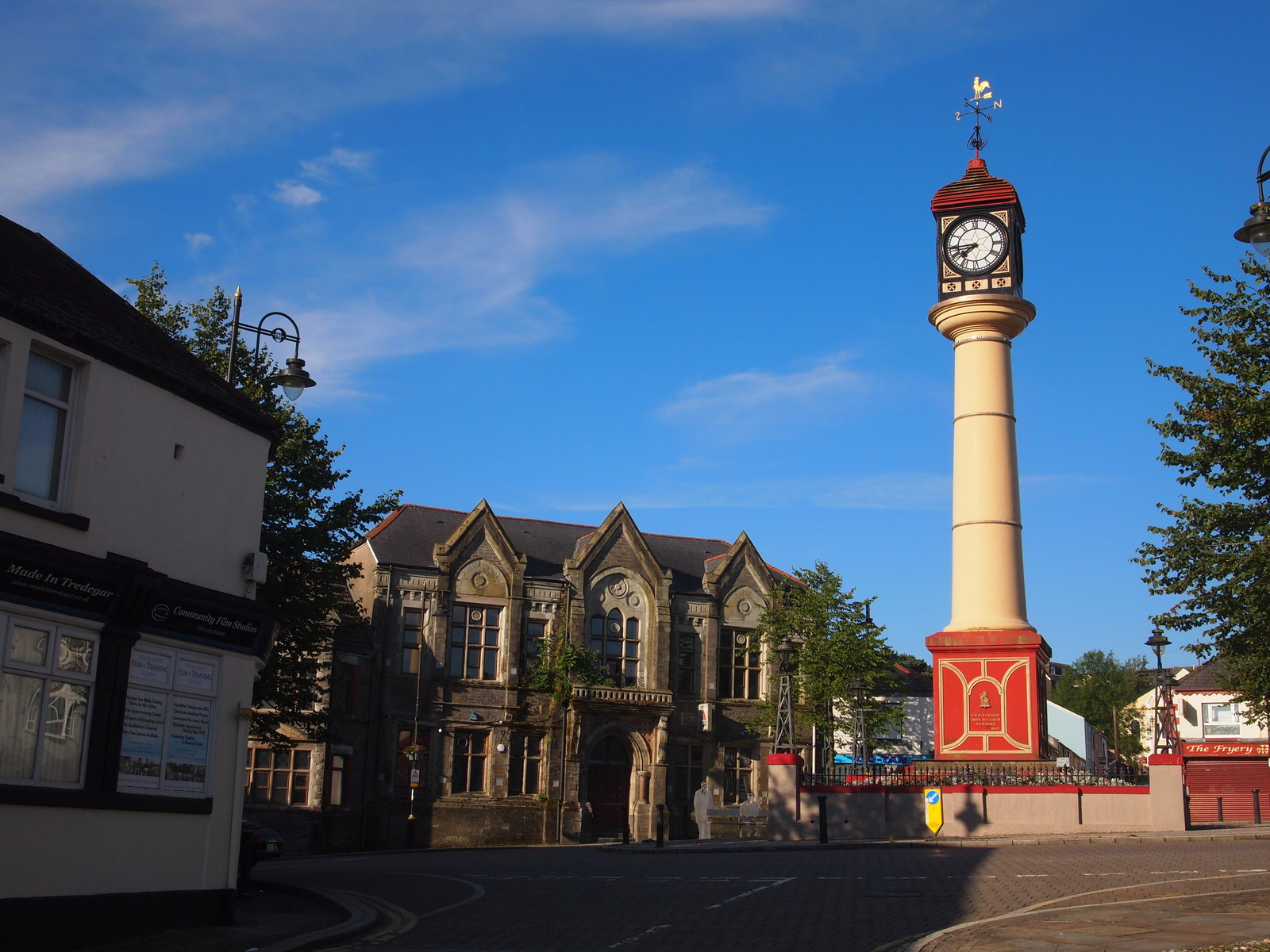
- The town clock and former town hall

- Location within Blaenau Gwent
- Population: 15,103 (2011)
- OS grid reference: SO145095
- Community: Tredegar
- Principal area: Blaenau Gwent
- Preserved county: Gwent
- Country: Wales
- Sovereign state: United Kingdom
- Post town: TREDEGAR
- Postcode district: NP22
- Dialling code: 01495
- Police: Gwent
- Fire: South Wales
- Ambulance: Welsh
- UK Parliament: Blaenau Gwent and Rhymney
- Senedd Cymru – Welsh Parliament: Blaenau Gwent
- List of places UK Wales Blaenau Gwent 51.77761°N 3.24069°W Map of the community

Tredegar (/trəˈdiːɡər/; Welsh: [trɛˈdeːɡar]) is a town and community situated on the banks of the Sirhowy River in the county borough of Blaenau Gwent, in South East Wales. Within the historic boundaries of Monmouthshire, it became an early centre of the Industrial Revolution in Wales. The relevant wards (Tredegar Central and West, Sirhowy and Georgetown) collectively listed the town's population as 15,103 in the UK 2011 census.

== Toponymy ==
Tredegar was originally part of the Tredegar Estate, the seat of which was in Coedcernyw, outside Newport, and which extended northwards to include almost the entire length of the Sirhowy Valley. Local historian Oliver Jones (1969) writes that, by c.1803, the new town that had been created after the completion of the Furnace No 3 of the local iron works:

...was becoming known far and wide as Tredegar Iron Works and not as Tredegar as would be expected, the town not having or being allowed to have an identity apart from the industry that sustained it. And as Tredegar Iron Works it continued to be known for many years. Tombstones in the old Cholera Cemetery on Cefn Golau describe the victims of the 1832 and 1848 epidemics as "natives of the Tredegar Iron Works" and as late as the 1860's letters were still being addressed, for example, to "Mr. John Lewis, East Lane, Tredegar Iron Works.' (op. cit.: 41) (italics in original)

The previous analysis is supplemented by the fact that company's buildings appeared on the 1832 Ordnance Survey map as 'Tredegar Iron Works'. Jones didn't state when the name of the new town was shortened to 'Tredegar'. But when its name was shortened, it resulted in the existence of two Tredegars, one at each end of the estate: one at the top of the Sirhowy Valley and the other outside Newport.

In 1881, Octavius Morgan, the fourth son of Sir Charles Morgan of Tredegar, had published his etymology of the name of his ancestral home, which he had republished in 1886. He divided his etymology into two parts, about the Welsh adjective 'tref' and the noun 'degar'. He began by dismissing four derivations of 'tref': 'the foot of the camp', 'ten plough-lands', 'ten acres' and 'two forts', which he described as 'conjectural'. He then proposed his derivation, which he described as 'most obvious' and 'the true one' – that 'tref' means 'the dwelling place, chief mansion, or homestead of some important person'. Morgan then cited a poem, a manuscript and a pedigree in support of his proposal that 'degar' was derived from an historical personage called 'Teigr', whose name was changed to 'Deigr' to enable euphony (see the entry for the term in Phonaesthetics), which in turn was styled as 'degyr, which then in another context presumably became 'Degar'.

Bartrum (2009, originally 1993) explicitly concurred with Octavius Morgan in the entry for "Deigr ap Dyfnwal Hen (Legendary)" in his A Welsh Classical Dictionary, while Osborne and Hobbs (1992) and Owen and Morgan (2007) implicitly did so.

In the local Welsh dialect known as Gwenhwyseg, the name was often pronounced as Tredecar (with provection of /g/ to /k/). There was also a shortened form Decar.

== History ==
=== Industrialisation ===
Tredegar became industrialised because the local availability of easily accessible iron ore and the three natural resources which enabled iron production:

- wood, which was used to produce charcoal as a fuel
- coal, which was used to produce coke as a fuel
- water, from the fast-flowing Sirhowy River, which could be used for scouring (separating the topsoil from the underlying iron ore).

There is disagreement about the date when the first furnace was built locally. In his 1903 History of the iron, steel, tinplate and ... other trades of Wales, Charles Wilkins described a charcoal-fired furnace, Pont Gwaith yr Haiarn [alternatively 'Hearn'] ('the bridge iron works'), four miles south of Tredegar, as 'one of the oldest places on the hills for ironmaking.' He cited in support of his description the Rev. R. Ellis ('Cynddelw'), who had claimed, 'many years ago', that old inhabitants 'fixed the earliest date of working there as at the close of seventeenth century, probably about 1690.' (ibid.)

In contrast, local author David Morris ('Eiddil Gwent') related in his Hanes Tredegar his conversation with an old lady, 'Mrs Thomas', who told him that her father and husband's relations had worked in the furnace at Pont Gwaith yr Hearn, next to the Sirhowy River, four miles south of Tredegar. The furnace was developed by two Bretons and worked by men from Penydarren, Merthyr Tydfil. Morris concluded that they had built the furnace 'about the year 1738 or 1739.'

Local historian Oliver Jones cast doubt on the claim of David Morris in his 1969 book The early days of Sirhowy and Tredegar. He commented that "when the Bretons arrived in 1738 they simply took over a works which had been in existence for many years."

There is also disagreement about the next furnace that was built locally, the coal-fired Sirhowy Furnace. Evan Powell claimed in his 1884 History of Tredegar that it was erected 'a few years' after the closure of the Pont Gwaith yr Hearn furnace, by a Mr Kettle of Shropshire. Oliver Jones also cast doubt on this claim. He commented: 'neither maps nor documents support [Powell] .... Nor does Kettle, the name of the man who is supposed to have built it at that time, appear anywhere in the records.'

However, there is agreement that a furnace was built 'near the confluence of Nant Melin brook and the river Sirhowy at the place then called Aber-Sirhowy' in 1778, by manual workers who were hired by a consortium of four men: Thomas Atkinson, a merchant from York, and three businessmen from London, William Barrow, Bolton Hudson and John Sealy, who were 'involved in the tea and grocery trade'. The consortium secured a forty-year lease on local lands from Charles Henry Burgh, who had inherited the estate of his father, the Rev. Henry Burgh. It employed miners who drove coal levels into the hillsides at Bryn Bach and Nantybwch, the first small-scale coal mining operation in the area, for the coal-fired furnace. (Oliver Jones documented that, from the mid-1780s, 'coal mining became more systematic and much better organised'.) Other trades that the consortium employed included furnacemen, furnace helpers, smiths, cokers, masons and mule drivers.

=== Tredegar Ironworks ===
In 1800, Samuel Homfray, with partners Richard Fothergill and Matthew Monkhouse, signed a lease from the Tredegar Estate in Newport which enabled the creation of the Tredegar Iron Company, which was named in deference to Sir Charles Morgan of Tredegar House in Newport. Previously, Tredegar 'contained only three houses'. In 1891, the company ceased production of iron, but continued to develop coal mines and produce coal. The former Tredegar Ironworks were effectively abandoned, with Whiteheads taking over the southern section of the site from 1907. In 1931, they also closed down their operations, moving everything to their Newport works. TICC continued to develop coal mines and work pits, until it was nationalised in 1946, becoming part of the National Coal Board.

The Tredegar Iron Works in Richmond, Virginia, United States was named in honour of the town.

=== Tredegar Circle ===
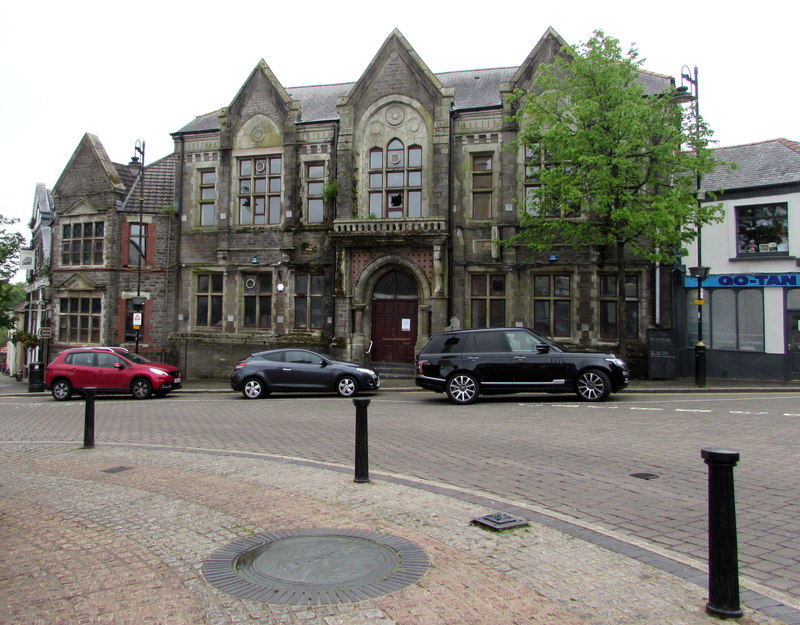
The former Tredegar Town Hall

Samuel Homfray, an iron master who managed to obtain a large parcel of land in and around Tredegar, is to be thanked for Tredegar Circle and the wide streets running out from it. He showed a great concern about the state of the current streets and how narrow they were, deciding that his new town would have wide streets running out from a central place. Tredegar Circle was first known as 'The Square', but as buildings and shops developed around it people within Tredegar began to refer to it as 'The Circle'.

The town clock which stands in the middle of Tredegar Circle was once where the town stocks resided, with there being records of people being put into the stocks to be punished for petty misdemeanours. People being punished within the stocks would have their legs trapped in the stocks, being kept outside for hours in all weather conditions.

Prostitution was rife within Tredegar Circle, almost having a reputation of being a 'red light district' in the earlier days.

Tredegar Circle was also seen as being an important 'shopping centre', many local tradespeople would go there to set up stalls and sell their wares to the people within Tredegar, before the town clock was erected. Horses and carts loaded with goods would clatter around Tredegar Circle, with almost every type of produce being available to buy within Tredegar Circle. Tredegar Town Hall, a prominent building in The Circle, was rebuilt in 1892.

Tredegar Circle is also known for the pubs that occupy it, although there have been many that have closed down over the years such as the Greyhound Inn and the Freemasons, both once very popular with local workers. There have been many reported arrests within Tredegar Circle, in both present and earlier days, due to drunken and disorderly behaviour.

== Welsh language ==
According to the 2011 Census, 5.4% of Tredegar Central and West's 6,063 (328 residents) resident-population can speak, read, and write Welsh. This is below the county's figure of 5.5% of 67,348 (3,705 residents) who can speak, read, and write Welsh.

== Riots ==
The town is known for its three major riots. In 1868, there were the election riots, which took place after the locals' favourite candidate, Colonel Clifford, was not elected.

Secondly in 1882, there was a major anti-Irish riot in Tredegar. There had been a large Irish community in Tredegar since the 1850s, and for a while there had been tensions. Reports from the time vary, however where they all concur includes the fact the riot began with stone throwing and quickly escalated with Irishmen's homes being destroyed and furniture burned in the streets. The Irish were run out of Tredegar and some were beaten. Troops from Newport and Cardiff had to be called in to quell the violence

Thirdly, there were the anti-Jewish riots of 1911, which some called a pogrom, when Jewish shops were ransacked and the army had to be brought in. Though Jewish businesses and property were attacked, nobody was killed in this riot.

== Foundation ==
Samuel Homfray and his partners needed accommodation for their workers, and so needed to develop a suitable town. The land on the eastside of the Sirhowy river was owned by Lt.Col. Sir Charles Gould Morgan who granted a lease in 1799 to build Tredegar Ironworks Company. In 1800, Homfray married Sir Charles daughter Jane, and hence improved his lease terms. The west bank of the river was owned by Lord Tredegar, and hence in the short term remained undeveloped.

Homfray was a hard task master. He sold franchises to business people who wanted to operate within his town, from which he would take a percentage. He paid his workers in his own private coinage, so that they could not easily spend their wages outside the town. However, the opportunity to work created a boom town, which with a parish population of 1,132 in 1801 had boomed to 34,685 by 1881, in part boosted by the laying of the 24 miles (39 km) stretch of horse drawn track to Newport in 1805.

But all of this development came at a price. Adrian Vaughn, in his 1985 book Grub, Water & Relief, mentions that in 1832 John Gooch took a managerial post in the Tredegar iron works:

Utterly remote at the head of the Sirhowy valley, the town was a man-made hell. Men and children worked killing hours in the smoke and filth of the foundries and were maimed by molten metal. Their only medical help was that administered by the 'Penny Doctor.' Wages were paid in Homfray's private coinage — banks were not allowed in the town — so workers spent their coins in Homfray's shops, buying food at Homfray's prices. Poverty and malnutrition followed and disease followed both.

There were several cholera epidemics in the town in the 19th century, and a dedicated cholera burial ground was established at Cefn Golau.

== Governance ==
=== Links with the Labour Party ===
Tredegar has strong links with prominent Labour MPs and the history of the Labour Party and the Labour Movement in Britain as a whole. It was the birthplace of Aneurin Bevan, who was responsible for the introduction of the British National Health Service (NHS), and who in the 1920s was involved in the management of Tredegar General Hospital. Neil Kinnock, leader of the Labour Party from 1983 to 1992, was born in Tredegar in 1942 and lived there for most of his early life, attending the town's Georgetown Infants and Junior Schools between 1947 and 1953. His predecessor as leader, Michael Foot, was Labour MP for the local constituency — Ebbw Vale — during his time as party leader. As part of the once safe Labour constituency of Blaenau Gwent, Tredegar was for a period represented by the independent left-wing politician Dai Davies until the general election of 2010, when it reverted to Labour.

== Architecture ==
=== Bedwellty House ===
Bedwellty House is a Grade II listed house and gardens. Originally a "low thatched-roof cottage", the old house was renovated in 1809. The present Bedwellty House was built in 1818 as a home for Samuel Homfray, whose Iron and Coal Works were the main local employers for much of the 19th century. The surrounding 26-acre (11 ha) Victorian garden and park, designed originally as a Dutch garden around which one could walk or ride without being confronted by gate, fence or outside features, contains the Long Shelter, also a Grade II listed structure built for the Chartist Movement.

=== Town Clock ===
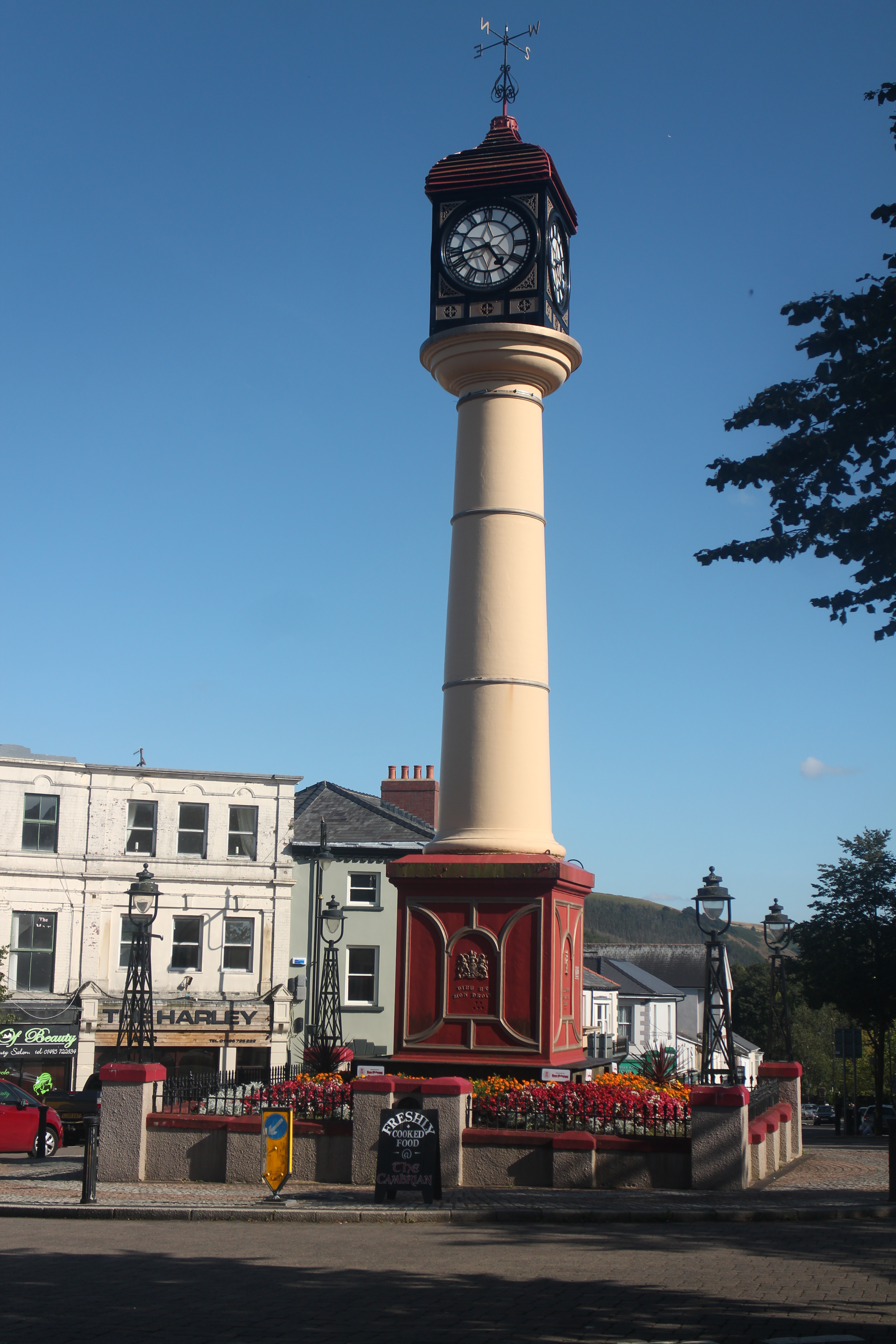
The clock, erected 1858

One of Tredegar's main attributes is the Town Clock, erected in 1858, which dominates the southern part of the town centre. The clock was made by J. B. Joyce & Co of Whitchurch, Shropshire and was the idea of Mrs. R. P. Davies, the wife of the Tredegar Ironworks manager, who had decided that she wanted to present a "lofty illuminated clock", and it was she who decided that it would be erected in the Circle.

"The clock tower is seventy-two feet high. The foundation is of masonry, on which is surmounted the cast-iron base which has four arms from each corner to a distance of sixty feet at a depth of five feet and six inches (150 mm) below ground level. The pillar is wholly composed of cast-iron, upon a square pediment which in turn, receives a rectangular plinth, and upon this stands a cylindrical column of smooth surface and symmetrical diameter, ornamented with suitable coping on which rests the clock surrounded with a weather vane. The plinth is inscribed on the four aspects, on the south side - Presented to the town of Tredegar from the proceeds of a bazaar promoted by Mrs. R.P. Davis. Erected in the year 1858. On the west side is effigy of Wellington, with the legend - Wellington, England's Hero. On the North, the Royal Arms of England; and on the east, the name and description of the founder with his crest, - Charles Jordan, Iron Founder, Newport, Mon. The clock is provided with four transparent faces or dials, each five feet three inches diameter, and these were illuminated originally by gas, but this was later changed to electricity. The minute hands are each two feet two inches long, and the hour hand one foot seven inches long. The clocks mechanism is a fifteen inches (380 mm) mainwheel strike, with a single four-legged Gravity Escapement driving the four dials. It has a 1¼ second pendulum and the bob weighs two hundredweight".

The clock stopped working in January 2007 due to rain water affecting the rebuilt electrical mechanism. A campaign was set up to petition the council to repair the clock before its 150th anniversary in 2008. Further repairs were necessary in 2020, which were undertaken by Smith of Derby Group.

== Climate ==
Climate data for Tredegar (1991–2020)
Month	Jan	Feb	Mar	Apr	May	Jun	Jul	Aug	Sep	Oct	Nov	Dec	Year
Record high °C (°F)	14.4 (57.9)	17.5 (63.5)	21.0 (69.8)	23.4 (74.1)	26.8 (80.2)	29.1 (84.4)	30.8 (87.4)	30.5 (86.9)	26.5 (79.7)	24.5 (76.1)	19.1 (66.4)	12.6 (54.7)	30.8 (87.4)
Mean daily maximum °C (°F)	6.3 (43.3)	6.7 (44.1)	8.9 (48.0)	12.2 (54.0)	15.4 (59.7)	17.8 (64.0)	19.5 (67.1)	19.8 (67.6)	16.7 (62.1)	13.0 (55.4)	9.3 (48.7)	6.8 (44.2)	12.7 (54.9)
Daily mean °C (°F)	3.8 (38.8)	3.8 (38.8)	5.6 (42.1)	8.0 (46.4)	11.0 (51.8)	13.7 (56.7)	15.5 (59.9)	15.6 (60.1)	13.0 (55.4)	10.0 (50.0)	6.6 (43.9)	4.2 (39.6)	9.2 (48.6)
Mean daily minimum °C (°F)	1.2 (34.2)	1.0 (33.8)	2.2 (36.0)	3.8 (38.8)	6.5 (43.7)	9.6 (49.3)	11.5 (52.7)	11.5 (52.7)	9.2 (48.6)	6.9 (44.4)	3.9 (39.0)	1.7 (35.1)	5.8 (42.4)
Record low °C (°F)	−12.4 (9.7)	−9.6 (14.7)	−9.4 (15.1)	−4.6 (23.7)	−2.5 (27.5)	2.2 (36.0)	2.0 (35.6)	3.8 (38.8)	−0.4 (31.3)	−4.0 (24.8)	−9.3 (15.3)	−12.6 (9.3)	−12.6 (9.3)
Average precipitation mm (inches)	206.2 (8.12)	157.3 (6.19)	125.8 (4.95)	102.9 (4.05)	101.2 (3.98)	83.8 (3.30)	105.8 (4.17)	115.3 (4.54)	124.9 (4.92)	189.3 (7.45)	184.9 (7.28)	218.8 (8.61)	1,715.9 (67.56)
Average precipitation days (≥ 1.0 mm)	18.0	12.7	15.3	12.6	12.2	10.0	11.6	11.4	12.3	16.7	17.0	16.9	166.5
Mean monthly sunshine hours	40.1	69.4	107.1	159.2	183.8	175.6	191.3	171.5	137.1	83.7	57.6	45.9	1,422.1
Source 1: Met Office (precipitation days 1981-2010)
Source 2: Starlings Roost Weather

== Culture and leisure ==
The Tredegar Town Band, which takes part in national competitions, was founded in 1849.

Tredegar Orpheus Male voice choir, which takes its name from Orpheus, the Greek god of music, was founded in 1909.

Tredegar is home to rugby union teams Tredegar Rugby Football Club who play in the Swalec League Division Two East and Tredegar Ironsides Rugby Football Club. The club was formed in 1946. There is also the nearby Tredegar and Rhymney Golf Club.

Tredegar is home to Bryn Bach Park, a country park.

The municipality is home to the Blaenau Gwent Film Academy, an educational organization that provides film production training for youth aged 7 to 18. Works produced through the academy include short films such as Life of a Plastic Cup and Stationary Bike, an adaptation of a short story by Stephen King.

== Local schools ==
- Two dame schools prior to 1828
- The Town School opened in 1837
- Earl Street mixed Junior & Infants Schools in 1876
- Georgetown schools in 1877. First Headmistress in 1878
- Georgetown Senior Boys School in 1904
- Sirhowy School
- Tredegar Grammar School
- Tredegar Secondary Modern
- Thomas Richards Centre
- Tredegar Comprehensive school
- Deighton primary school
- Glanhowy primary school
- Georgetown primary school (rebuilt 2004)
- St. Joseph's R.C. school
- Brynbach primary school

== Transport ==
The need for transport development came from Tredegar's industrialisation. By 1805, a joint venture between the Tredegar Iron Company and the Monmouthshire Canal resulted in the early development of what became the Merthyr, Tredegar and Abergavenny Railway, connecting Tredegar to Newport Docks through 24 miles (39 km) of tramway. Originally powered by horses, in 1829 Chief Engineer Thomas Ellis was authorised to purchase a steam locomotive from the Stephenson Company. Built at Tredegar Works and made its maiden trip on 17 December 1829. In 1865, the railway was extended north to Nantybwch to meet the LNWR. The railway declined with the industrial works, and Tredegar railway station closed with the Beeching Axe in 1963. The closest railway stations now are in Ebbw Vale, Rhymney and Abergavenny.

The proposed South Wales Metro includes a station in Tredegar, using the line closed by British Railways as part of their Beeching modernisation plan.

For much of the 20th Century Tredegar was served by two bus companies: Red & White Services Ltd (based in Chepstow) and Hill's of Tredegar (a local family-owned business). Red & White can trace their services in the town back to 13 June 1921, when John Watts & partner started the Valleys Motor Bus Services running two routes from Tredegar. Their operation expanded and by 1930 had become Red & White Services. The company had a large depot in the town and built a brand new Bus Station (in front of the depot building) which was opened 30 January 1959 by then local MP Aneurin Bevan.

== Carreg Bica Isaf ==
In October 2013, a local farmer was jailed for ten months after he permitted 4,700 loads of waste to be illegally dumped on his land, earning £283,000. A spokesmen for Natural Resources Wales hoped the case would show that people could not profit from illegal dumping.

== Filming location ==
Tredegar has been used for numerous TV and film locations, including The District Nurse starring Nerys Hughes. In 1982, a televised version of the A.J. Cronin novel, The Citadel, was filmed in Tredegar, starring Ben Cross. The series was based partly on Cronin's experiences as a doctor in the town, where he had worked for the Tredegar Medical Aid Society in the early 1920s. This society contributed the model which established the British National Health Service. Aneurin Bevan who launched the Health Service in 1948 said ""All I am doing is extending to the entire population of Britain the benefits we had in Tredegar for a generation or more. We are going to 'Tredegarise' you"

Just north of Tredegar lies the Trefil region. Trefil found new fame in 2005 when it was used as a location for the alien Vogon homeworld in the film of Douglas Adams's book The Hitchhiker's Guide to the Galaxy.

In 2011, the Trefil Region was once again used as a filming location for a major Hollywood production when parts of a sequel to Clash of the Titans was filmed there.

In the Doctor Who universe, Trefil has featured as the Ood home planet and in The Sarah Jane Adventures.

On 13 May 2008, the car crash scene for short film Cow was filmed on the Tredegar bypass. 'Cow' was produced by Gwent Police and Tredegar Comprehensive School to highlight the dangers of texting while driving. The movie was made available online and received widespread attention, featuring on TV news programs, in newspapers and internet forums worldwide.

On 25 January 2010, the independent movie A Bit of Tom Jones? premiered at Leicester Square, London. Filmed in and around Tredegar, using local people and professional actors, the film was funded by local businesses.

The Doctor Who episode The Hungry Earth was filmed in Bedwellty Pits in 2010.

In 2018, the news of Blaenau Gwent film Academy (based in Tredegar's Little Theatre) was set to adapt the Stephen King's short story 'Stationary Bike' spread literally around the world, all of which would be filmed in Tredegar and the nearby Trefil region.

== Notable people ==
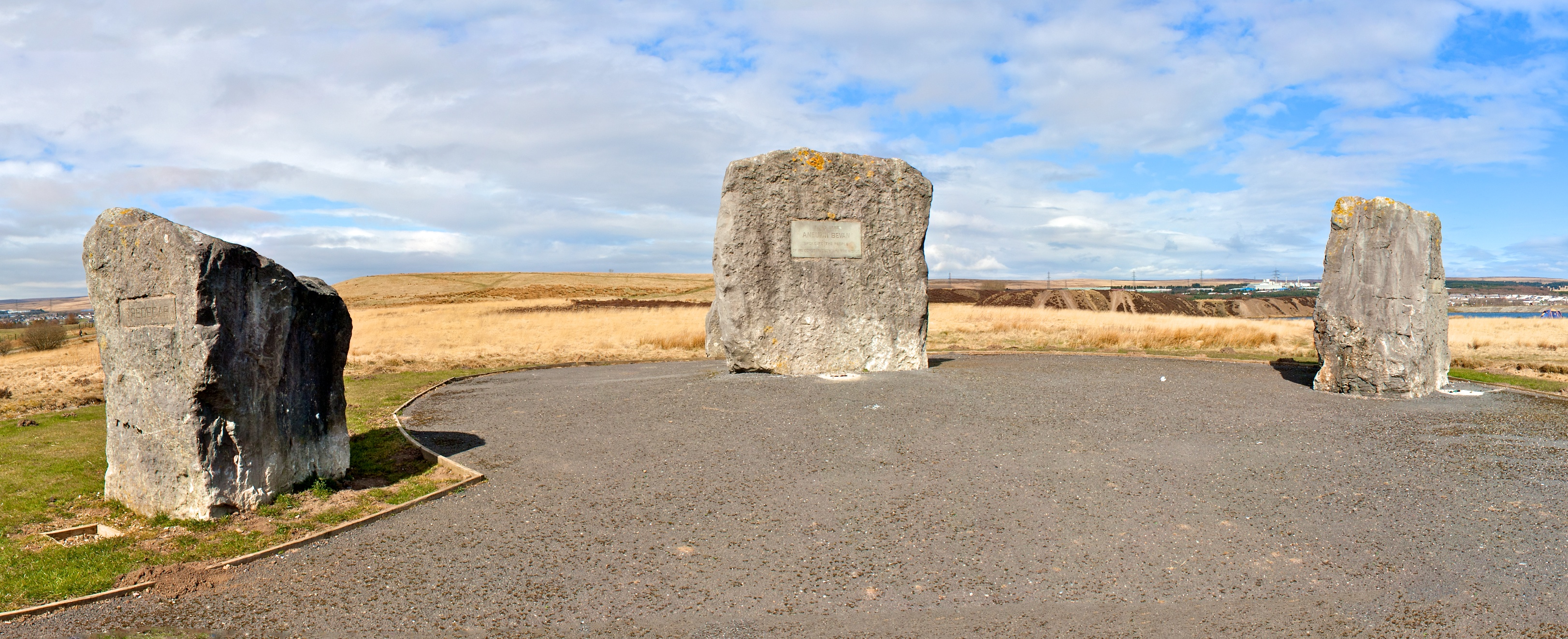
The Aneurin Bevan Stones were erected to commemorate where he held open air meetings with constituents.

See also Category:People from Tredegar

- Anterior, five-piece melodic death metal band
- Aneurin Bevan, Labour statesman, founder of the National Health Service and Member of Parliament for Ebbw Vale (1929–60)
- Mark Colbourne, gold and silver medallist at the 2012 Summer Paralympics
- Walter Conway, Secretary of the Tredegar Medical Aid Society, the model which established the National Health Service
- George Cording, cricketer who played as a wicket-keeper for Glamorgan County Cricket Club
- Vincent Cronin, historical, cultural, and biographical writer, especially of the Renaissance period
- Alun Davies, Labour Assembly Member for the Mid and West Wales region
- James Davis, United States Secretary of Labor, U.S. Senator from Pennsylvania, founder of Moose International, the Grand Lodge of Moose in Great Britain
- Bradley Dredge, professional golfer on the PGA European Tour
- Jonathan Evans, Conservative former Member of Parliament for Cardiff North
- Bert Gray, footballer who played as a goalkeeper for Tranmere Rovers and the Welsh national team
- Mark Jones, dual-code rugby player who played for both Welsh national teams and Great Britain in rugby league
- Patrick Jones, poet, playwright, and filmmaker, known for collaborating with the Manic Street Preachers
- Neil Kinnock, Member of Parliament for Bedwellty and Islwyn (1970–95), Leader of the Labour Party, European Commissioner and Life Peer as Baron Kinnock of Bedwellty.
- Stephen Kinnock, Labour Member of Parliament for Aberafan Maesteg, formerly Aberavon, (2015 to date), business executive and husband of Danish Prime Minister, Helle Thorning-Schmidt
- Stuart Lane, rugby union player for Cardiff RFC, Wales, and the British and Irish Lions
- John Lewis, footballer for Cardiff City and Newport County
- Douglas McKie (1896–1967) chemist
- Nicki McNelly, Anglican priest, former Provost of St John's Cathedral, Oban
- Christopher Meredith, poet, novelist and faculty of University of Glamorgan
- Tracey Moberly, artist, author and radio show host, best known for her politically focused work
- David Morgan, cricket administrator, former President of the International Cricket Council and chairman of the England and Wales Cricket Board and Glamorgan County Cricket Club
- Glyn Parry, historian and faculty of Victoria University of Wellington
- Garyn Preen, footballer who currently plays for Merthyr Town
- Berwyn Price, gold and silver medallist at the 1974 and 1978 Commonwealth Games
- Ray Reardon, six-time World Championship-winning snooker player
- Moses Russell, football player for Plymouth Argyle and the Welsh national team
- Nick Smith Labour Member of Parliament for Blaenau Gwent (2010-)
- Jason Strange, rugby union player for many clubs, currently at Ebbw Vale RFC
- Philip Weekes, mining engineer and manager of the National Coal Board's South Wales coalfields
- Bryan White, former mayor of Tredegar and senior member of the Loyal Order of Moose in Great Britain
- Arthur Henry Williams, trade union organiser and Member of the House of Commons of Canada for Ontario
- Denzil Williams (born 1938), Rugby Union player for Wales and the British and Irish Lions
- Phil Williams, scientist and Plaid Cymru Assembly Member for the South Wales East region (1999–2003)
- Cliff Wilson, World Amateur Championship-winning snooker player
- Nicky Wire, lyricist, bassist and occasional vocalist of the Manic Street Preachers

== Twin towns ==
Tredegar has been twinned with Orvault in south-east Brittany since 1979.

== See also ==
- Bedwellty Union Workhouse
- Cefn Golau
- Tredegar Iron and Coal Company
- Tredegar Medical Aid Society
