= Open Country =

Designation for some UK access land

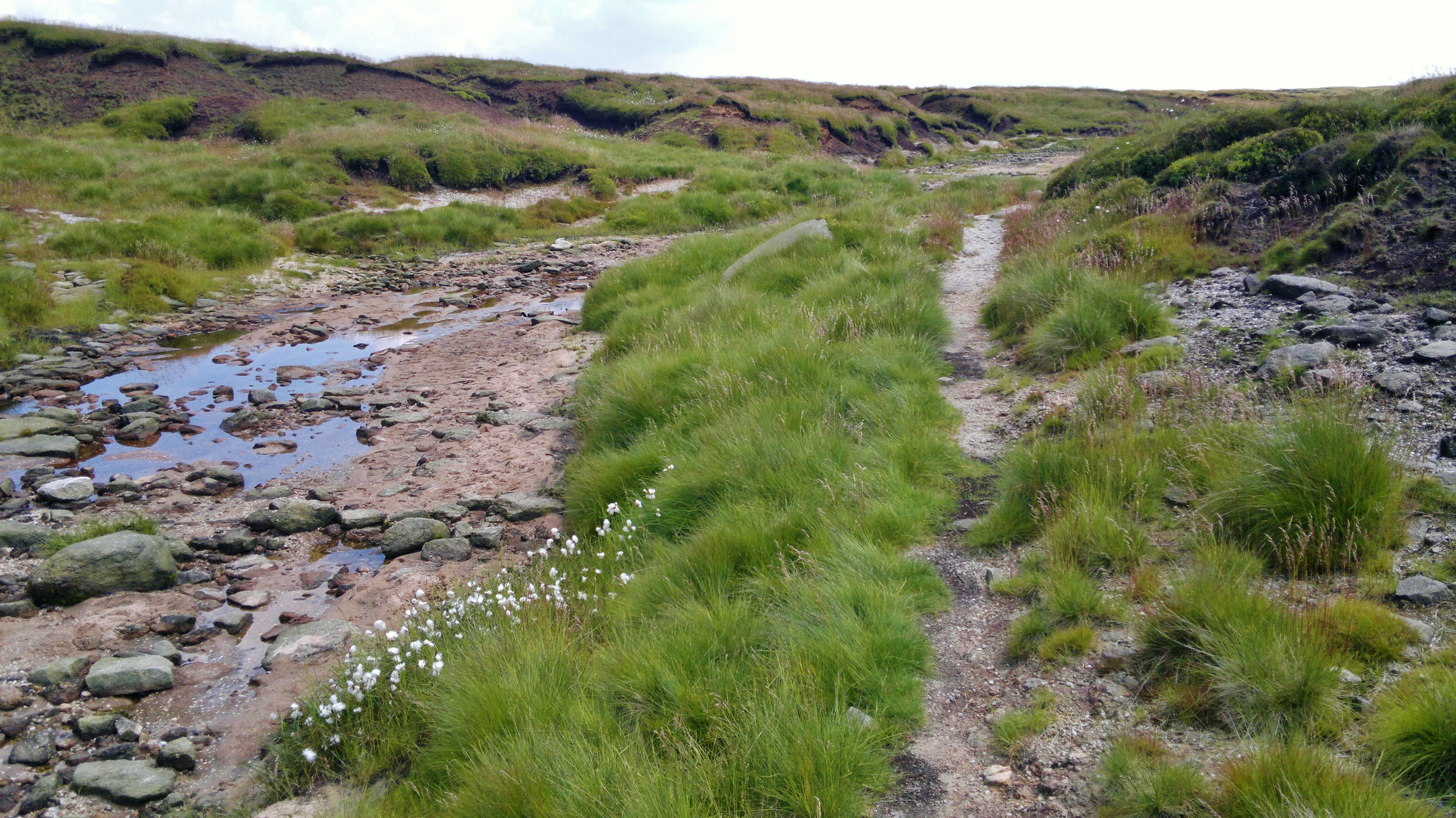
A river on Kinder Scout, an area of England designated as Open Country

"Open Country" is a designation used for some access land in England and Wales.

It was first defined under the National Parks and Access to the Countryside Act 1949 (and extended by the Countryside Act 1968), and was land over which an appropriate access agreement had been made. In particular significant upland areas of the northern Peak District received the designation, where there had been much dispute over access prior to World War II, including the 1932 mass trespass of Kinder Scout.

The term is also used in the Countryside and Rights of Way Act 2000 to describe 'areas of mountain, moor, heath and down' that are generally available for access under that Act. (It appears that the rights conferred by this new definition are in general less comprehensive than those conferred under the 1949 Act, but will apply to a wider area.)

The Countryside Agency's publication Managing Public Access appears to envisage that most land originally designated under the 1949 Act will in due course receive redesignation under the CRoW Act, as the original access agreements lapse.

== See also ==
- Country park
- Open country
