= Sirhowy Valley =

Valley in south Wales

Coordinates: 51.779°N 3.233°W

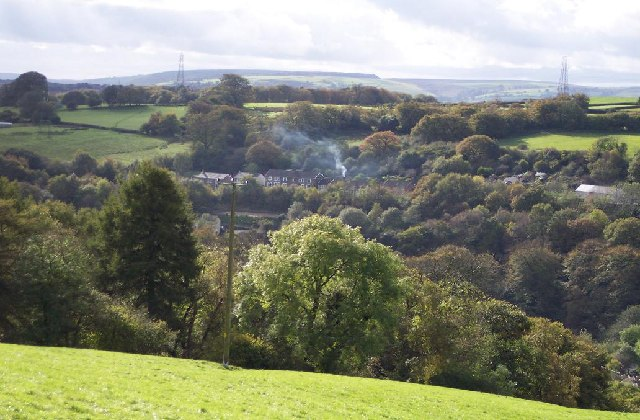
Pen-deri farm and the hamlet of Gwrhay taken from on the Sirhowy Valley Walk climbing up from Argoed.

The Sirhowy Valley (Welsh: Glyn Sirhywi) is an industrialised valley in the eastern part of the Valleys region of Wales. It is named from the Sirhowy River (Welsh: Afon Sirhywi) which runs through it. Its upper reaches are occupied by the town of Tredegar within the county borough of Blaenau Gwent. The valley initially runs south-southeast between the ridges of Cefn Manmoel to the east and Mynydd Bedwellte to the west before turning to a more southerly direction. Its central section is one of the least populated of the Welsh coalfield valleys. The valley enters the county borough of Caerphilly, which contains the towns of Blackwood (Welsh: Y Coed Duon) and Pontllanfraith. It then turns east and joins the valley of the Ebbw River, Ebbw Vale at Crosskeys.

== History ==
The valley's industrial history began with ironworks before evolving to meet the demand for coal and the expansion of coal mining. This process was led by companies such as the Tredegar Iron and Coal Company. Coal mines used to be located throughout the valley, including: Wyllie; Nine Mile Point and Oakdale. The Sirhowy passes the old Gelligroes Mill near Blackwood along its path.

Prior to the Beeching Axe, the valley was served by the Sirhowy Railway, with stations at many points including Nantybwch, Argoed, Blackwood, Pontllanfraith and Ynysddu.
