= Ebbw Valley Walk =

The Ebbw Valley Walk is a 16 miles (26 km)-long recreational walk which runs from Festival Park in Ebbw Vale southwards to the Sirhowy Valley Country Park west of Risca in South Wales. The route is managed and maintained by Caerphilly County Borough Council who published a 24-page booklet promoting the route in 1996 though this is no longer in print.
