= Tredegar Iron and Coal Company =

19th century ironworks in Wales

For the ironworks in the US state of Virginia, see Tredegar Iron Works.

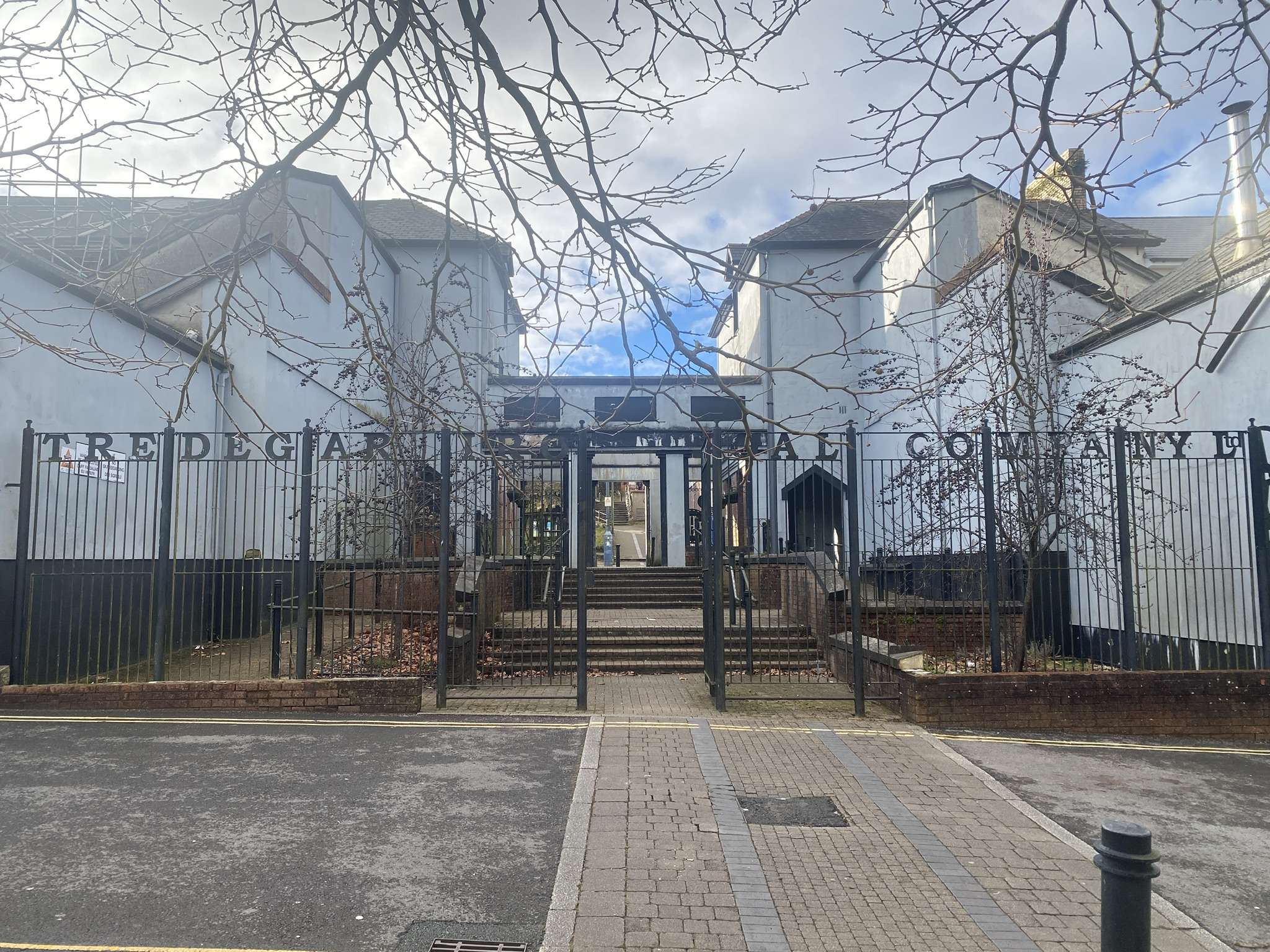

Tredegar Iron and Coal Company was an important 19th century ironworks in Tredegar, in the historic county of Monmouthshire in South East Wales. Because of its need for coke, it became a major developer of coal mining in the Sirhowy Valley of South Wales and in the South Wales Valleys generally. The Company is associated more widely with the onset of the Industrial Revolution in South Wales.

== Origin ==
In 1797, Samuel Homfray, with partners Richard Fothergill and the Revd. Matthew Monkhouse land at Sirhowy from the Tredegar Estate and built a furnace which they called the 'Sirhowy Ironworks'. In 1800, the company was renamed the 'Tredegar Iron Works' in honour of the 'Tredegar Estate' at Tredegar House and Tredegar Park in Newport. The ironworks were taken over by the Harfords of Ebbw Vale in 1818 and was expanded in the late 1830s and early 1840s, producing significant volumes of rails, largely for export. The works was purchased by the 'Tredegar Iron Company Limited' in 1873 and nine years later began to produce steel.

== Development ==
The ironworks were developed on a single site, which later became known as 'Whiteheads', after which the company took over the southern section of the site in 1907. By 1850, the company employed between 2,000 and 3,000 people at its nine furnaces, mills shops and ancillary plants. However, all of this production on such a vast scale had a price. When John Gooch John Gooch, a manager of an iron foundry in Bedlington, Northumberland, took a managerial post in the Tredegar Ironworks in 1831:

'Tredegar was a strange place to go, voluntarily .... Utterly remote at the head of the Sirhowy valley in Monmouthshire, the town was a man-made hell. Men and children worked killing hours in the smoke and filth of the foundries and were maimed by molten metal. Their only medical help was that administered by the "Penny Doctor". Wages were paid in Homfray's private coinage — banks were not allowed in the town — so workers spent their coins in Homfray's shops, buying food at Homfray's prices. Poverty and malnutrition followed and disease followed both.'

With many people in such a small area, and with poor sanitation provision, three cholera epidemics in the town in the 19th century, in 1832-33, 1849-50 and 1866. A dedicated cholera burial ground was created at Cefn Golau for the first outbreak and served for the burials of the following two outbreaks.

=== 1875-1946 ===
In 1875, the company renamed itself the 'Tredegar Iron and Coal Company,' to allow development of additional coal mining capacity. In 1891, the company ceased production of iron, but continued to develop coal mines and produce coal. The former Tredegar Ironworks were effectively abandoned, with Whiteheads taking over the southern section of the site from 1907. In 1931, they also closed down their operations, moving everything to their Newport works. The 'Tredegar Iron and Coal Company' continued to develop coal mines and work pits, until it was nationalised in 1946, becoming part of the National Coal Board. Its last chairman was Henry McLaren, 2nd Baron Aberconway.

During the 1910's and 1920's Aneurin Bevan worked for the Company at the Ty-Trist Colliery, Bedwellty pit and from where he was fired for being a union leader. The poor conditions in the pits and collieries of the Tredegar Iron and Coal Company motivated Bevan to create the National Health Service.

Though now almost entirely redeveloped, traces of the terracing of the valley sides at the site can still be noted at OS grid reference SO 155093.

== Mines developed by the company ==
- 1806: The Dukes Pit, Tredegar.
- 1806: Pwll Mawr, Neath
- 1834: Trist No.1 and No.2 pits
- 1841: Upper Ty Trist Pit
- 1850: Bedwellty Pits
- 1868: Trist No.3 Pit
- 1876: Witworth Colliery
- 1876: Pochin Colliery
- 1898: McLaren Colliery
- 1907: Oakdale Colliery
- 1908: Waterloo Colliery
- 1910: Markham Colliery
- 1926: Wyllie Colliery
