= Gwent Healthcare NHS Trust =

Former NHS trust in Wales

Gwent Healthcare NHS Trust was an NHS Trust in South East Wales.

The Trust was launched in April 1999 through the merger of Glan Hafren, Gwent Community Health and Nevill Hall and District NHS Trusts. It was abolished in October 2009 when the Aneurin Bevan Local Health Board took over both the functions of the NHS Trust and existing Local Health Boards.

The Trust was one of the largest and busiest in the UK with acute hospitals at Newport, Abergavenny and Caerphilly, supported by twenty community hospitals and extensive community, mental health and learning disability services.

It employed 12,500 staff, of whom one thousand were doctors, including 250 consultants and 5,500 nurses, midwives or health visitors.

== Hospitals ==
Headquarters: Llanfrechfa Grange Hospital, Cwmbran

- Aberbargoed Hospital, Aberbargoed
- Abertillery and District Hospital, Abertillery
- Blaenavon Hospital, Blaenavon
- Blaina & District Hospital, Blaina
- Caerphilly District Miners Hospital, Caerphilly
- Chepstow Community Hospital, Chepstow
- County Hospital, Pontypool
- Ebbw Vale Hospital, Ebbw Vale
- Llanfrechfa Grange Hospital, Cwmbran
- Maindiff Court Hospital, Abergavenny
- Monnow Vale Integrated Health and Social Care Facility, Monmouth
- Nevill Hall Hospital, Abergavenny
- Oakdale Hospital, Blackwood
- Redwood Memorial Hospital, Rhymney
- Royal Gwent Hospital, Newport
- St Cadoc's Hospital, Caerleon, Newport
- St Woolos Hospital, Newport
- Tredegar General Hospital, Tredegar
- Ysbyty'r Tri Chwm, Ebbw Vale
- Ystrad Mynach Hospital, Ystrad Mynach
