= Ysbyty'r Tri Chwm =

Ysbyty'r tri Chwm
- Aneurin Bevan University Health Board
- Shown in Blaenau Gwent

Geography
- Location: Ebbw Vale, Blaenau Gwent, Wales, United Kingdom
- Coordinates: 51.791875°N 3.216699°W

Organisation
- Care system: Public NHS
- Type: Specialist

Services
- Speciality: Mental health

History
- Founded: 1996

Links
- Website: www.wales.nhs.uk/sitesplus/866/page/40510
- Lists: Hospitals in Wales

Ysbyty’r tri Chwm (English: Three Valleys Hospital) is a mental health facility in Ebbw Vale, Blaenau Gwent, Wales. The site was opened in 1996. It is managed by the Aneurin Bevan University Health Board.

== History ==
The hospital was commissioned to replace Pen-y-Fal Hospital in Abergavenny which closed the following year. Ysbyty’r Tri Chwm was officially opened by Glenys Kinnock in July 1996.

The closure of Ebbw Vale Hospital in 2005 led to plans for a new hospital to be built in Ebbw Vale. The site around Ysbyty’r Tri Chwm was originally selected for the new construction. However, councillors later voted for the new Ysbyty Aneurin Bevan to be built on the site of a former steelworks. In 2019, plans were announced to move 15 beds from Ysbyty’r Tri Chwm to Nevill Hall Hospital in Abergavenny when Grange University Hospital in Cwmbran is completed, which is due to be opened in 2021.

== Operations ==
The hospital is located around one mile from Ebbw Vale, near Ebbw Vale College. The site contains two separate day hospitals, Oak Parc and Elm Parc. Between them the two units have 36 mixed gender ward places available for patients over the age of 65 who suffer from mental health issues. A community mental health team is also based at the hospital and provides community based assessments. The hospital is managed the Aneurin Bevan University Health Board.

A wide variety of activities are encouraged at the centre, including painting, exercise, music and gardening: there is a sensory garden onsite. The hospital also contains a dining room and cafe, enclosed garden space and a gym. A sensory garden was also installed in 2005 after work from local school pupils and volunteers.
