= Fflecsi =

Demand-responsive bus service in Wales

fflecsi
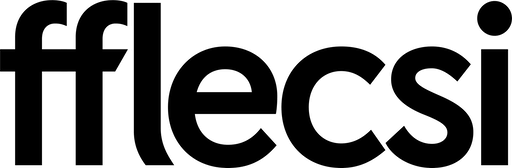

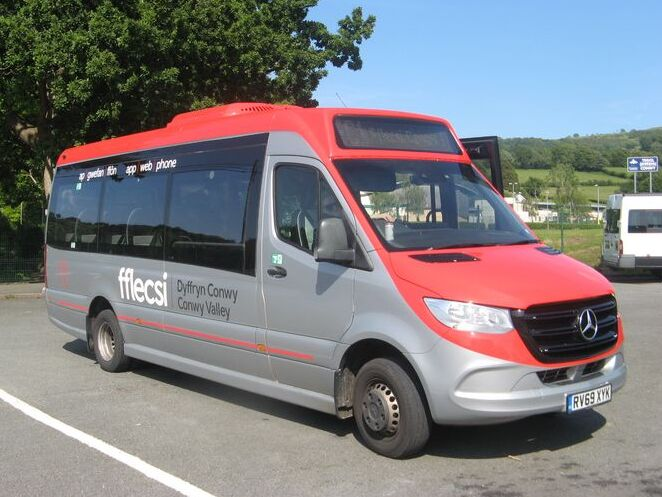
- fflecsi Mercedes-Benz Sprinter minibus near Llanrwst, Conwy in June 2025
- Parent: Transport for Wales (Welsh Government)
- Founded: 18 May 2020
- Locale: Wales, United Kingdom Principal areas of: Blaenau Gwent; Cardiff; Carmarthenshire; Ceredigion; Conwy; Denbighshire; Flintshire; Gwynedd; Newport (former); Pembrokeshire; RCT
- Service area: Buckley; Cardiff North; Conwy Valley; Denbigh; Holywell; Llŷn Peninsula; Newport (former); North Carmarthenshire/South Ceredigion; Pembrokeshire; Prestatyn; Ruthin; Tonyrefail & Tonypandy
- Service type: Demand-responsive bus services
- Hubs: Newport (until Sep 2022)
- Annual ridership: 7,000 (Newport; May–Sept 2020); 23,000 (Blaenau Gwent; June–Dec 2022)
- Operator: Alpine Travel; M&H Coaches; NAT Group; Newport Bus (former); Pembrokeshire Voluntary Transport; P&O Lloyd Coaches; Stagecoach South Wales; Townlynx
- Website: www.fflecsi.wales

Fflecsi (stylised fflecsi; Welsh pronunciation: [flɛksi]) is a trial demand-responsive bus service administered by Transport for Wales (TfW) and local authorities, operated by local bus operators across Wales. Pilot trials of the service are conducted across Wales, which included a city-wide trial in Newport until September 2022. The effectiveness of the service is being monitored as full bus services resume in Wales during the COVID-19 pandemic. During the pilots, fflecsi will replace some pre-existing scheduled bus routes in the service areas where it operates. The technology behind the service is made by ViaVan, and the pilot is funded by the Welsh Government, to invest in new approaches to public transport in Wales as part of their Llwybr Newydd strategy. The pilot was included in Welsh Labour's manifesto for the 2021 Senedd election, as part of their plan to increase investment in bus services, and reducing Wales' carbon emissions.

Passengers book and pay for journeys via an app (or telephone call), which then matches passengers travelling between similar points, calculating an ad hoc route to the destinations required within the route's service area. Most routes have a fixed start and end destination. The on-demand bus service scheme is charged with normal bus fares, with provisions for seasonal and pre-purchased tickets, MyTravelpass, and 60+ or disabled concessionary travel card. Payments are taken using either a contactless card or Smartcard, although some services may accept cash payments.

By the beginning of September 2020, fflecsi had recorded over 7,000 journeys on its service since its launch in mid-May 2020, according to the Welsh Government. In September 2020, up to 48% of all journeys were from the Newport service as being the only one at the time primarily operating in a city centre. The Newport pilot service ended on 25 September 2022. Services in rural areas were shown to increase passenger demand when compared to the previous fixed bus operations. From May 2020 to May 2021, it had recorded 50,000 trips on its then seven pilot services across Wales, with four being single bus routes.

== History ==
=== Pilot scheme ===
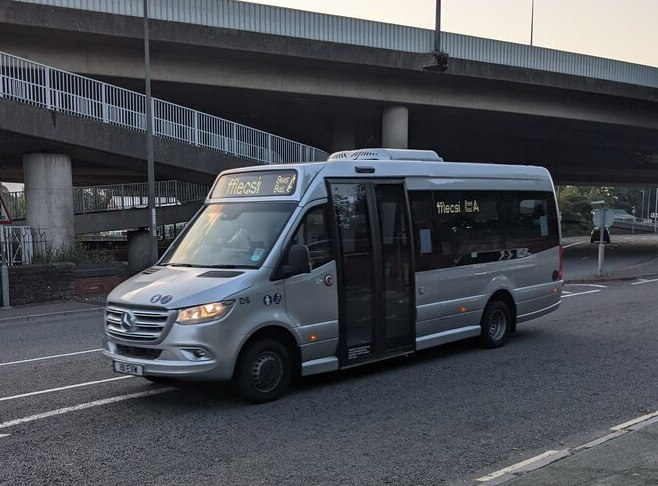
Fflecsi minibus on Malpas Road, Newport, in August 2021 for Newport's pilot service

Fflecsi was first introduced in Newport on 18 May 2020 in co-operation with Newport Transport (Newport Bus). The following day, a briefing was hosted to introduce the concept to Pembrokeshire, another area where fflecsi aims to operate.

On 25 June 2020, it was announced that NAT Group (New Adventure Travel), in partnership with Cardiff Council and TfW, would launch a DRT service for the fflecsi G1 route, replacing the pre-existing G1 NAT Group route, between Gabalfa and Gwaelod-y-Garth via Whitchurch. The service commenced on 29 June, and operated as a trial for three months.

On 20 July 2020, fflecsi started operating in Rhondda Cynon Taf, taking over the 152 route in partnership with Stagecoach (previous sole-operator of the 152 route) and the local council. The route is from Tonypandy and Hendreforgan, stopping in destinations in the communities of Penygraig, Williamstown, Penrhiwfer, Tonyrefail and Thomastown.

On 3 August 2020, the trial service started operating in north Wales. Fflecsi was rolled out in Denbigh and Prestatyn, in co-operation with Denbighshire County Council and local bus operators.

In late August 2020, Newport Bus announced that the 26/26A route to St Julians would be discontinued on 1 September, however, they later reversed the decision and announced that area 1 services will continue. Although reports of stranded passengers followed as confusion over the reinstatement still lingered, with drivers saying their services didn't serve the areas some passengers booked for, whilst the app allowed such bookings.

On 5 October 2020, fflecsi started operating in Pembrokeshire by Pembrokeshire Voluntary Transport.

On 9 November 2020, fflecsi started operating in the Conwy Valley by Alpine Travel.

In the same month, the final recommendations of the Burns report, chaired by Lord Burns, on behalf of the South East Wales Transport Commission, stated that "[Fflecsi] may be able to augment these [regular] services, especially where time of day or low density of population makes regular services unsustainable". However, the report recommends that fflecsi be treated as a complement to the existing scheduled bus network rather than a replacement.

On 30 December 2020 the Deputy Minister for Economy and Transport, Lee Waters, announced that the transfer of £800,000 of Welsh Government funding in the 2020–21 and 2021–22 financial years to Newport Transport had been agreed, in order to extend fflecsi across the City of Newport for the next nine months. On 24 March, Waters further stated: "We are also extending our on-demand fflecsi buses to cover the whole of the Newport City local bus network, showcasing Wales as a world-leader in demand-responsive travel, offering a model for future bus delivery in other parts of Wales."

On 14 June 2021, fflecsi started operating in Blaenau Gwent with Stagecoach.

On 21 June 2021, fflecsi started operating in Holywell, Flintshire, in partnership with Flintshire County Council and P&O Lloyd Coaches, the latter will operate the service. The service serves the Holywell area, connecting residents to Holywell bus station, retail areas, leisure facilities, and medical centres.

On 27 July 2021, it was announced that fflecsi's operations in Newport would be expanded from the two service zones used for fflecsi's first trial in the city to a service covering all of Newport.

In September 2021, fflecsi was included in proposals for the North Wales Metro, potentially expanding its presence to new places in the region. Later in the month, it was announced that fflecsi would be operating the existing Bwcabus service in West Wales as "fflecsi Bwcabus". The 12-year operating service which operates routes between Carmarthenshire, Ceredigion, and Pembrokeshire, is funded by the LINC II scheme, a Welsh Government programme.

On 14 March 2022, the service expanded to Ruthin, Denbighshire. The fleet used for servicing Ruthin, includes a EVM e-Cityline battery-electric minibus, the first zero-emission vehicle of the fflecsi service.

On 27 May 2022, Holywell's service area was announced to be expanded.

On 10 August 2022, fflecsi announced it will expand to Buckley, Flintshire from 15 August 2022. Operated by Prestige Taxis, the area will cover Buckley, Higher Kinnerton, Penyffordd and Hope.

On 12 August 2022, it was announced fflecsi will stop operating in Newport by 25 September 2022, just over a year after the city-wide trial was introduced. Responding to the trial's performance, Transport for Wales stated that Newport's experience with the service was "successful", had provided "substantial data... to improve future public transport route planning", and gave "useful information" on operating the service in an urban setting. Newport Transport would start increasing their bus services in a new timetable from 4 September 2022, for a three-week transition until fflecsi services cease.

Newport's pilot service ended on 25 September 2022, with all nine vehicles used being removed from service. The data collected would be used by Newport Bus to improve its scheduled bus services.

In October 2023, it was announced that the fflecsi Bwcabus service, covering parts of west Wales, was due to end on 31 October.

== Operation ==
Fflecsi buses operate in designated service areas (also known as "zones", where the area is split into segments), where a passenger can board or alight anywhere (i.e. without the use of a bus stop) within the area. The bus will redirect its route to accommodate new requests from passengers to board or alight, whilst retaining the main route (from a fixed start to end destination) to fulfil the needs of all passengers already on board.

Requests for a fflecsi service are booked via a smartphone/tablet app, or a telephone call to fflecsi's call centre, and only during its operational daylight hours.

== Service areas ==
Fflecsi replaces or complements scheduled bus routes within a service area, occasionally configured around the original route (leading to some linear-shaped service areas) and including key destinations such as railway stations, health centres and retail areas. Parts of Wales where fflecsi has replaced multiple bus routes may lead to a broader and larger service area, specifically in rural areas or urban areas connecting to its suburbs and rural settlements. Other places where fflecsi has also replaced many routes may have their service area split into service zones based on corridors of the previous routes or a high demand area, and passengers would be required to switch fflecsi services to exit one service zone and enter another.

Fares and discount eligibility differ for each service area. Prices and routes as of June 2021.

=== Conwy Valley ===
Fflecsi replaced bus routes 68A, 68B, 68C, 68D and 70, and part-replaced route 42 (between Llanrwst and to Cwm Penmachno), previously operated by Llew Jones International, with destinations such as Llanrwst, Betws y Coed, Corwen, Penmachno and Llangernyw. The services are operating in partnership with Alpine Travel of North Wales and Conwy County Borough Council. They operate Monday to Saturday, with extended services to Corwen only operational three times a week. Concession card holders travel for free, and fares are between £1 and £3 for adults. In September 2023, the service was expanded to Dolwyddelan.

=== Pembrokeshire ===
Fflecsi operates a service area in northwest Pembrokeshire; bus routes and service times differ throughout the area and run differently each day. Different villages within the area may be serviced on different days of the week. The services are operating in partnership with Pembrokeshire Voluntary Transport (PVT) and Pembrokeshire County Council, which operate a service area configured roughly like a triangle, with 3 main hubs in the area in each corner.

The hubs are Fishguard, Haverfordwest, and St Davids, which can all be connected with a fflecsi service with each other at varying times. These connections form 3 loose zones of the service area, which all overlap with each other near the centre of the Pembrokeshire service area. Unlike other zones operated by fflecsi, they are named after figures or places according to PVT. The St Brides service zone revolves around connections between St Davids and Haverfordwest, occupying the western half. St Aidan's service zone revolves around connections between St Davids and Fishguard, occupying the northern half. Jemima's service zone revolves around connections between Fishguard and Haverfordwest, occupying the eastern half of the entire service area.

Trips must be pre-booked in advance, and charged £4–£6 for adults, with discounts using MyTravelPass and free services for Welsh concession card holders are available.

In July 2023, TfW and Pembrokeshire County Council, announced the service would expand to coastal areas of the county, surrounding Tenby, Saundersfoot and inland areas of Pembroke and Pembroke Dock. This would replace the existing 360 and 361 bus routes between Tenby and Pembroke Dock. The fflecsi Dale Peninsula service area would also expand towards Milford Haven, replacing the 308 service connecting Burton, Freystrop, Hook, Llangwm, Merlin's Bridge and Rosemarket.

In October 2023, the Pembrokeshire Poppit Rocket coastal bus service became a fflecsi service, increasing its operating hours from the six summer days and one day in winter, to a Monday-Saturday service year-round. It would cover the area between Fishguard and Cardigan, and as far south as Crymych.

=== Newport ===
At launch in Newport, there are two service zones, 1 and 26, centred on Rogerstone and St Julians respectively. The zones overlap in Newport city centre, and its bus station. Zone 1 replaces routes 1, 1B, 11A and 11C, connecting Rogerstone, Pye Corner, High Cross, Ridgeway and the city centre, while Zone 26 replaces routes 26A and 26C, connecting Old Barn Estate, St Julians, Barnardtown, Beechwood and the city centre.

The two zones operate separately, with specific fflecsi buses only servicing their zones. To move between the two zones, for example from Zone 1 to 26, one has to alight off a route 1 bus and board a route 26 for a destination in Zone 26 from an origin in Zone 1. The services are operating in partnership with Newport Transport (Newport Bus) who provide fares. Season/pre-purchased tickets can be used, and those with a MyTravelpass or a disabled concessionary travel card may be provided a discount.

From Summer 2021, the service in Newport was expanded, with one service zone covering all of Newport. The new service was described to be complementing and enhancing to the existing local bus routes in the city. It operates 7 days a week, with reduced Sunday operating hours.

In September 2021 some new minibuses were taken out of service in Newport due to a manufacturing fault.

In February 2022, there were calls for the service to cover Newport's rural areas, therefore having the service cover all of Newport County Borough.

In August 2022, following the announcing of its terminiation in September, the South Wales Argus reported various concerns their readers had on the service. Some readers criticised the service's booking system, reporting they had difficulties in booking a seat, especially after the service was expanded to more of Newport. Whereas other readers had concerns over potential inefficiency in the service which is taxpayer-subsidised, as well as a case of dropping off a passenger at an incorrect drop-off point. Other readers praised the service, and stated their disappointment that the service would be terminating.

The pilot service ended on 25 September 2022. It was fflecsi's largest pilot service, with all nine vehicles used being removed from service. The pilot was said to have provided data to Newport Bus to improve its scheduled bus services. Some residents were disappointed with the decision. Newport Council made no comment on the decision stating it is a TfW service, although it was stated to be operating "in partnership" with the council. Matthew Evans, leader of the Newport Conservatives, believed the service was permanent and not a pilot scheme. TfW had not announced it was a temporary service when it was expanded in July 2021. TfW stated the pilot "was initially funded for nine months and then extended for a further three to obtain more data", that the purpose of the scheme was to provide information to "plan and improve future public transport routes", and that the data had shown a "very high demand on certain urban routes" which would be more effectively served using traditional fixed bus services.

=== Cardiff North ===
In north Cardiff, fflecsi has replaced the G1 route to provide a G1 service area, covering Coryton, Gwaelod-y-Garth, Llandaff North, Tongwynlais, and Whitchurch, with the University Hospital of Wales and Llandaf railway station being within this area. The services are operating in partnership with NAT Group (Adventure Travel; where fflecsi tickets can be used on their other non-fflecsi routes), charged £2 for a single, and £3 for a return trip.

=== Rhondda ===
In Rhondda, there is a fflecsi 152 service on the former 152 scheduled bus route, covering Hendreforgan, Tonyrefail and Tonypandy. The services are operating in partnership with Stagecoach and Rhondda Cynon Taf County Borough Council.

=== Prestatyn ===
In Prestatyn, fflecsi replaced the 40 bus route, operated by Townlynx. The service area that replaces the route spans most of the Prestatyn area, including Bryn Newydd, Ffrith, and the bordering areas north and west of Meliden and Gronant respectively, though not serving most of Meliden and areas of Gronant in Flintshire.

=== Denbigh ===
Fflecsi operates a service area in Denbigh and Henllan, replacing the 66 bus route. The services are operating in partnership with M&H coaches. The area covers Denbigh Town centre and the B5382 road up to Henllan. The service is charged at £1.50 for a single, and £2.70 for a return trip.

=== Blaenau Gwent ===
On 14 June 2021, fflecsi was introduced to Blaenau Gwent, replacing routes E2 and E4. The service area is split into two zones, 1 and 2. Zone 1 centred on Ebbw Vale and Rassau Industrial Estate. Zone 2 spanning south (mainly along A467) from Brynmawr to Llanhilleth. The two zones border each other at Garnlydan and near Beaufort. The services are operating in partnership with Stagecoach and Blaenau Gwent County Borough Council. Zone 1 also serves Ysbyty Aneurin Bevan and Ysbyty'r Tri Chwm.

In December 2022, the service in Blaenau Gwent was reported to increase passenger numbers by 17%, with more than 23,000 trips recorded over six months from June 2022 to December 2022. The service was set to end in June 2023.

=== Flintshire ===
On 21 June 2021, fflecsi expanded its operations to Flintshire, with a service area spanning the area of and around Holywell. The area of this service will enable connections to other bus services in both Holywell and Caerwys for residents (especially rural) who currently lack access to public transport. In addition to allowing passengers to connect to other services, fflecsi's service area in Holywell will include local leisure facilities, retail outlets, schools, and medical centres. The service is operated by P&O Lloyd Coaches.

The fflecsi service replaces the bus routes LT1, LT2, and LT3, is charged at £2.50 for adults, £1.50 for children, with concessionary cards providing free travel, and discounts for those with a young person's mytravelpass.

On 5 July 2021, the operations of the service were increased to provide a six-day service for the area.

On 27 May 2022, Holywell's service area was announced to be expanded to include Penyffordd, Picton, Gwespyr, Gronant and Gwaenysgor.

Another pilot service in Buckley would be operational from 15 August 2022. Partnering with operator Prestige Taxis, the area will cover Buckley, Higher Kinnerton, Penyffordd and Hope, allowing for residents without a current public transport connection to connect to scheduled bus services in Buckley and Broughton.

=== Llŷn Peninsula ===
In July 2021, fflecsi started operations in the Llŷn Peninsula in Gwynedd. Operating as 'O Ddrws i Ddrws fflecsi', it replaced the service that only operated along the coast. The new service only runs on weekdays, and serves an area that includes Aberdaron, Abersoch, Nefyn, Pwllheli, and Trefor, with connections to beaches, camping sites, and other tourist attractions. The service returned for summer 2023.

=== West Wales ===
On 27 September 2021, it was announced that fflecsi would start operating the 12-year operating Bwcabus service in West Wales, as two separate services both branded as "fflecsi Bwcabus", a rural North Carmarthenshire/South Ceredigion service and a Pembrokeshire service, in partnership with Carmarthenshire, Pembrokeshire, and Ceredigion County Councils. The service area includes: Llandysul, Lampeter and Newcastle Emlyn for the Carmarthenshire/Ceredigion service, and Llanglydwen, Maenclochog and Puncheston for the Pembrokeshire service. The pre-existing service would become available on fflecsi's app and website, but will use a different telephone number. In July 2023, the service was announced to expand to Crymych, Clynderwen and Llandissilio, although Castlemorris, Hayscastle Cross and Llangloffan would move into the main fflecsi Pembrokeshire service area from the Bwcabus area.

In October 2023, it was announced the Bwcabus service would end on 31 October, after the Welsh Government's Rural Development Programme's funding ended, and the Welsh Government refused to continue funding the service. A petition to retain the service reached more than 800 signatures. Pembrokeshire County Council announced they were able to secure funding for a replacement service provided by Richards Brothers until 31 March 2024. The Bwcabus service was one of Britain's longest-running DRT service, started in 2009 with European Union funding, which was withdrawn following Brexit.

=== Ruthin ===
On 14 March 2022, the service started operating in Ruthin, Denbighshire, with the area spanning the town itself and the surrounding villages of Bontuchel, Clawddnewydd, Clocaenog, Cyffylliog, Derwen, Graigfechan, Llanelidan, Pentrecelyn and Rhydymeudwy. The service uses fflecsi's first zero-emission vehicle, a EVM e-Cityline battery-electric 16-seat minibus, as part of scheme to receive feedback and identify the suitability of electric vehicles for the service. All services are local government-run by Denbighshire County Council, with the electric minibus branded separately as Fflecsi Trydan (Welsh for 'Fflecsi Electric'). The service replaces three existing bus routes, with one fflecsi service operating with defined times in mornings. On launch, introductory fees were used, charged at £1.50 travelling to or from Ruthin and the surrounding villages, and £1 travelling within the town.

The Ruthin fflecsi service was reported to carry more passengers than the pre-existing fixed bus routes did prior to introduction. While the service is used by older people for shopping and socialising, there was a noticeable increase in use of the service by teenagers. The electric minibus service was reported to be cheaper to run compared to diesel-fueled, and the aggregation of rides, the main contributor to general DRT service's success, has performed with little difficulty.

== Fleet ==
Fflecsi uses either minibuses, or buses provided by operators. Nine branded minibuses were used in Newport for the operation of the whole Newport fflecsi service. An electric minibus is in operation in Ruthin, Denbighshire, purchased by the Welsh Government Energy Service.
