= Aberbargoed Hospital =

- Aneurin Bevan University Health Board
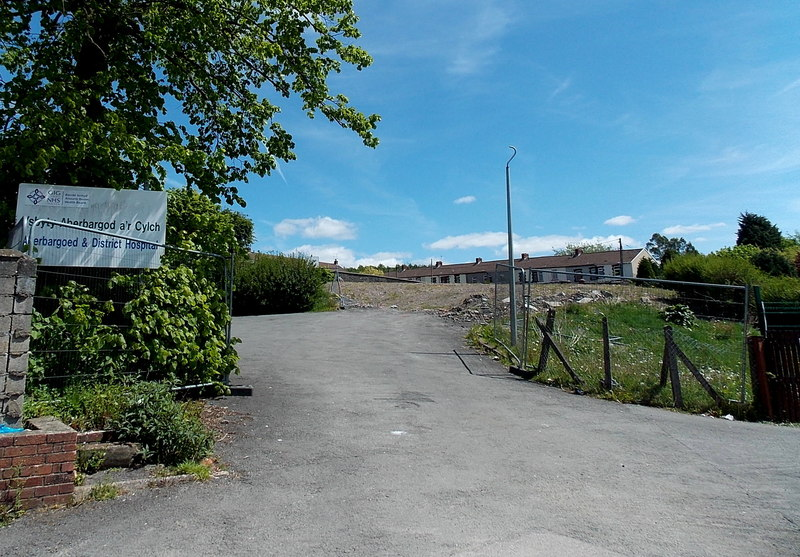
- Site of the demolished hospital

- Shown in Caerphilly County Borough

Geography
- Location: Aberbargoed, Wales, United Kingdom
- Coordinates: 51°41′37″N 3°13′22″W

Organisation
- Care system: Public NHS
- Type: Community Hospital

Services
- Beds: 22

History
- Founded: 10 December 1909
- Closed: November 2010

Links
- Lists: Hospitals in Wales

Aberbargoed Hospital (Welsh: Ysbyty Aberbargoed) was a community hospital in Aberbargoed, Caerphilly County Borough, Wales. It was managed by the Aneurin Bevan University Health Board.

== History ==
The hospital was commissioned by the Powell Duffryn Steam Coal Company to provide hospital facilities for their employees in the Rhymney Valley. The 14 bed-facility was opened by Viscount Tredegar on 10 December 1909. The hospital was subsequently maintained by the men themselves, who made contributions towards its upkeep.

After services were temporarily transferred Caerphilly District Miners Hospital, Aberbargoed Hospital closed in November 2010. The closure anticipated the opening of the new Ysbyty Ystrad Fawr facility at Ystrad Mynach which became the permanent acute facility in the area in March 2012. The hospital was subsequently demolished and the site was redeveloped for residential use in 2015.
