= Ysbyty =

Ysbyty may refer to:

== Places in Wales ==
- Ysbyty Ifan, village and community in the Conwy County Borough
- Ysbyty Ystwyth, village in Ceredigion

== Hospitals ==
- Ysbyty Aneurin Bevan
- Ysbyty Ystrad Fawr
