= Blaina & District Hospital =

Blaina and District Hospital
- Aneurin Bevan University Health Board
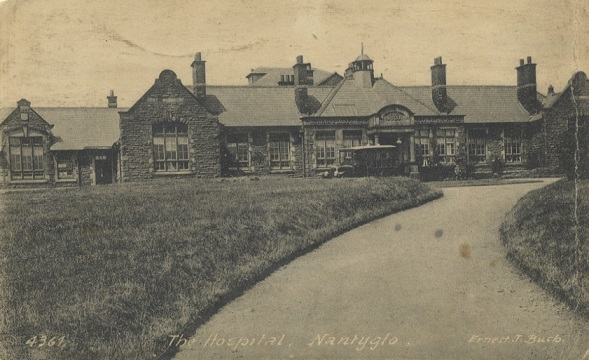
- Nantyglo Hospital

- Shown in Blaenau Gwent

Geography
- Location: Nantyglo, Wales, United Kingdom
- Coordinates: 51.781373°N 3.165224°W

Organisation
- Care system: Public NHS
- Type: Community Hospital

Services
- Emergency department: No Accident & Emergency

History
- Founded: 1910
- Closed: October 2010

Links
- Lists: Hospitals in Wales

Blaina and District Hospital (Welsh: Ysbyty Blaina a'r Cylch) was a community hospital in Blaina, Blaenau Gwent, Wales. It was managed by the Aneurin Bevan University Health Board.

== History ==
The site for the hospital was acquired from Octavius Price. The hospital was designed by Gasenius Lewis and built by W A Linton. The hospital, which was paid for from subscriptions by local mining communities, opened as the Nantyglo Hospital on 2 January 1911. The maternity ward was officially opened by the Duke and Duchess of York on 17 March 1932. The hospital joined the National Health Service as the Blaina and District Hospital in 1948.

After services transferred to the Ysbyty Aneurin Bevan in Ebbw Vale it closed in 2010. The building was subsequently demolished and the site cleared.
