= County Hospital, Torfaen =

County Hospital
- Aneurin Bevan University Health Board
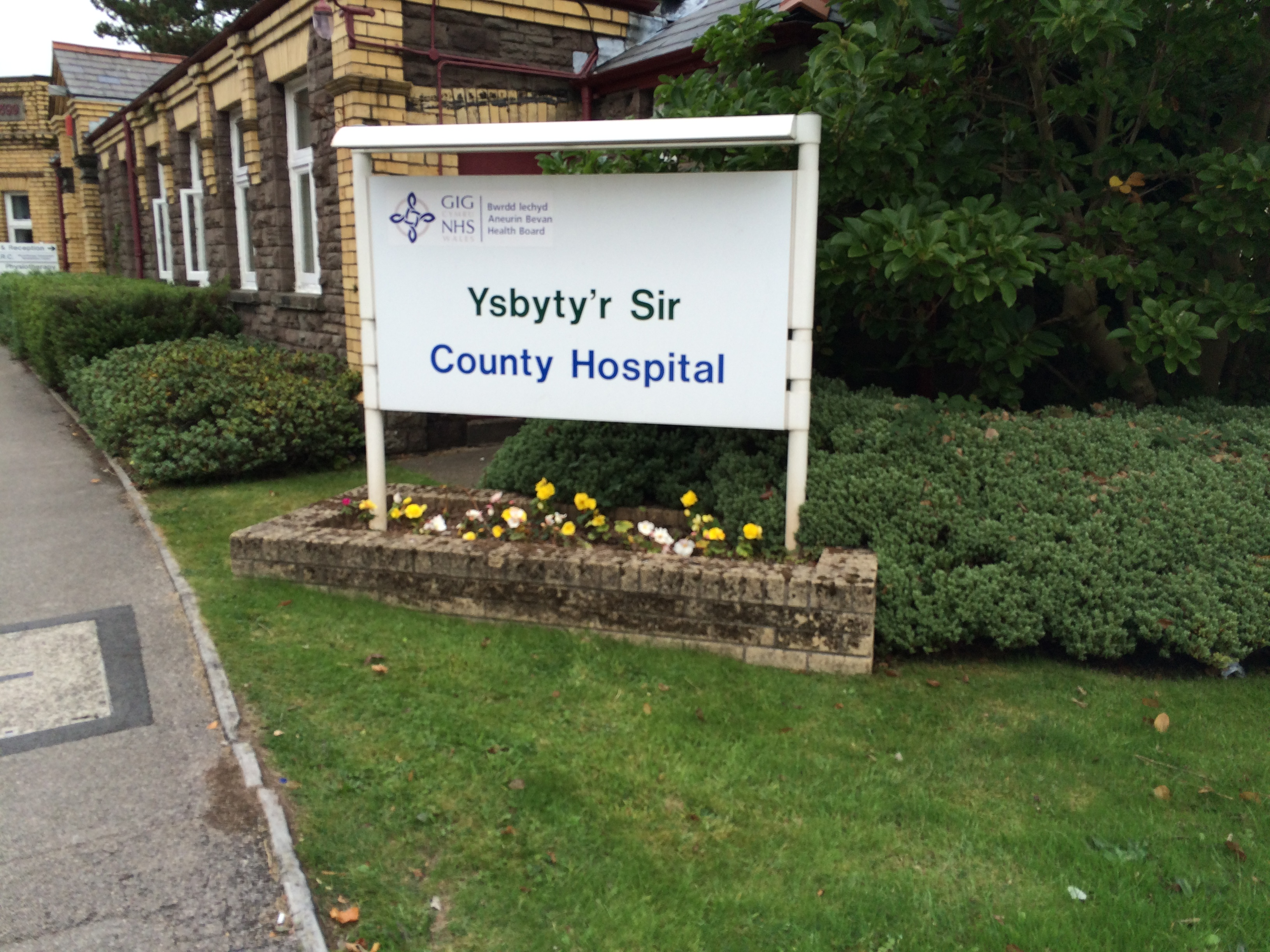
- County Hospital south entrance, Coed-y-Gric Road

- Shown in Torfaen County Borough

Geography
- Location: Griffithstown, Torfaen County Borough, Wales, United Kingdom
- Coordinates: 51.690137°N 3.025591°W

Organisation
- Care system: Public NHS
- Type: General Hospital

Services
- Emergency department: No Accident & Emergency

History
- Founded: 1837

Links
- Website: abuhb.nhs.wales/healthcare-services/community-services/community-hospitals-and-facilities/county-hospital/
- Lists: Hospitals in Wales

County Hospital (Welsh: Ysbyty'r Sir) is a community hospital in Griffithstown in the county borough of Torfaen, Wales. It is managed by the Aneurin Bevan University Health Board.

== History ==
The hospital has its origins in the Pontypool Union Workhouse and Infirmary established in 1837. A new infirmary was built to the north of the workhouse in 1895. It subsequently became known as Panteg County Hospital. The minor injuries unit closed in November 2011.

== Services ==
County Hospital is a community hospital providing a range of inpatient and outpatient services. It does not have a minor injuries or Accident & Emergency department.

The hospital receives patients from the Royal Gwent Hospital and Nevill Hall Hospital for rehabilitation after strokes or orthopaedic surgery or for convalescence after other procedures. County hospital also houses patients awaiting placement into nursing or residential care homes.

The purpose built osteoporosis unit (DXA) covering the ABUHB area was opened in 2010 and a bone fracture liaison clinic opened in July 2015 as an extension of the DXA service.
