= Elizabeth Harcourt Mitchell =

British writer (1833–1910)

Elizabeth Harcourt Mitchell (15 December 1833 – 16 September 1910) was a British writer whose writing included poetry, novels, and for the periodical press. Her work was praised, including after her death.

== Personal life ==
Her married home, Llanfrechfa Grange, Monmouthshire

Mitchell was born in Montagu Square, London, on 15 December 1833, to John Etherington Welch Rolls and his wife Elizabeth Mary Long. Her brother John Rolls became Baron Llangattock and a nephew, Charles Stewart Rolls, was co-founder of Rolls-Royce.

Her family was known for including wealthy amateur authors. She wrote songs for her father to sing, and she composed prologues for his private plays. Mitchell travelled to France, Spain, Portugal, Holland, and more as a passenger of her father's yacht. She learned how to paint landscapes and architecture. Mitchell was part of the Society of Lady Artists.

She married Frank Johnstone Mitchell in 1860, and they had two daughters. They lived at Llanfrechfa Grange near Cwmbran; the house is now a hospital. Her husband was Sheriff of Monmouthshire in 1868.

Mitchell was a devout Anglican and member of the Anglo-Catholic English Church Union. The Mitchells restored All Saints' Church, Llanfrechfa, and founded St Mary's Church, Croesyceiliog, in 1903. She was upset when women were banned from joining church councils. Women were excluded despite outnumbering male churchgoers in London in any religious denomination. She tried to stop women from being excluded, but she was unable to do so.

She was a supporter of women's suffrage in the United Kingdom and a member of the Women's Social and Political Union and its predecessors.

== Career ==
Mitchell's writing included poetry, novels, and for the periodical press. Her fiction was often religious. Her first work was a volume of poems titled First Fruits. She wrote A Short Church History which was used as a textbook for pupil teachers.

The Times said that her book The Beautiful Face has a "strong infusion of religious teaching" and "is a good bit of work in its particular class." In a review of Wild Thyme: Verses, The Athenaeum said "Mrs. Mitchell is more shallow and finical than Gerda Fay; but her versification is correct, and she also thinks like a clever, pious woman." Bookseller and the Stationery Trades' Journal wrote that A Diamond Ring: A Tale "is quite equal to her previous works, and will no doubt secure a considerable circle of readers".

== Death ==
She died at Llanfrechfa Grange on 16 September 1910 and most of the parish attended her funeral. Mitchell's obituary in The Illustrated London News described her as "a very accomplished artist" and a "voluminous writer, chiefly on religious subjects".

== See also ==
- Rolls family
