= Oakdale Hospital =

- Aneurin Bevan University Health Board
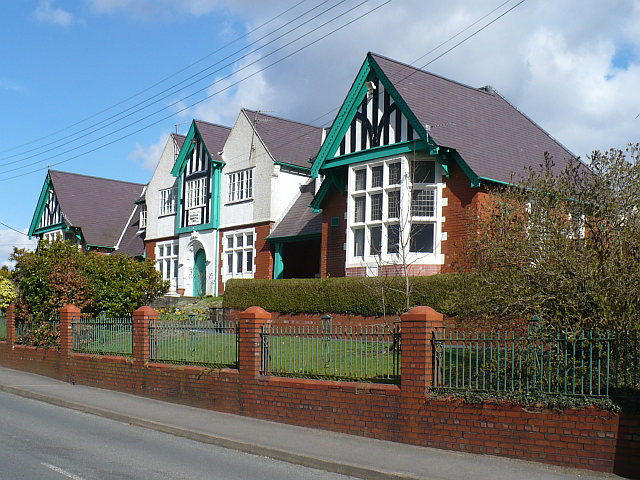
- Oakdale Hospital in 2008

- Shown in Caerphilly County Borough

Geography
- Location: Oakdale, Caerphilly, Wales, United Kingdom
- Coordinates: 51.679998°N 3.180631°W

Organisation
- Care system: Public NHS
- Type: Community Hospital

Services
- Beds: 14

History
- Founded: 1915
- Closed: 2011

Links
- Lists: Hospitals in Wales

Oakdale Hospital (Welsh: Ysbyty Oakdale) was a community hospital in Oakdale, Caerphilly, Wales. It was managed by the Aneurin Bevan University Health Board.

== History ==
The hospital, which formed part of the Oakdale Garden Village built for the workers of the Tredegar Iron and Coal Company, was opened in 1915. It provided 14 beds primarily for patients waiting to be discharged home. After services transferred to the new Ysbyty Ystrad Fawr at Ystrad Mynach, Oakdale Hospital closed in 2011. It is now a private house known as "Ty Webb".
