= County Hospital =

County Hospital may refer to:

- County Hospital, Torfaen, Wales
- County Hospital, Durham, England
- County Hospital, Stafford, England
- County Hospital (film), a 1932 Laurel and Hardy short film
- County Hospital, Ghana
