= Victoria Hospital, Richmond =

Hospital in North Yorkshire, England

Victoria Hospital
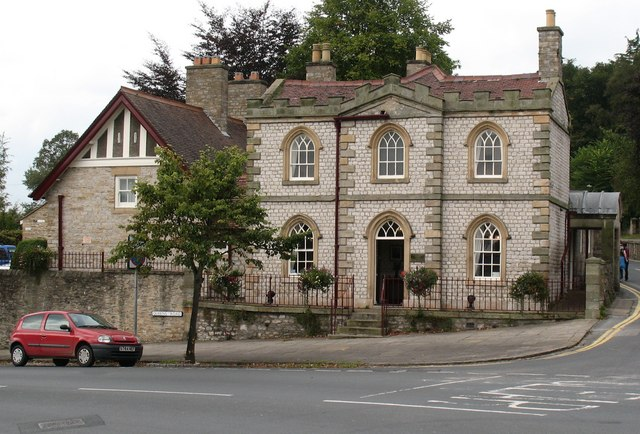
- Victoria Hospital

- Shown in North Yorkshire

Geography
- Location: Queen's Road, Richmond, North Yorkshire, England
- Coordinates: 54.4062°N 1.7364°W

Organisation
- Care system: NHS

Services
- Emergency department: No

History
- Founded: 1899
- Closed: 1999

Links
- Lists: Hospitals in England

The Victoria Hospital was a health facility in Queen's Road, Richmond, North Yorkshire, England. It is now used as a funeral director's offices and remains a Grade II listed building.

== History ==
The facility, which was created by converting an early 19th century neo-gothic style house into a hospital, opened as the Richmond Cottage Hospital in 1899. It joined the National Health Service in 1948. After services were transferred to modern facilities at the Friary Community Hospital in 1999, the Victoria Hospital closed and the building was converted for use as a funeral director's offices.

The building is constructed of stone with quoins, a floor band, an embattled parapet, and a tile roof. There are two storeys and three bays, the middle bay projecting under a pediment. The central doorway and the windows all have pointed heads, Gothic glazing, and hood moulds.

== See also ==
- Listed buildings in Richmond, North Yorkshire (north and outer areas)
