= Friary Community Hospital =

Hospital in North Yorkshire, England

- South Tees Hospitals NHS Foundation Trust
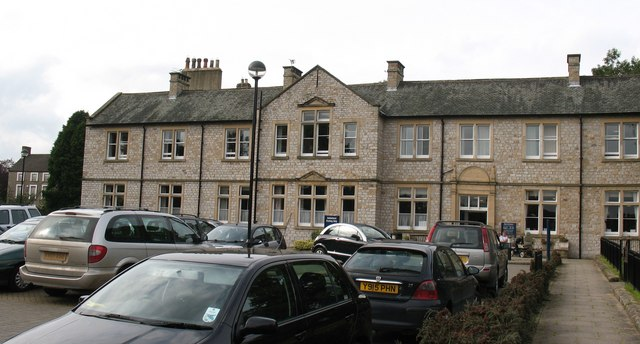
- The main frontage of the Friary Community Hospital

- Shown in North Yorkshire

Geography
- Location: Queen's Road, Richmond, North Yorkshire, England
- Coordinates: 54.4051°N 1.7386°W

Organisation
- Care system: NHS
- Type: Community hospital

Services
- Emergency department: No

History
- Founded: 1999

Links
- Lists: Hospitals in England

The Friary Community Hospital is a health facility in Queen's Road, Richmond, North Yorkshire, England. It is managed by South Tees Hospitals NHS Foundation Trust. The main frontage, facing east, is 19th century, while the adjacent block, facing south, is 18th century and is a Grade II listed building.

== History ==
The facility was commissioned to replace the aging Victoria Hospital. The site for the new hospital lies within the grounds of a 13th century Franciscan friary. The scheme was procured under a private finance initiative contract in 1997 and was implemented by converting a large traditional property (previously used as the headmaster's house for Richmond School) into a community hospital; it was officially opened in 1999. Concerns were raised in the local newspaper over the future of the hospital in October 2018 after staff at the GP's surgery within the hospital were told that their lease would not be renewed.
