= Ystrad Mynach Hospital =

- Aneurin Bevan Local Health Board
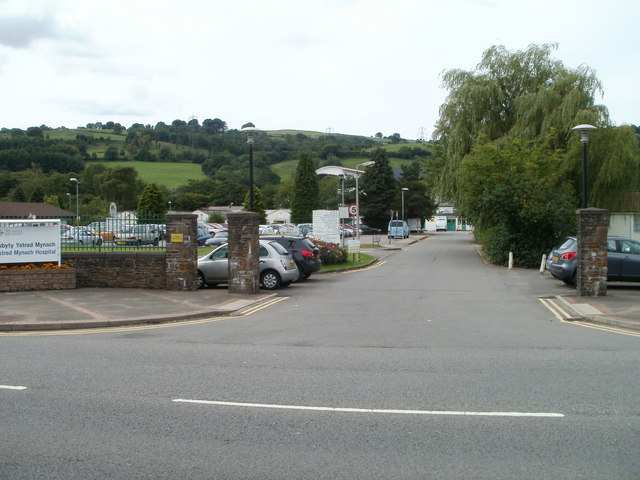
- Ystrad Mynach Hospital

- Shown in Caerphilly County Borough

Geography
- Location: Ystrad Mynach, Wales, United Kingdom
- Coordinates: 51.634°N 3.237°W

Organisation
- Care system: Public NHS
- Type: Cottage Hospital

History
- Founded: 1950s
- Closed: 2011

Links
- Lists: Hospitals in Wales

Ystrad Mynach Hospital (Welsh: Ysbyty Ystrad Mynach) was a community hospital in Ystrad Mynach, Wales. It was managed by Aneurin Bevan Local Health Board.

== History ==
The hospital was established by converting a war-time miners' hostel located on the western side of the Caerphilly Road in the early 1950s. After services transferred to the new Ysbyty Ystrad Fawr, which had been built on the eastern side of the Caerphilly Road facing the old hospital, Ystrad Mynach Hospital closed in 2011. The old hospital was subsequently demolished and the site redeveloped for use as a sports centre.
