= Royal Gwent Hospital =

- Aneurin Bevan University Health Board
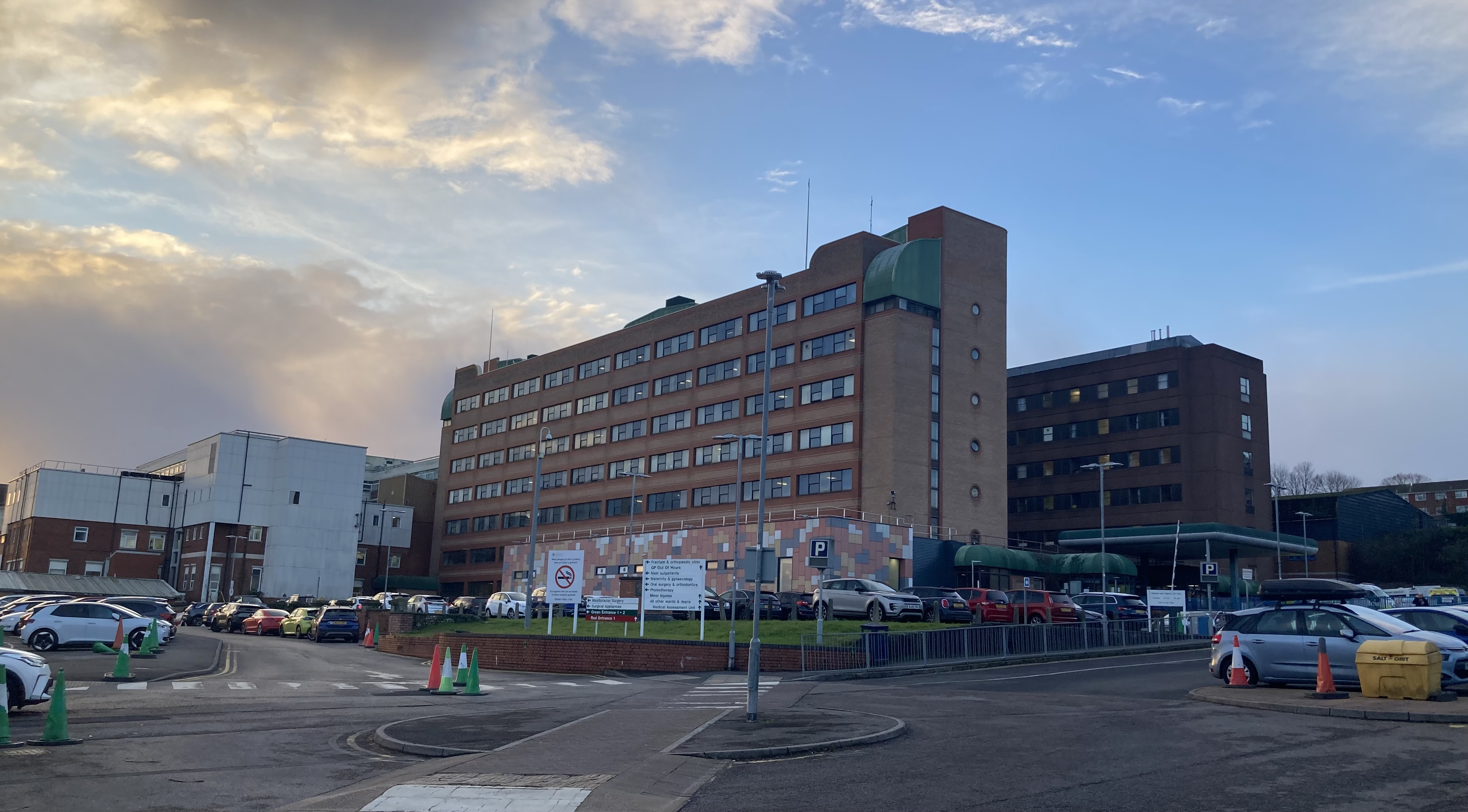
- Cardiff Road entrance of the hospital in 2026

- Shown in Newport

Geography
- Location: Cardiff Road, Newport, Wales, United Kingdom
- Coordinates: 51.580°N 2.998°W

Organisation
- Care system: NHS Wales
- Type: General

Services
- Emergency department: Minor Injury Unit only - not a full Emergency Department

History
- Founded: 1836, moved 1901

Links
- Website: abuhb.nhs.wales/hospitals/our-hospitals/royal-gwent-hospital/

The Royal Gwent Hospital (Welsh: Ysbyty Brenhinol Gwent) is a local general hospital in the city of Newport. It is managed by the Aneurin Bevan University Health Board. Since 2020, the hospital no longer has a full Emergency Department, and redirects those with a serious illness or injury to call 999 or go to attend the Grange University Hospital in Cwmbran. The Royal Gwent hospital has a 24-hour Minor Injuries Unit.

== History ==
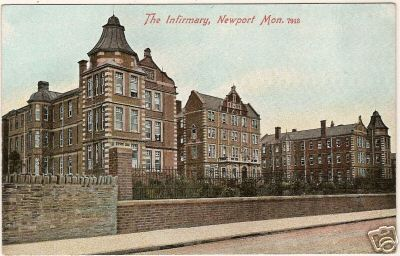
Newport and Monmouthshire Hospital new buildings in 1905

The hospital has its origins in the Newport Dispensary which was founded in Llanarth Street in 1839 and received its first-in-patients as the Newport Dispensary and Infirmary in 1867.

It moved to a site in Cardiff Road donated by Viscount Tredegar in the early 20th century: it was officially opened there by Viscount Tredegar as the Newport and Monmouthshire Hospital in August 1901. It changed its name to the Royal Gwent Hospital in 1913.

The hospital joined the National Health Service in 1948: it was then completely reconstructed to create modern facilities in the early 1960s.

During the COVID-19 pandemic, it was reported that around half of A&E medical staff had tested positive for coronavirus.

== See also ==
- St Woolos Hospital
