= Ebbw Vale Hospital =

- Aneurin Bevan University Health Board
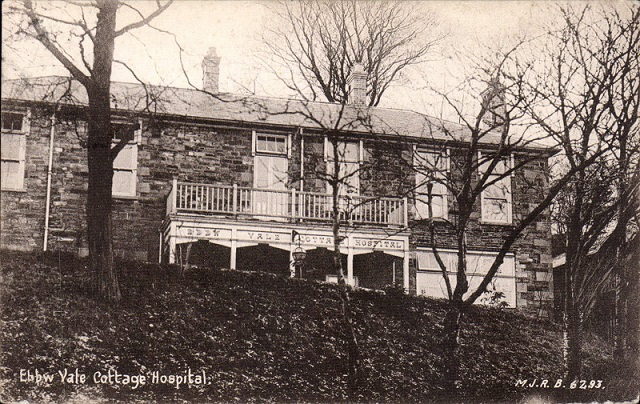
- Ebbw Vale Hospital

- Shown in Blaenau Gwent

Geography
- Location: Ebbw Vale, Wales, United Kingdom
- Coordinates: 51.7752°N 3.2114°W

Organisation
- Care system: Public NHS
- Type: Community Hospital

History
- Founded: 1900
- Closed: 2005

Links
- Lists: Hospitals in Wales

Ebbw Vale Hospital (Welsh: Ysbyty Ebbw Vale) was a community hospital in Ebbw Vale, Wales. It was managed by the Aneurin Bevan University Health Board.

== History ==
The hospital was established by the conversion of two houses (one belonging to the Ebbw Vale Steelworks manager and one belonging to the Steelworks surgeon) in 1900. It joined the National Health Service in 1948 and, following the successful development of community-based health services, closed as a public sector healthcare institution in 2005. It briefly reopened as a private hospital in April 2008, but after Ysbyty Aneurin Bevan became the main provider of healthcare in the area in October 2010, the hospital got into financial difficulties and ceased trading in May 2012.
