= Abertillery and District Hospital =

- Aneurin Bevan University Health Board
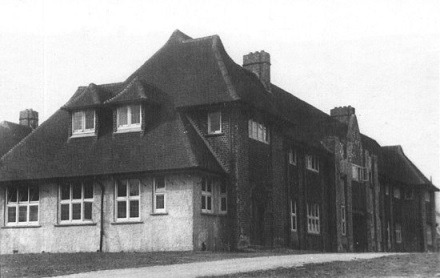
- Abertillery and District Hospital

- Shown in Blaenau Gwent County Borough

Geography
- Location: Aberbeeg, Abertillery, Blaenau Gwent County Borough, Wales, United Kingdom
- Coordinates: 51°42′31″N 3°08′56″W

Organisation
- Care system: Public NHS
- Type: Community Hospital

Services
- Emergency department: No Accident & Emergency
- Beds: 52

History
- Founded: 1922
- Closed: 2008

Links
- Lists: Hospitals in Wales

Abertillery and District Hospital (Welsh: Ysbyty Abertyleri a'r Cylch) was a community hospital in Aberbeeg, near Abertillery, in Blaenau Gwent County Borough, Wales. It was managed by the Aneurin Bevan University Health Board. It is a Grade II listed building.

== History ==
The site for the hospital was acquired from the Hanbury Estate. A foundation stone was laid on behalf of the directors of the Powell Duffryn Steam Coal Company and the Lancaster Steam Coal Company, another on behalf of their workers and a third stone on behalf of the people of Abertillery on 25 September 1920. The hospital was designed by Walter Prosser and built by John Henry Monks. It opened on 30 September 1922. It joined the National Health Service in 1948.

The hospital closed in 2008 and was subsequently acquired by the St Luke's Hospital Group who continue to operate it as a mental health facility.

== In popular culture ==
The hospital was used for scenes in the Doctor Who episode "The Eleventh Hour" and the film Skellig.
