= Caerphilly District Miners Hospital =

- Aneurin Bevan University Health Board
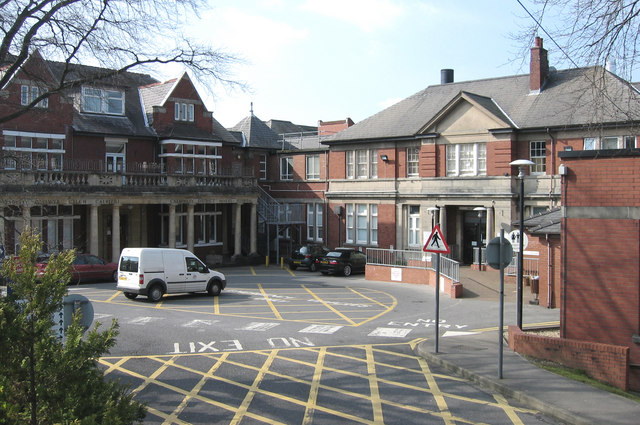
- The Miners' Hospital before closure in 2011

- Shown in Caerphilly County Borough

Geography
- Location: Caerphilly, Caerphilly County Borough, Wales, United Kingdom
- Coordinates: 51.56933°N 3.23217°W

Organisation
- Care system: Public NHS
- Type: Community Hospital

Services
- Emergency department: No Accident & Emergency

History
- Founded: 1923
- Closed: 2011

Links
- Lists: Hospitals in Wales

Caerphilly District Miners’ Hospital (Welsh: Ysbyty'r Glowyr Caerffili) was a community hospital in Caerphilly, Wales which was commissioned to provide healthcare to the miners, who worked in the local pits, and their families. It closed and was converted to a community centre in 2011.

== History ==
The hospital was established in a private house known as "The Beeches" which was acquired from Frederick Piggott, a mining contractor. It was commissioned to provide healthcare to the miners, who worked in the local pits, and their families. Miners paid weekly subscriptions of 2.5 pence to the hospital to raise the £30,000 needed. The hospital received its first patient on 2 July 1923. In the 1940s the hospital broadened its services to the whole community rather than just miners and their families. In 1945 the Hospital Board acquired Redbrook House, another large property, and converted it into a nurses' home. The hospital joined the National Health Service in 1948.

It had a consultant-led birth centre which was, despite protests, changed to a midwife-led birth centre. The location of the hospital meant it was only able to treat part of the local population, preventing the full integration of services.

The Welsh Government approved changes to hospital facilities in March 2000. After services transferred to Ysbyty Ystrad Fawr at Ystrad Mynach, Caerphilly District Miners Hospital closed in November 2011. The site was subsequently redeveloped for housing and the main hospital building converted into a community centre.
