= Aneurin Bevan University Health Board =

NHS local health board in South East Wales

- Bwrdd Iechyd Prifysgol Aneurin Bevan

- Map of service area in Wales
- Type: NHS Wales local health board
- Established: 1 October 2009
- Headquarters: Lodge Road; Caerleon; Newport; NP18 3XQ
- Region served: Blaenau Gwent; Caerphilly; Monmouthshire; Newport; Torfaen; Powys (part)
- Hospitals: Chepstow Community Hospital; County Hospital; Grange University Hospital; Llanfrechfa Grange Hospital; Maindiff Court Hospital; Monnow Vale Integrated Health and Social Care Facility; Nevill Hall Hospital; Royal Gwent Hospital; St Cadoc's Hospital; St Woolos Hospital; Ysbyty Aneurin Bevan; Ysbyty'r Tri Chwm; Ysbyty Ystrad Fawr
- Staff: 11,490 (2018/19)
- Website: abuhb.nhs.wales

Aneurin Bevan University Health Board (ABUHB) (Welsh: Bwrdd Iechyd Prifysgol Aneurin Bevan) is the local health board of NHS Wales for Gwent, in the south-east of Wales. Its headquarters are in Caerleon. In was the first Welsh health board to be fined under the data protection act.

== History ==
the local health board (LHB) was launched in October 2009 through the merger of Gwent Healthcare NHS Trust and Blaenau Gwent, Caerphilly, Newport, Torfaen, and Monmouthshire LHBs. It is named after Aneurin Bevan, a Member of Parliament who represented the area and who was the Minister of Health responsible for the foundation of the National Health Service.

Aneurin Bevan University Health Board is the operational name of Aneurin Bevan Local Health Board.

== Remit ==
The Board's total catchment area for health care services contains a population of about 600,000. Acute, intermediate, primary and community care and mental health services are all provided across a network of primary-care practices, community clinics, health centres, one learning disability hospital, a number of community hospitals, mental health facilities, one local general hospital and three district general hospitals – Royal Gwent, Nevill Hall and Ysbyty Ystrad Fawr. In 2010 Ysbyty Aneurin Bevan hospital replaced several small community hospitals in Blaenau Gwent.

The Grange University Hospital is due to open in Llanfrechfa in 2021 but 384 beds were opened in April 2020, a year in advance of schedule, in case they were needed for the COVID-19 pandemic in Wales, enabled by the extensive adoption of offsite fabrication. The hospital opened in full on 17 November 2020.

The plan is to centralise some acute services currently located at the Royal Gwent and Nevill Hall Hospitals.

== Controversies ==
=== RCP Report ===
A report by the Royal College of Physicians (RCP) found that some trainee doctors and consultants at Aneurin Bevan University Health Board felt unsafe at work due to staffing shortages and heavy workloads.

The report described “frightening experiences” faced by staff at the Grange University Hospital. It stated that the hospital was chronically understaffed and that excessive workloads were causing “very serious patient safety concerns”. Some doctors reported being worried that working under these conditions placed their medical licences at risk.

RCP president Andrew Goddard, said that some trainees told the college they were “scared to come to work” in case an incident led to the loss of their General Medical Council registration.

Doctors described patients being repeatedly moved between hospitals for scans and procedures. Some said elderly patients had been transferred multiple times between wards and sites. Others reported treating serious conditions in facilities designed only for minor injuries.

The university's doctors claimed that they repeatedly escalated concerns to the health board's management but that these concerns went ignored.

One consultant stated that about 60 doctors wrote to the chief executive but believed their concerns were not addressed.

=== Data Breach ===
In 2012, the board became the first NHS body in Wales to be fined for breaching the Data Protection Act for sending a patient's information to the wrong individual. The Information Commissioner’s Office (ICO) investigated the incident and imposed a £70,000 fine.

The breach occurred when a consultant emailed a medical report to a secretary without providing enough details the identify the patient and misspelled the patient’s name. Subsequently, the report was sent to a former patient with a similar name. The document contained explicit information relating to the patient’s health.

The investigation found that neither the consultant nor the secretary had received data protection training. The regulator also concluded that the health board lacked adequate checking procedures to ensure that personal information was sent to the correct recipient. The ICO warned that similar practices were used by other clinical and administrative staff within the organisation.

=== Government intervention ===
The Welsh government intervened in 2024 due to the board's dire finances and emergency care performance. The Welsh health secretary Jeremy Miles described the board’s forecast £18.3 million deficit as “not acceptable” and said some emergency services had failed to deliver required improvements. The intervention was intended to improve the quality and timeliness of urgent and emergency care in Wales' Gwent region.

== Hospitals ==
Current

- Chepstow Community Hospital, Chepstow
- County Hospital, Torfaen
- Grange University Hospital, Cwmbran
- Llanfrechfa Grange Hospital, Cwmbran
- Maindiff Court Hospital, Abergavenny
- Monnow Vale Integrated Health and Social Care Facility, Monmouth
- Nevill Hall Hospital, Abergavenny
- Royal Gwent Hospital, Newport
- St Cadoc's Hospital, Caerleon, Newport
- St Woolos Hospital, Newport
- Ysbyty Aneurin Bevan, Blaenau Gwent
- Ysbyty'r Tri Chwm, Ebbw Vale
- Ysbyty Ystrad Fawr, Ystrad Mynach

Former

- Aberbargoed Hospital, Aberbargoed (closed 2010)
- Abertillery and District Hospital, Abertillery (closed 2008)
- Blaenavon Hospital, Blaenavon (closed 2014)
- Blaina & District Hospital, Blaina (closed 2010)
- Caerphilly District Miners Hospital, Caerphilly (closed 2011)
- Cottage Hospital, Monmouth (closed 2006)
- Oakdale Hospital, Oakdale (closed 2011)
- Redwood Memorial Hospital, Rhymney (closed 2013)
- Tredegar General Hospital, Tredegar (closed 2010)
- Ystrad Mynach Hospital, Ystrad Mynach (closed 2011)
