= Ysbyty Ystrad Fawr =

- Aneurin Bevan University Health Board
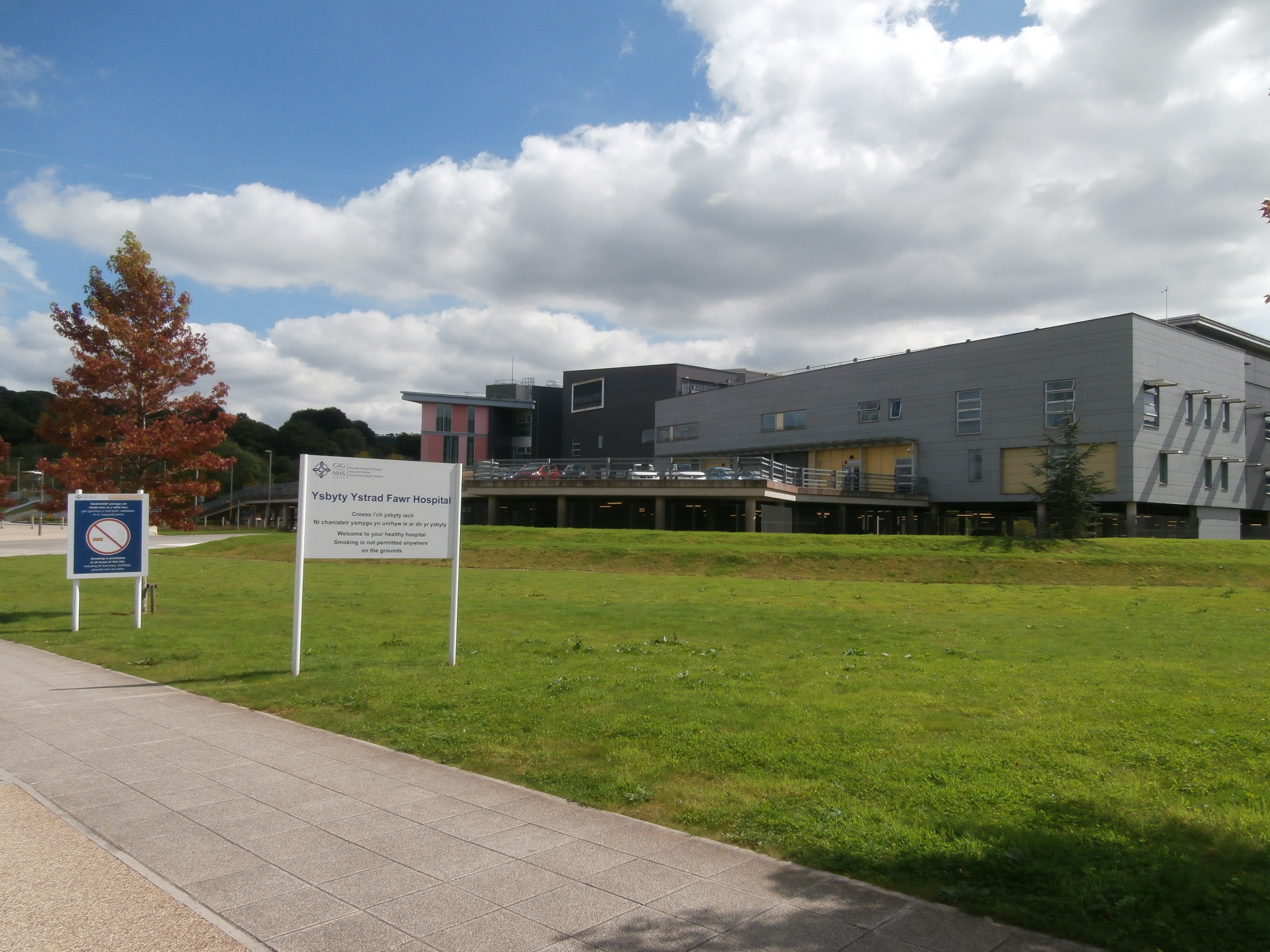
- Ysbyty Ystrad Fawr

- Shown in Caerphilly County Borough

Geography
- Location: Ystrad Mynach, Caerphilly County Borough, Wales, United Kingdom
- Coordinates: 51.633725°N 3.233398°W

Organisation
- Care system: Public NHS
- Type: General Hospital

Services
- Emergency department: Minor Injuries Unit
- Beds: 269

History
- Founded: 2012

Links
- Website: abuhb.nhs.wales/healthcare-services/enhanced-local-general-hospitals/ysbyty-ystrad-fawr/
- Lists: Hospitals in Wales

Ysbyty Ystrad Fawr (English: Large Vale Hospital) is a community hospital at Ystrad Mynach in Caerphilly County Borough in Wales. Opened in 2011 and officially inaugurated in 2012, it was built to centralise and modernise healthcare services in the region, replacing several older local hospitals. The £172 million facility is managed by the Aneurin Bevan University Health Board and features 269 single ensuite rooms, offering a broad range of inpatient and outpatient services, emergency care, and specialist units.

== History ==
Ysbyty Ystrad Fawr was developed as a Local General Hospital to serve the Caerphilly County Borough in Wales, replacing the facilities Aberbargoed Hospital, Caerphilly District Miners Hospital, Oakdale Hospital, and Ystrad Mynach Hospital. The name Ysbyty Ystrad Fawr translates from Welsh into English as "Large Vale Hospital".

Ysbyty Ystrad Fawr was designed to expand local access to healthcare services by significantly increasing outpatient services, emergency and urgent assessment capacity, and offering comprehensive diagnostics, surgery, rehabilitation, maternity, and mental health care. A key target was to ensure that around 90% of patients could be treated locally, reducing the need for travel. The hospital also introduced 24-hour minor injuries care and new services such as hydrotherapy and a Midwifery Led Birthing Unit. Its modern design with all single-patient rooms, integrated mental health services, and evidence-based architectural features was intended to improve patient privacy, infection control, and overall quality of care. Despite its central location, some residents in outlying areas of the borough continue to access services at neighbouring hospitals due to geographical convenience.

Ysbyty Ystrad Fawr was officially opened in March 2012 by Welsh Minister for Health and Social Services Lesley Griffiths, who called it a model for the future of NHS care in Wales. The £172 million facility, which began receiving patients in November 2011, features 269 ensuite single rooms to support infection control and patient privacy.

== Services ==
Ysbyty Ystrad Fawr has 269 beds in single ensuite bedrooms for medical surgical and palliative patients and also has a minor injuries unit.

Ysbyty Ystrad Fawr is managed by the Aneurin Bevan University Health Board, which is responsible for National Health Service in Caerphilly, as well as Blaenau Gwent, Monmouthshire, Newport, and Torfaen.
