= Monnow Vale Integrated Health and Social Care Facility =

- Aneurin Bevan University Health Board
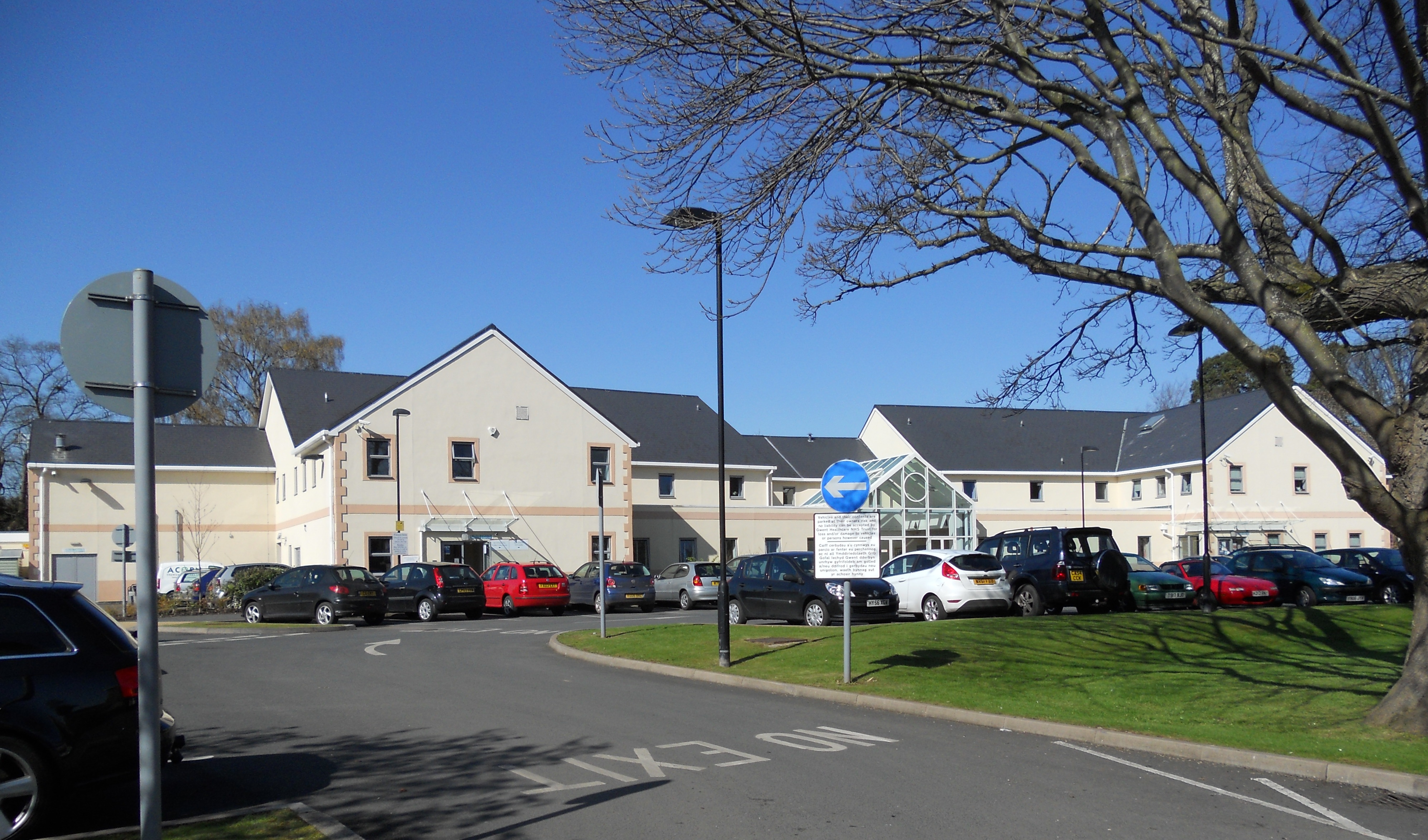
- Monnow Vale Hospital

- Shown in Monmouthshire

Geography
- Location: Monmouth, Wales
- Coordinates: 51.81016°N 2.725056°W

Organisation
- Care system: NHS

Services
- Beds: 19

History
- Founded: 2006

Links
- Lists: Hospitals in Wales

Monnow Vale Integrated Health and Social Care Facility (Welsh: Dyffryn Mynwy Iechyd Integredig a Cyfleuster Gofal Cymdeithasol) is a hospital at Drybridge Park in Monmouth, Wales. It is managed by the Aneurin Bevan University Health Board.

== History ==
The facility was commissioned to replace services previously provided at the Cottage Hospital, Overmonnow Day Hospital and Dixton Road Clinic, along with the social care and community nursing teams. The new facility, which was developed in partnership with Monmouthshire County Council, local Voluntary Organisations, Gwent Healthcare NHS Trust and Monmouthshire Local Health Board, was procured under a Private finance initiative contract in 2003. The facility, which was built by Amec at a cost of £6 million was opened by Dr Brian Gibbons, Minister for Health and Social Services on 20 July 2006. The minor injuries unit closed in November 2011.

== Services ==
The facility has 19 in-patient beds. Specialist services include a cardiology outpatient clinic, a continence clinic, X-ray facilities, a diabetes clinic and retinopathy screening, a GP counselling service, a health visitor clinic, a mental health outpatient clinic for adults, a paediatric audiology clinic, an orthopaedic clinic, an ophthalmology clinic, a pharmacist's clinic, an adult out-patient psychology clinic, a physiotherapy clinic, a podiatry clinic and podiatry consultant clinic, a respiratory clinic, a rheumatology clinic, a sexual health clinic and a spinal injuries clinic.
