= Blaenavon Hospital =

- Aneurin Bevan University Health Board
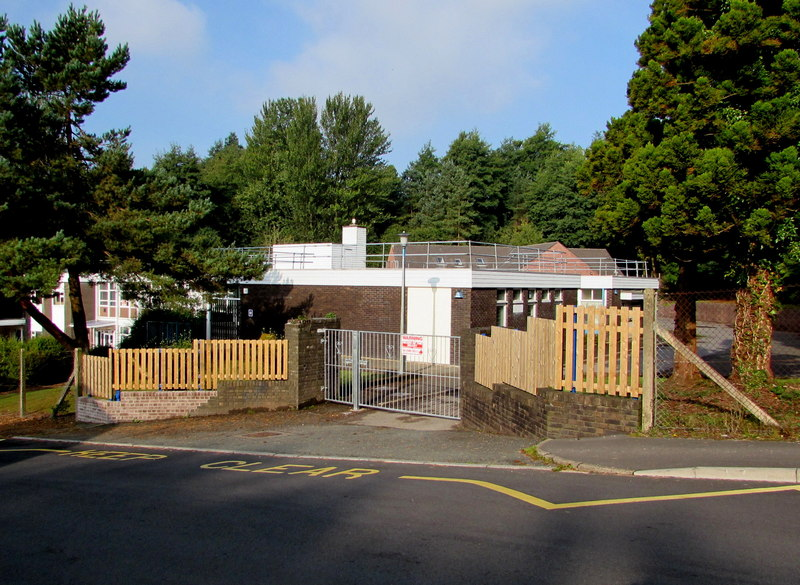
- Blaenavon Hospital

- Shown in Torfaen

Geography
- Location: Blaenavon, Torfaen County Borough, Wales, United Kingdom
- Coordinates: 51.7747°N 3.0908°W

Organisation
- Care system: Public NHS
- Type: Community

Services
- Beds: 9

History
- Founded: 1924
- Closed: 2014

Links
- Website: www.wales.nhs.uk/sitesplus/866/home
- Lists: Hospitals in Wales

Blaenavon Hospital (Welsh: Ysbyty Blaenafon) was a small community hospital located in Blaenavon, Wales. It was managed by the Aneurin Bevan University Health Board.

== History ==
In 1924, Ty Mawr, a house on the eastern side of Church Road, originally built for Sam Hopkins, ironmaster of Blaenavon Ironworks, was converted into a hospital.

A new purpose-built hospital was built on the western side of Church Road in 1985 and Ty Mawr became a nursing home known as The Beaches. The beds in the new hospital were closed to in-patients in October 2010 and, after primary care services were transferred to the new Blaenavon Resource Centre on Middle Coed Cae Road, it closed completely in autumn 2014.
