= St Cadoc's Hospital =

Saint Cadoc's Hospital
- Aneurin Bevan University Health Board
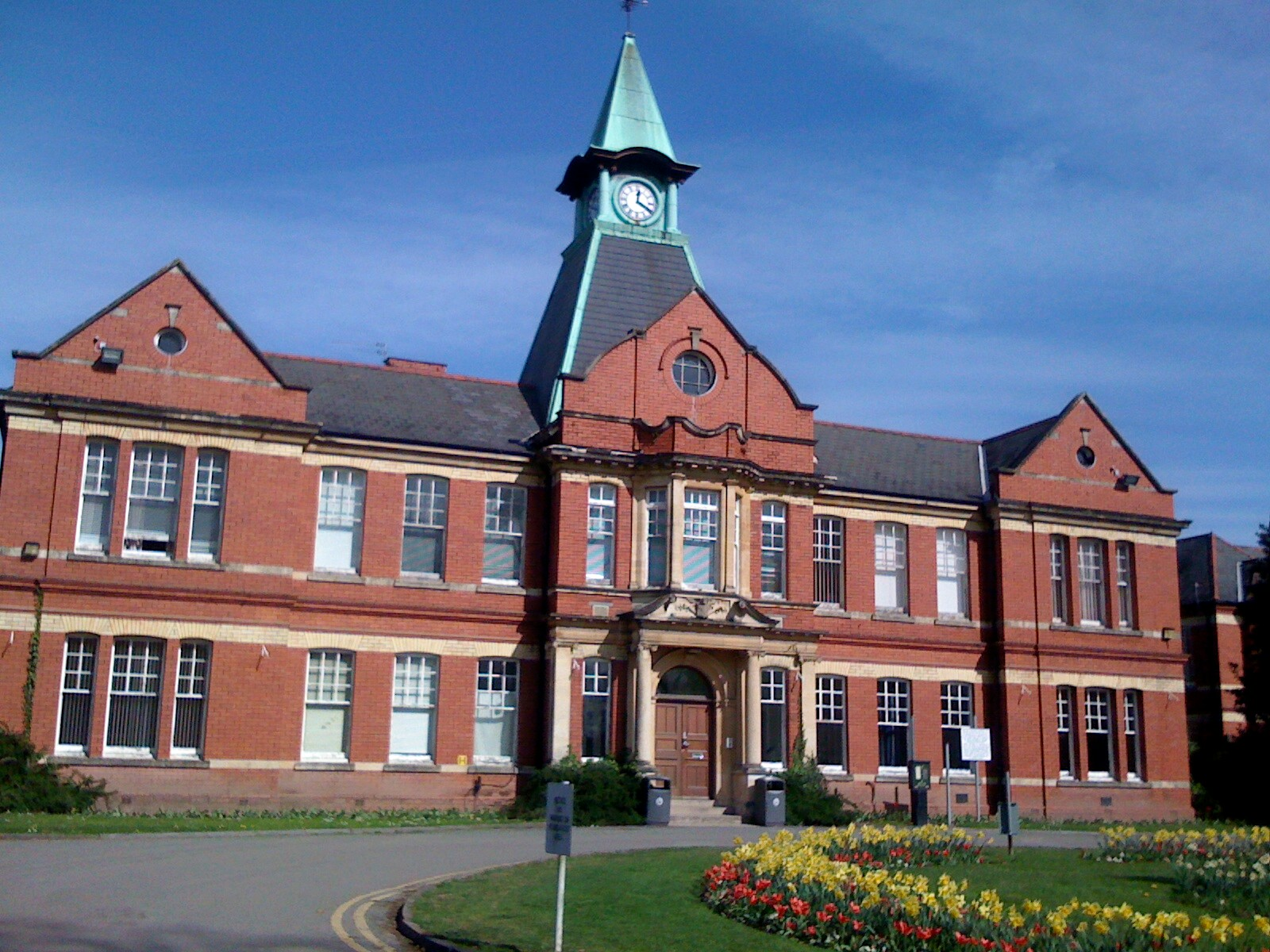
- St Cadoc's Hospital, Caerleon, 2011

- Shown in Newport

Geography
- Location: Caerleon, Newport, Wales, United Kingdom
- Coordinates: 51.6139°N 2.9627°W

Organisation
- Care system: Public NHS
- Type: Mental Health

Services
- Emergency department: No Accident & Emergency

History
- Founded: 1906

Links
- Website: abuhb.nhs.wales/healthcare-services/community-services/community-hospitals-and-facilities/st-cadocs-hospital/
- Lists: Hospitals in Wales

Saint Cadoc's Hospital (Welsh: Ysbyty Sant Cadog) is a mental health facility located in Caerleon on the northern outskirts of the city of Newport, Wales. It is managed by the Aneurin Bevan University Health Board.

== History ==
The foundation stone for the hospital was laid in May 1903. It was designed by Alfred J. Wood using a compact arrow layout and was opened as the Newport Borough Asylum in January 1906. It became Newport County Borough Mental Hospital in 1919 and St. Cadoc's Emergency Hospital during the Second World War. It took its name from Saint Cadoc, patron saint of the local church. It joined the National Health Service as St Cadoc's Hospital in 1948. A new admission unit and outpatient clinic was completed in 1961.

== In popular culture ==
St Cadoc's Hospital has been featured as a location of episodes in the BBC television programmes Doctor Who and Torchwood.
