= Maindiff Court Hospital =

- Aneurin Bevan University Health Board
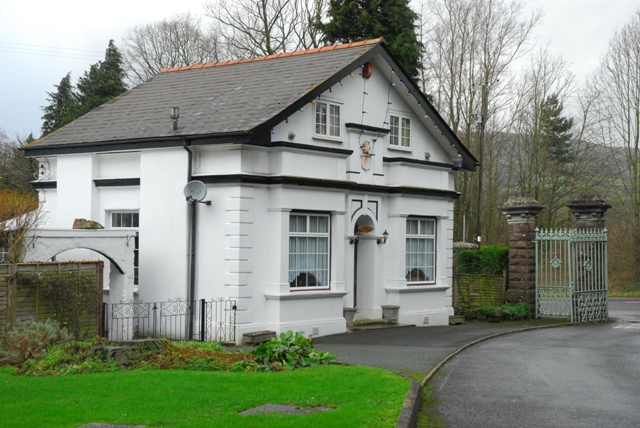
- Southern entrance lodge

- Shown in Monmouthshire

Geography
- Location: Abergavenny, Monmouthshire, Wales, United Kingdom
- Coordinates: 51.833218°N 2.994851°W

Organisation
- Care system: Public NHS
- Type: Community Hospital

Services
- Emergency department: No Accident & Emergency

History
- Founded: 1924

Links
- Website: www.wales.nhs.uk/sitesplus/866/page/40501
- Lists: Hospitals in Wales

Maindiff Court Hospital (Welsh: Ysbyty Maindiff Court) is a community hospital near Abergavenny, Monmouthshire. It is managed by the Aneurin Bevan University Health Board. Its most noted patient was Rudolf Hess, deputy to Adolf Hitler.

== History ==
The hospital is built on the site of Maindiff Court, a mansion house built by Crawshay Bailey Jnr in 1875. After Bailey's death the estate was sold and in 1924 the estate was presented to Monmouthshire Asylum Committee becoming Maindiff Court Hospital. Maindiff Court was demolished and the neo-Georgian style brick hospital buildings were constructed in its place in the 1930s.

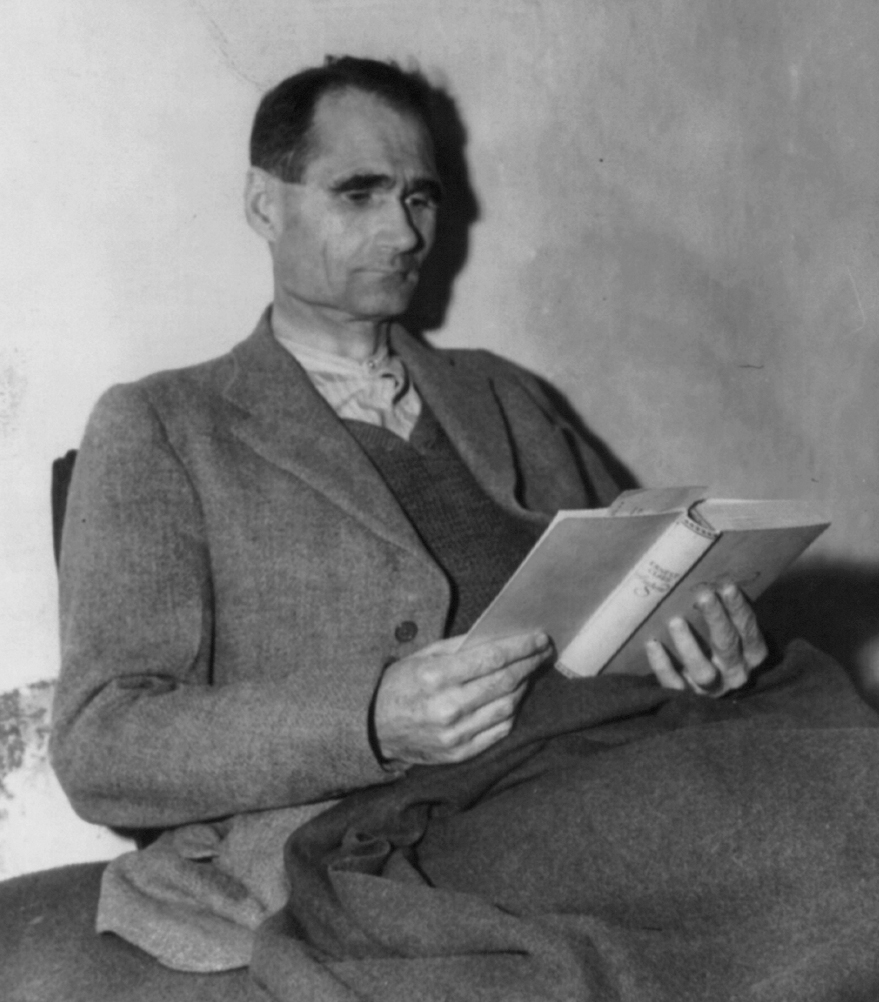
Hess in his cell at Landsberg Prison awaiting trial at Nuremberg in 1945/6

During the Second World War, the facility was known as Maindiff Court Military Hospital and POW Reception Centre. Half of the site was used for recuperating wounded soldiers.

Rudolf Hess, Hitler's deputy, was held at Maindiff Court from 26 June 1942. Hess had his own room but he was guarded at all times. He was allowed a fair degree of freedom, often being driven about the local countryside, such as the local landmark, the Skirrid mountain. The British government never tried to hide the fact that Hess was being detained in Abergavenny. Indeed, when he first arrived, the staff of the hospital lined up in a formal reception to meet him. The news featured in many of the national papers of the time. According to the Daily Mirror at the time, Hess was known locally as the "Kaiser of Abergavenny".

== Services ==
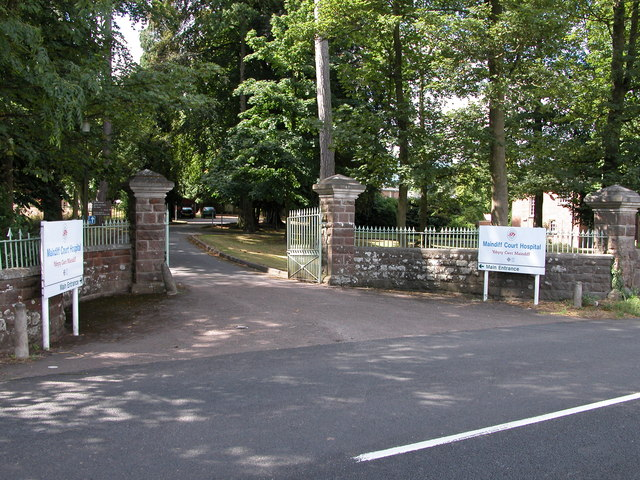
Hospital entrance.

Maindiff Court today comprises four wards, a day hospital and an ECT Department which lie within beautifully kept grounds. The original balustrade can be seen leading down to the day hospital. Ty Skirrid, a 12-bedded ward for the Gwent-wide forensic rehabilitation service, caters for men and women who have a mental disorder and have offended or are at risk of offending and provides on-going psychiatric treatment. Lindisfarne, a 3-bedded un-staffed unit, is overseen by staff from Ty Skirrid and provides unsupervised semi-independent living prior to discharge. Hiraeth Day Hospital provides 12 places a day for 5 days a week for the Abergavenny and rural communities. The ECT department provides electroconvulsive therapy treatment facilities. The Gwent Specialist Substance Misuse Service has its North Team base on site and the North Monmouthshire Adult Community Mental Health Team also provide a service from this site.
