= 2353 (Ystrad Mynach) Squadron ATC =

2353(Ystrad Mynach)Squadron ATC
- Active: 4 September 1960–Present
- Country: United Kingdom
- Branch: Royal Air Force, Air Training Corps
- Type: Volunteer Youth Organisation
- Patron: vacant
- Motto: Nulli Secundus (Second to None)
- Website: https://www.raf.mod.uk/aircadets/find-a-squadron/wales-west/no-1-welsh-wing-hq/2353-ystrad-mynach/

Commanders
- Honorary Air Commodore-In-Chief: The Princess of Wales
- Commandant Air Cadets: Air Commodore Dawn McCafferty

Aircraft flown
- Trainer: Grob Tutor and Grob Viking

2353 Squadron ATC is a squadron in the Air Training Corps based in Cascade, Hengoed, Wales, UK. The squadron is part of No. 1 Welsh Wing ATC in the Wales and West region of the ATC. The squadron was founded on 4 September 1960.

== Activities ==
Members of 2353 Squadron can enjoy all of the activities on offer from the ATC such flying, shooting and completing the Duke of Edinburgh's Award.

=== Flying ===
Cadets at 2353 Sqn are able to have Air Experience Flights with 1 AEF in MOD St. Athen in the Grob Tutor Aircraft. These flights usually last for 30 minutes and give the cadets an opportunity to experience flying. Cadets are also able to complete a range of gliding and flying awards from a pilot navigation scheme to pilot and gliding scholarships.

=== Shooting ===
Cadets have opportunities to fire the L144 A1, L98A2 GP Rifle, the L81A2, air rifles, along with 12 and 20 gauge shotgun during clay pigeon shooting. They will also be able to achieve marksmanship badges from "trained shot" to "competition Marksman" as well as competing in shooting competitions such as CISSAM or ISCRM.

=== Fieldcraft ===
Fieldcraft activities are also run by both the squadron and wing, these include lessons on camouflage and concealment, patrolling and how to cook ration packs. Cadets can further develop these skills and take part in the Air Cadet Junior Leaders course which, if completed, will earn them the maroon lanyard and JL DZ flash. Cadets can also take part in exercises such as Exercise Cambrian Patrol.

=== Annual Camps ===
During the Easter and Summer holidays the wing will run annual camps for the cadets and staff, these tend to take place on active Royal Air Force bases and last for a week. The participants are able to take part in several of the core activities of the Air Training Corps such as shooting and flying, plus as talks from members of the regular forces and visits to local museums and monuments.

== Structure ==
The squadron is run by an officer who is a member of the Royal Air Force Volunteer Reserve (Training Branch); the unit also consists of a group of adult SNCOs and civilian instructors who are charged with the care of the cadets and running of the squadron.

The cadets themselves also progress through a rank structure based on that of the RAF. The Cadet Non-commissioned officers are tasked with helping develop new cadets and carrying out tasks delegated to them by the adult staff.

== Parade nights ==
2353 Squadron parades on Monday and Wednesday nights which, usually, begin with a parade, the purpose of which is to raise the ensign of the Air Training Corps and brief the cadets on the activities of that night. These activities, ranging from lessons in uniform preparation, principles of flight or fieldcraft to leadership exercises or sports, will then be led by either an adult member of staff or a senior cadet. At the end of the parade night cadets and staff will have a final parade where upcoming activities are discussed before the cadets are dismissed.
