= Chepstow Community Hospital =

- Aneurin Bevan University Health Board
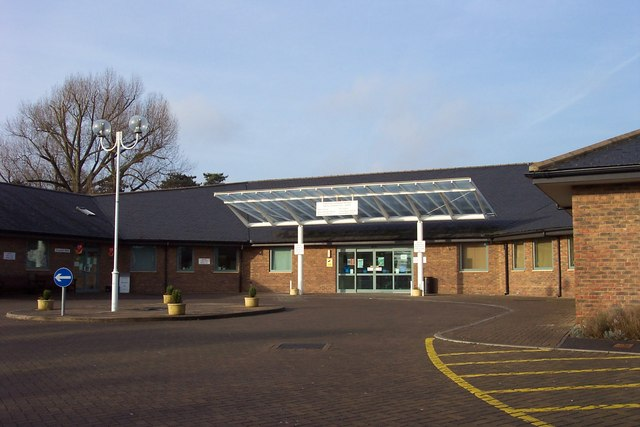
- Entrance to Chepstow Community Hospital

- Shown in Monmouthshire

Geography
- Location: Chepstow, Monmouthshire, Wales
- Coordinates: 51°38′23″N 2°41′05″W

Organisation
- Care system: NHS
- Type: Community hospital

History
- Founded: 2000

Links
- Website: www.wales.nhs.uk/sitesplus/866/page/40469
- Lists: Hospitals in Wales

Chepstow Community Hospital (Welsh: Ysbyty Cymunedol Cas-gwent) is a community hospital located on the east side of St Lawrence Road in Chepstow, Monmouthshire, Wales. It is managed by the Aneurin Bevan University Health Board.

== History ==
The site selected had previously been occupied by Mount Pleasant Hospital, a facility which had been built by the Admiralty for workers at the National Shipyard in Chepstow in 1917. It was used by ex-servicemen more generally from 1919, and later by the community as a whole. The new community hospital incorporates the old Admiralty portico moulding from the front façade of the old hospital. St Lawrence Hospital, an old hospital specialising in burns, had been located on the western side of St Lawrence Road.

The new 87-bed hospital was procured under a Private Finance Initiative in 1997. It was built by Skanska at a cost of £10 million, accepted its first patients in February 2000 and was officially opened by Rt Hon Rhodri Morgan AM MP, the First Minister of Wales in October 2000.

The minor injuries unit closed in November 2011. In March 2013 a local councillor raised concerns that the hospital was just becoming a "glorified health centre".
