= Redwood Memorial Hospital =

- Aneurin Bevan University Health Board
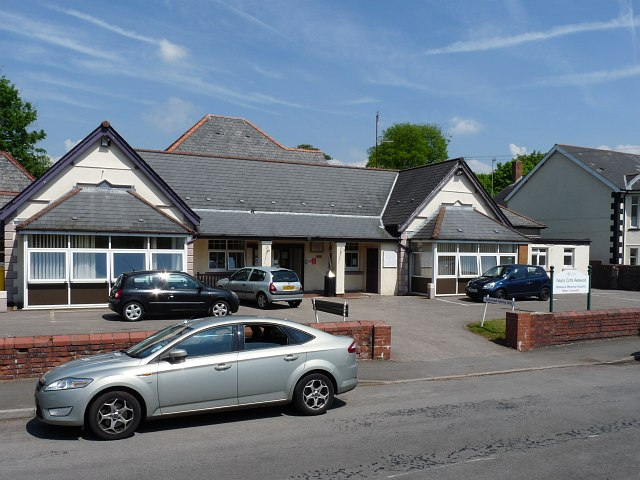
- Redwood Memorial Hospital

- Shown in Caerphilly County Borough

Geography
- Location: Rhymney, Caerphilly County Borough, Wales, United Kingdom
- Coordinates: 51.760226°N 3.288816°W

Organisation
- Care system: Public NHS
- Type: Community Hospital

Services
- Emergency department: Minor Injury Unit
- Beds: 21

History
- Founded: 1904
- Closed: July 2013

Links
- Lists: Hospitals in Wales

Redwood Memorial Hospital (Welsh: Ysbyty Coffa Redwood) was a community hospital in Rhymney, Wales, managed by the Aneurin Bevan University Health Board. It closed in July 2013, and services are now offered through the Rhymney Integrated Health & Social Care Centre.

== History ==
The hospital was commissioned by the Rhymney Workmen's Medical Aid Fund, which was supported by contributions from workmen, each man donating six pennies in the pound from his wages. Established to combat the high rates of mortality and injury in the area, it opened in 1904. The closure of several pits in the area during the 1920s had a severe effect on the local community. The hospital was renamed in honour of Dr de Action Redwood, who was the surgeon there for 43 years, in 1947. It closed in July 2013, and services are now offered through the Rhymney Integrated Health & Social Care Centre.
