= Nevill Hall Hospital =

Hospital in Abergavenny, Wales

- Aneurin Bevan University Health Board
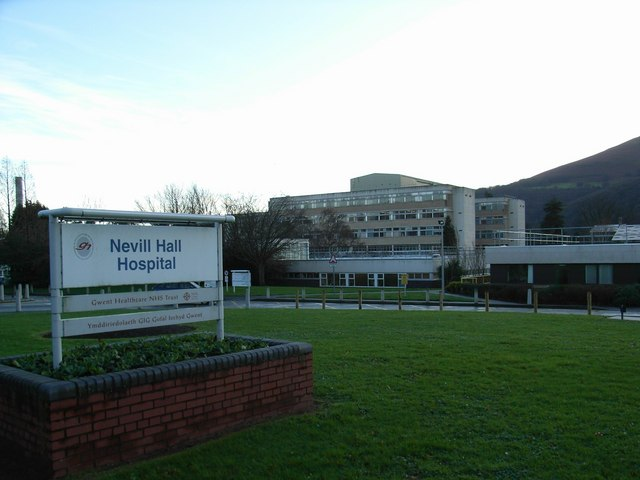
- Nevill Hall Hospital

- Shown in Monmouthshire

Geography
- Location: Abergavenny, Monmouthshire, Wales, United Kingdom
- Coordinates: 51.8239°N 3.0342°W

Organisation
- Care system: Public NHS
- Type: General

Services
- Emergency department: 24 hour, Minor Injury Unit

History
- Founded: 1970

Links
- Website: www.wales.nhs.uk/sitesplus/866/page/40458
- Lists: Hospitals in Wales

Nevill Hall Hospital (Welsh: Ysbyty Nevill Hall) is a district general hospital in Abergavenny, north Monmouthshire, Wales. It is managed by the Aneurin Bevan University Health Board.

== History ==
The site was originally occupied by The Brooks, a country house built for James Charles Hill of Blaenavon Ironworks in the 1860s. It was renamed Nevill Hall, in recognition of his own family name, when it was acquired by the Marquess of Abergavenny in 1890. After the Marquess died in 1915, it had two further owners before being sold to the local hospital board for use as a convalescent facility in 1920.

By the late 1960s the hospital needed modernising and the current facility was opened in 1970. A new education centre was officially opened by Jane Hutt AM in May 2002.

The Accident & Emergency Department at Nevill Hall was closed in November 2020, with services being transferred to the newly opened Grange University Hospital in Cwmbran.
