= Llanfrechfa Grange Hospital =

- Aneurin Bevan University Health Board

- Shown in Torfaen

Geography
- Location: Cwmbran, Wales, United Kingdom
- Coordinates: 51°38′42″N 2°59′48″W

Organisation
- Care system: Public NHS
- Type: Specialist

Services
- Emergency department: No Accident & Emergency
- Speciality: Learning disabilities

History
- Founded: 1953

Links
- Website: www.wales.nhs.uk/sitesplus/866/page/40490
- Lists: Hospitals in Wales

Llanfrechfa Grange Hospital (Welsh: Ysbyty Llanfrechfa Grange) is a medical facility providing assessment and treatment services for people with learning disabilities. It is located to the east of Cwmbran on the B4236 road towards Caerleon to the south-east. It is managed by Aneurin Bevan University Health Board. The main building is a Grade II listed building.

== History ==
Entrance to the site

The site was previously occupied by Llanfrechfa Grange, a country house which was built for Charles Prothero in the middle of the 19th century. It was "a large mansion in the Elizabethan style, pleasantly situated in a park of about 30 acres and overlooking the Valley". It passed to Francis Johnstone Mitchell in 1860, the Cleeve family in 1913, Sir John Cecil Davies in 1921, Elsie Louise Llewelyn in 1922 and to a property developer in 1933.

In 1953, Llanfrechfa Grange started providing long term residential accommodation for people with learning disabilities. In the early 1960s it had more than 500 beds, provided in a series of accommodation blocks called villas. Although it still had more than 300 residents in 1983, following the introduction of Care in the Community shortly thereafter, the hospital went into a period of decline and it finally closed to inpatients in 2008. A Learning Disabilities Assessment and Treatment Unit was kept open at the site.

In 2017 work to create and construct Grange University Hospital, a new specialist critical care centre, started on the site.
