= St Woolos Hospital =

- Aneurin Bevan University Health Board
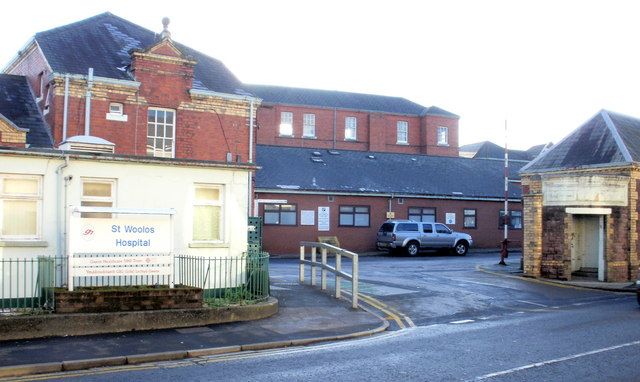
- Hospital entrance

- Shown in Newport

Geography
- Location: Newport, Wales, United Kingdom
- Coordinates: 51°34′55″N 3°00′10″W

Organisation
- Care system: Public NHS
- Type: Specialist

Services
- Emergency department: No Accident & Emergency
- Speciality: Rehabilitation

History
- Founded: 1837 (workhouse infirmary)

Links
- Website: www.wales.nhs.uk/sitesplus/866/page/40500
- Lists: Hospitals in Wales

Saint Woolos Hospital (Welsh: Ysbyty Sant Gwynllyw) is located in the Stow Hill area of Newport, Wales. It is managed by the Aneurin Bevan University Health Board.

== History ==
The site for the hospital was donated by Sir Charles Morgan, 2nd Baronet. The hospital was designed by Thomas Henry Wyatt and was opened as the Newport Union Workhouse and Infirmary in 1837. A new infirmary building was completed in 1869. The workhouse itself was rebuilt in 1903. In 1915 it was agreed that it be converted into a Military Hospital for wounded soldiers, and it came under the control of the 3rd Western General Military Hospital in Cardiff. It joined the National Health Service as St Woolos Hospital, named after Saint Gwynllyw, patron saint of Newport Cathedral, in 1948.

The hospital has a dedicated chest clinic for respiratory outpatients with services provided by both consultants and nurses.

== See also ==
- Newport Cathedral
