= Grange University Hospital =

- Aneurin Bevan Local Health Board
- Grange University Hospital

- Shown in Torfaen

Geography
- Location: Cwmbran, Wales, United Kingdom
- Coordinates: 51.647°N 2.996°W

Organisation
- Care system: Public NHS
- Type: Specialist Critical Care Centre

Services
- Emergency department: Yes - Open 24 hours per day
- Beds: 560

Helipads
- Helipad: Yes

History
- Founded: 17 November 2020

Links
- Website: www.wales.nhs.uk/sitesplus/866/page/61210
- Lists: Hospitals in Wales

Grange University Hospital (Welsh: Ysbyty Athrofaol y Faenor) is a Specialist Critical Care Centre at the site of Llanfrechfa Grange Hospital on the eastern side of Cwmbran. It is managed by Aneurin Bevan University Health Board.

== History ==
The hospital, which was designed by the Building Design Partnership and built by Laing O'Rourke at a cost of £350 million, opened on 17 November 2020. Facilities include 470 beds and a 24-hour emergency department and assessment unit.

Space for 384 beds was opened in April 2020, a year in advance of schedule, in case they were needed for the COVID-19 pandemic in Wales, enabled by the extensive adoption of offsite fabrication. The hospital opened in full on 17 November 2020.
