= Ysbyty Aneurin Bevan =

- Aneurin Bevan University Health Board
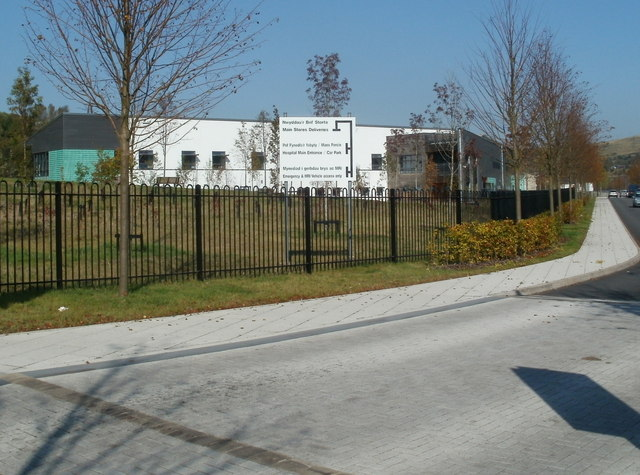
- Ysbyty Aneurin Bevan

- Shown in Blaenau Gwent

Geography
- Location: Ebbw Vale, Wales, United Kingdom
- Coordinates: 51.779°N 3.204°W

Organisation
- Care system: Public NHS
- Type: Local General Hospital

Services
- Emergency department: Minor Injuries Unit
- Beds: 107

History
- Founded: October 2010

Links
- Website: www.wales.nhs.uk/sitesplus/866/page/41413
- Lists: Hospitals in Wales

Ysbyty Aneurin Bevan (Welsh for 'Aneurin Bevan Hospital') is a community hospital in Ebbw Vale, Wales. It is managed by the Aneurin Bevan University Health Board.

== History ==
The hospital was commissioned to replace the aging Ebbw Vale Hospital which had closed at the end of 2005. The new hospital, which was built at a cost of £53 million and stands on the site of the former Ebbw Vale Steelworks, opened in October 2010.

It was the first NHS hospital to be built in England or Wales with 100% single room, ensuite facilities to help control infection and improve privacy. It was named after Aneurin Bevan, the founder of the NHS, and was the first hospital named after him in the UK.

The building sustained "extensive damage" when a 4x4 vehicle was driven through the main entrance in January 2018. An alternative entrance was set up for patients, and a hospital spokesman said it would take six weeks to replace the damaged doors.

== Units ==
The hospital has a minor injuries unit, an outpatients department, outpatients therapy, and an X-ray department. There are four wards: Ebbw Ward, Sirhowy Ward, Tyleri Ward, and Carn-y-Cefn Ward.
