= Ystrad Mynach =

Town in Caerphilly County Borough, Wales

Coordinates: 51.6419°N 3.2405°W

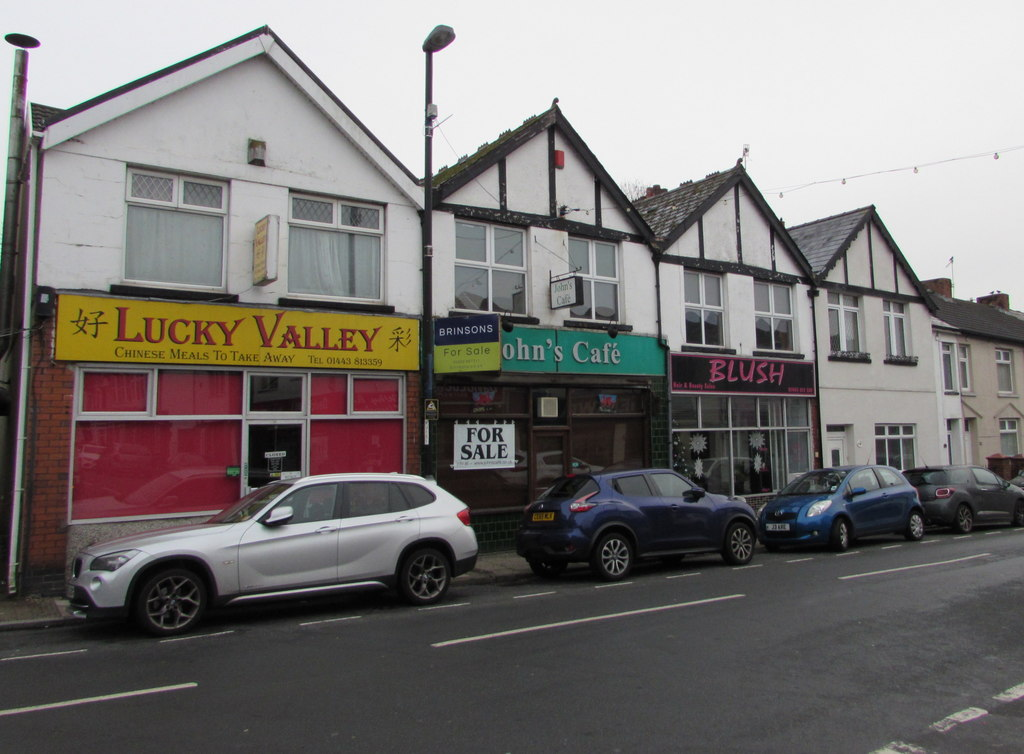
- Commercial Street, Ystrad Mynach

- Location within Caerphilly
- Population: 19,204 (2011 census)
- OS grid reference: ST145945
- Principal area: Caerphilly
- Preserved county: Gwent
- Country: Wales
- Sovereign state: United Kingdom
- Post town: HENGOED
- Postcode district: CF82
- Dialling code: 01443
- Police: Gwent
- Fire: South Wales
- Ambulance: Welsh
- UK Parliament: Caerphilly
- Senedd Cymru – Welsh Parliament: Caerphilly

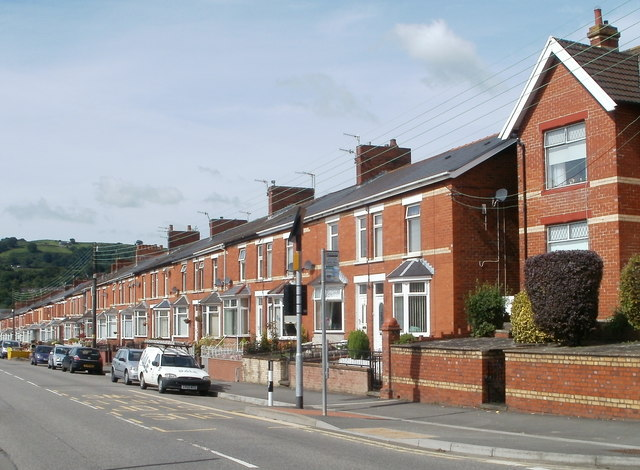
Ystrad Mynach

Ystrad Mynach is a town in the Rhymney Valley in the Caerphilly County Borough, within the ancient county of Glamorgan, Wales, and is 5 miles (8.0 km) north of the town of Caerphilly. The urban area had a population of 19,204 in 2011. Before the Industrial Revolution and the coming of coal mining in the South Wales Coalfield the valley was rural and farmed. It lies in the community of Gelligaer.

== Etymology ==
In the Welsh language, ystrad is a wide flat bottomed valley and mynach means "monk". The form manach is sometimes found in historical records, which Hywel Wyn Owen states is a dialect form of mynach. As there is a lack of evidence for monks settling in the area, the word may have been the name of a tributary of the Rhymney River.

It has been suggested that, rather than referring to a monastic institution, manach is man "place" + -ach, a suffix associated with the names of marshy floodplains, also found in nearby Llanbradach and Llancaiach. Prior to erection of defences on the River Rhymney in the 1960s the town was indeed subject to periodic flooding.

== Amenities and history ==
The town houses a number of council offices, as well as the Ystrad Mynach campus of Coleg y Cymoedd, a further education college established in 1959 to provide training for local coal miners and merged with neighbouring Coleg Morgannwg to form Coleg y Cymoedd in 2013.

The nearby Penallta Colliery was the last coal mine to close in the valley. Other notable buildings and structures are the Ystrad Mynach railway station, the viaduct, a sculpture to commemorate the areas industrial heritage, a community hospital, a number of schools, and the Beech Tree, Coopers Arms and Ye Olde Royal Oak pubs.

From 1927 to 1996, Ystrad Mynach hosted the 'F' division headquarters of Glamorgan Constabulary (from 1968, South Wales Police).

Ystrad Mynach railway station was a location for one of Ronnie Barker's Porridge episodes. Records show that Ystrad Mynach railway station was in existence in 1857, when it was known as Ystrad Junction.

A new Local General Hospital Ysbyty Ystrad Fawr was opened in late 2011. Work started on the Ystrad Fawr site in September 2007. It is located between the A469 Caerphilly to Newbridge Road and the old Caerphilly Road between Ystrad Mynach and Llanbradach. This replaced the services provided by the previous Ystrad Mynach Hospital.

Situated to the north of Ystrad Mynach, is a collection of houses called Tredomen; these houses were built to house the workers of the since-demolished Tredomen Works. They are socially graded houses – ranging from two-up two-down, to a five-bedroom manor in Park Lane with adjoining servants' quarters.

In February 2018 the Beech Tree Fish Bar was severely damaged in a car crash, and the incident made national news. No-one was killed, but three people were taken to hospital. In June 2017 a portion of the town playground was set on fire by an arsonist. In April 2019 13-year-old Carson Price was found unconscious in the playground after he had overdosed with the psychoactive drug ecstasy. He was taken to hospital, but later died.

== Religion ==
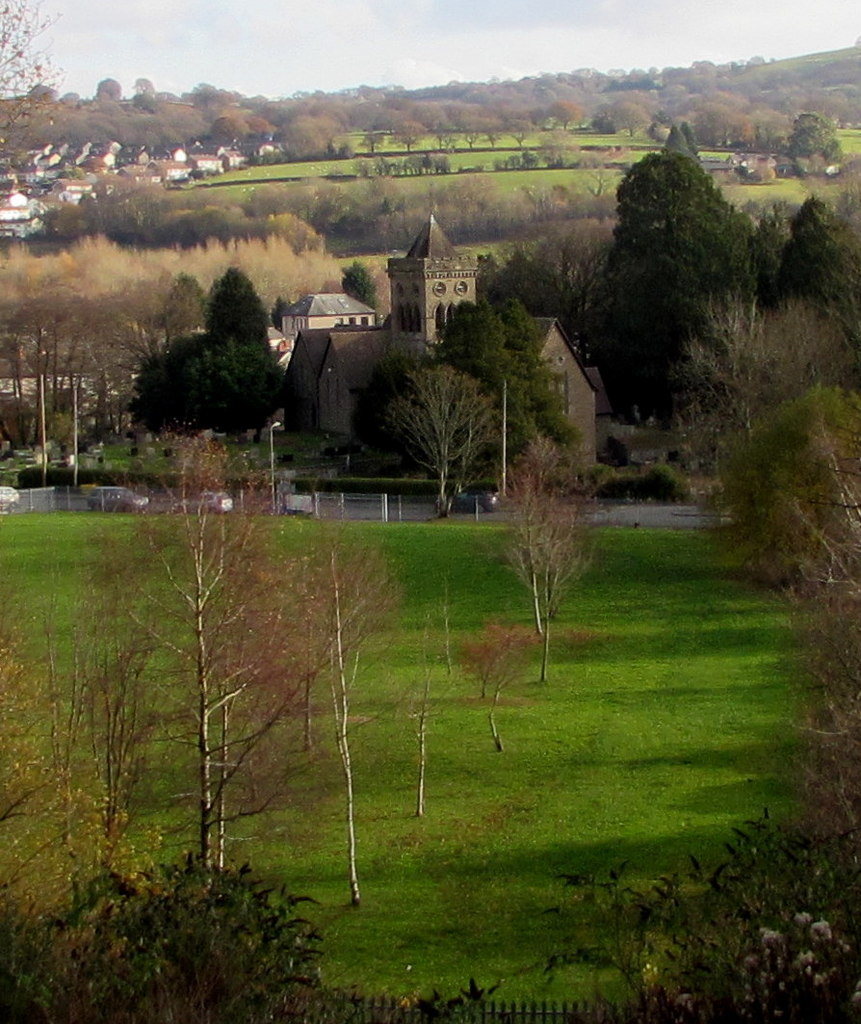
Holy Trinity church

The Anglican parish church for Ystrad Mynach and Llanbradach is Holy Trinity. It is a Grade II listed building, built in 1855–1857, by architect John Norton, for Revd George Thomas whose family were locally important landowners from Llanbradach.

Bryn Seion Welsh Church is a nondenominational church. Situated on Lisburn Road, it was built as a Baptist chapel during the mid-nineteenth century. It contains a mosaic, approximately 6 ft (1.8 m) square, with the name of the chapel, the chapel logo, the year of its construction, 1906 and geometric patterns.

The Methodist Church, on Lewis Street, was enlarged in 2013 to accommodate both worship and community groups. The Siloh Calvinistic Methodist chapel was opened on 10 May 1910, when the town was expanding following the opening of Penallta colliery in 1905–1910.

Bethany United Reformed Church is located on Lisburn Road.

== Governance ==
There are two tiers of local government covering Ystrad Mynach, at community and county borough level: Gelligaer Community Council and Caerphilly County Borough Council. Caerphilly County Borough Council has its main offices at Penallta House in the Tredomen area of Ystrad Mynach.

Ystrad Mynach historically straddled the ancient parishes of Gelligaer and Llanfabon, both of which were in the county of Glamorgan. Much of the boundary between the two parishes was the stream called Nant Caiach (roughly following Nelson Road, the A472), with Gelligaer to the north and Llanfabon to the south. Holy Trinity Church was built in 1855–1856 as a chapel of ease within the parish of Llanfabon. In 1890 Holy Trinity was made the parish church for a new ecclesiastical parish of Ystrad Mynach, covering parts of the civil parishes of Llanfabon and Gelligaer.

For civil purposes, Ystrad Mynach continued to straddle Gelligaer and Llanfabon. Llanfabon was administered as part of Caerphilly from 1893, whilst Gelligaer became an urban district in 1908. Caerphilly Urban District and Gelligaer Urban District were abolished in 1974, with both areas becoming part of Rhymney Valley District, being the first time that a district-level authority had covered all of Ystrad Mynach. Communities were established to replace the old parishes at the same time, with the communities initially using the boundaries of the abolished urban districts, and so Ystrad Mynach straddled the communities of Gelligaer and Caerphilly. The community boundaries were amended in 1985 to put Ystrad Mynach entirely within the community of Gelligaer.

The Office for National Statistics defines Ystrad Mynach as a built-up area sub-division within the wider Newport built-up area. The Ystrad Mynach sub-division covers Ystrad Mynach itself and Gelligaer, Hengoed, Maesycwmmer, and Penpedairheol, and had a population of 19,204 at the 2011 census. For postal purposes, Ystrad Mynach is not considered a post town, but instead comes under the Hengoed post town, CF82. Gelligaer Community Council calls Ystrad Mynach a town, whereas all the other places it covers (including Hengoed) it calls villages.

== Sport ==
Ystrad Mynach Netball Club

Established in 1974, Ystrad Mynach Netball Club caters to members from age 7 and up – running teams in both the junior and senior leagues.

An affiliated member of Wales Netball, it has five competitive teams in the South East Wales Netball Association (SEWNA) League, along with Under 10s, 12s, and 14s in the junior league.

=== Penallta Rugby Football Club ===
Penallta RFC is a rugby union club is based in Ystrad Mynach. The Rugby Club was inaugurated by a group of miners from Penallta colliery in 1952.

It is an affiliated member of the Welsh Rugby Union and plays in the Welsh National League.

Since 2000, Penallta RFC has been one of the most successful rugby clubs in Wales, winning numerous titles at all levels. Penallta won the Worthington Welsh District's Cup at the Millennium Stadium in 2001, the Swalec Plate at the Millennium Stadium in 2012 and the National Plate at the Principality Stadium both in 2017 and 2022.

=== UCY - Union Cycliste Ystrad Mynach ===
UCY - Union Cycliste Ystrad Mynach was founded in May 2013 by Arwel James and Gethin Smallwood. The club caters for male and female cyclists from teenage upwards. As of October 2020, the club has around 100 members.

It is a social cycling club which focuses on local sportives and charity cycling events.

The club has affiliation to Welsh Cycling and British Cycling and regularly receives Sports Wales funding for training equipment and venue hire to encourage off season fitness. Qualified coaches support development and rider safety.

=== Centre for Sporting Excellence ===
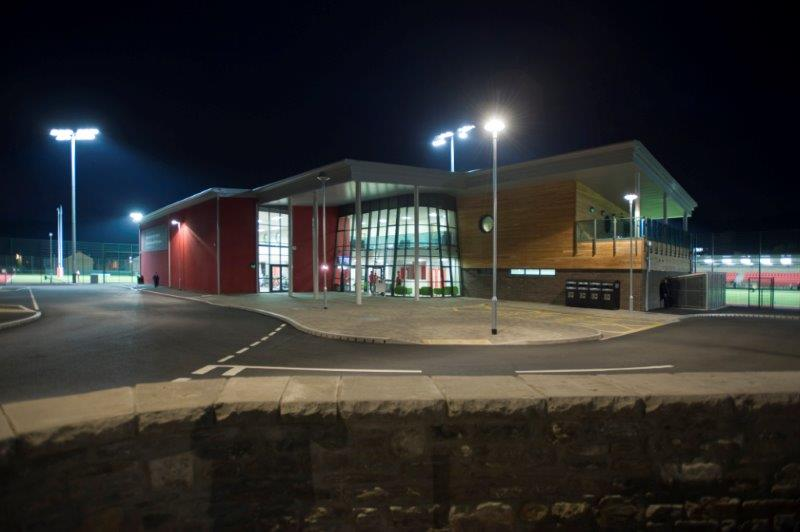
CCB Centre for Sporting Excellence main building front entrance

The CCB Centre for Sporting Excellence was erected on Caerphilly Road in May 2014. The centre has taken its place on the land of the old Ystrad Mynach Hospital and was built in conjunction with many partners, including Heron Bros Ltd Of Northern Ireland, at a cost of around £6 million. The facility is run by Caerphilly County Borough Council and it is hoped the local community will use the centre to create a thriving sporting culture within the region.

=== Valley Greyhound Stadium ===
The Valley Greyhound Stadium is a greyhound racing stadium in Twyn Road sandwiched between the Caerphilly Road and A469 and on the east bank of the Rhymney River (on the north side of the Dyffryn Business Park). It opened in 1976.

== New Cottage Dance Centre ==
The New Cottage Dance Centre is on The Bridge in Ystrad Mynach and is home to dance teams.

The 'Ystrad Fawr' formation teams have been successful in the British Championships. Their teams being former British Champions.

In 2016, the 'Ystrad Fawr Dancers' entered the talent contest, Britain's Got Talent and made it through the heats. On 21 May, it was then announced that the team got through to the semi-finals. They competed in the semi-final (23 May) and finished ninth place.

== Notable natives / residents ==
- Paul Atherton, film producer/director
- Richard Brake, actor
- Mervyn Burtch, composer
- Andy Fairweather Low, guitarist
- Green Gartside (born Paul Julian Strohmeyer; 22 June 1955) is a Welsh singer, songwriter and musician. He is the frontman of the band Scritti Politti.
- Delyth Jewell (born 1987 or 1988), Welsh politician
- Morgan Lindsay, (1857–1935), British Army officer and racehorse trainer
- Lauren Price, Olympic Gold Medal winner
- Greville Wynne, spy

== See also ==
- 2353 (Ystrad Mynach) Squadron ATC
