= Community hospital =

Type of hospital

A community hospital can be purely a nominal designation or have a more specific meaning. When specific, it refers to a hospital that is accessible to the general public and provides a general or specific medical care which is usually short-term, in a cost-effective setting, and also focuses on preventing illnesses as opposed to only treating them. The word community often occurs in the name of the hospital. The word community is used in the sense of a location-based community for a community hospital. The following sections describe community hospitals when referred to in specific countries.

== Singapore ==
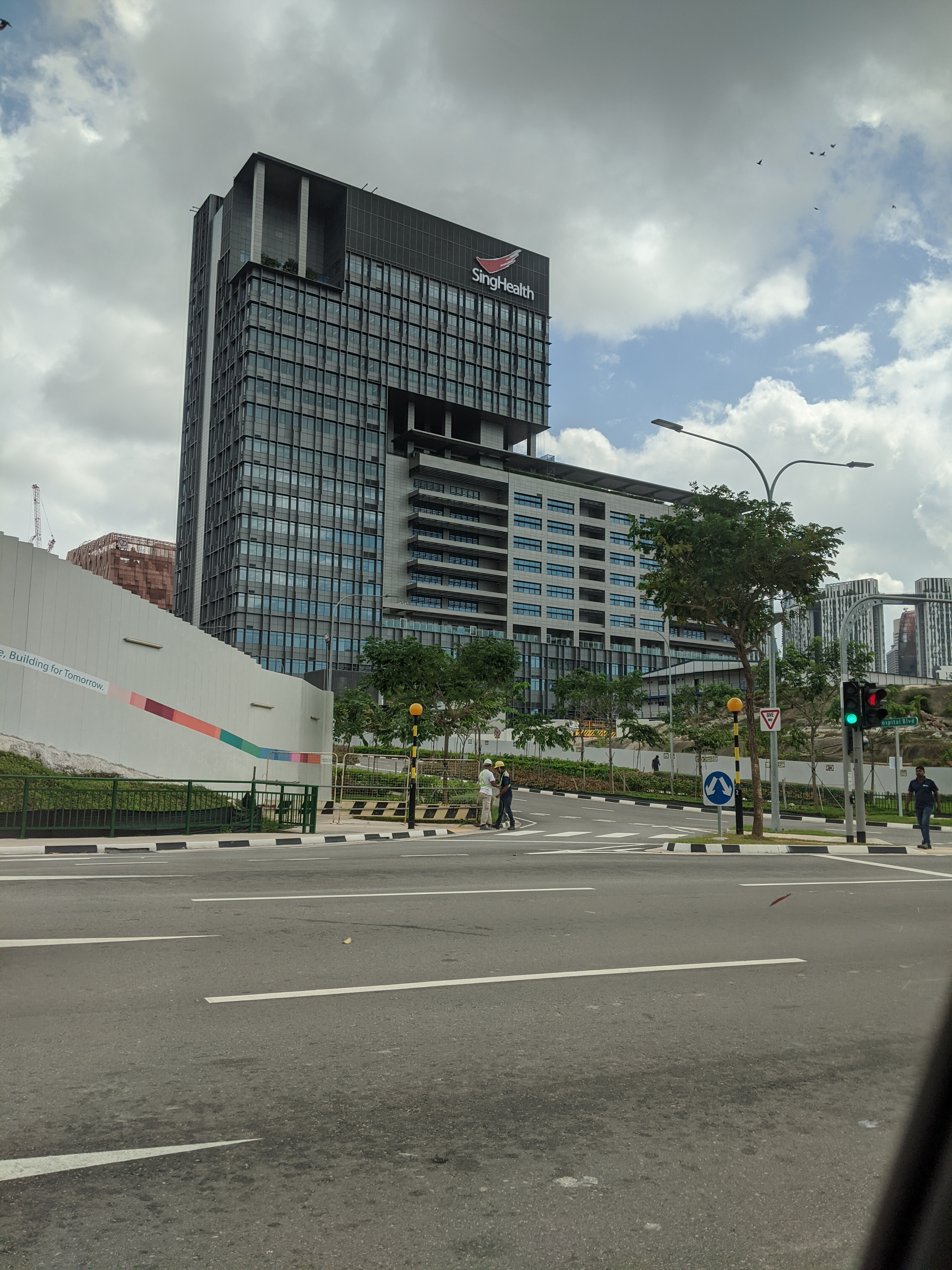
Outram Community Hospital, Singapore

In Singapore, community hospitals are a class of hospitals that provide continuation of care after discharge from acute hospitals, including rehabilitation and therapy.

== Thailand ==
In Thailand, community hospital is a specific classification of public hospitals with a capacity of 150 beds or fewer. They serve local populations in provincial districts, providing primary care.

== United Kingdom ==
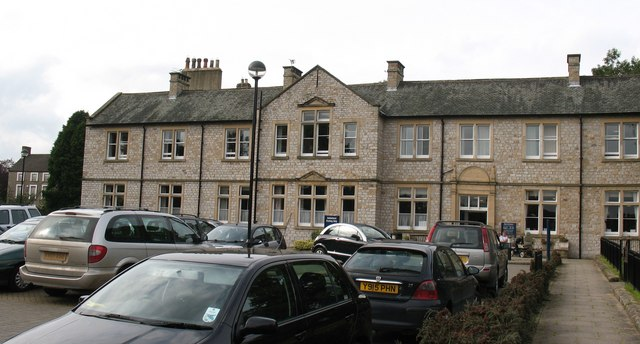
Friary Community Hospital, Richmond, England

An older term "cottage hospital" is now no longer applicable, having fallen from use because it inadequately describes the wide range of services being offered by their more modern equivalents. For many years the development of community hospitals was ad hoc, reflecting history rather than any rational planning.

=== Scotland ===
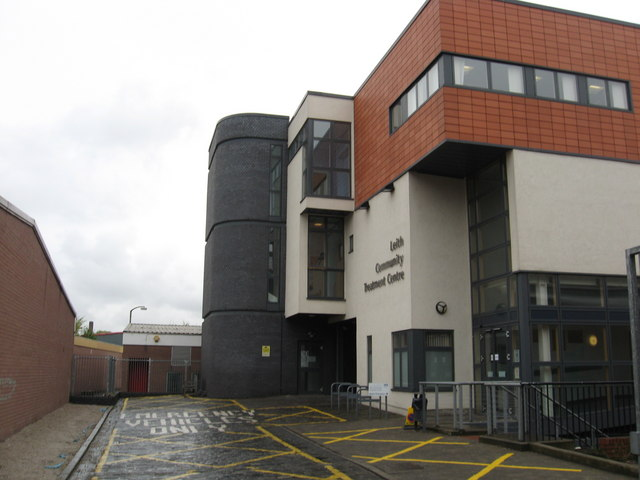
Leith Community Treatment Centre, Edinburgh, Scotland

The Scottish model is usually the characteristic one and the one used in the rest of the United Kingdom, with some variations. Scottish "Community Hospital" is not a statutory phrase but it is often used where there is "a unit or centre providing an appropriate range and format of accessible health care facilities and resources". Medical care is normally led by GPs, in liaison with consultant, nursing and allied health professional colleagues as necessary. These hospitals are typically small, using either purpose-built new premises or smaller general hospitals which have been retained to provide non-emergency services after general hospital services have been transferred to more centralised facilities; in some cases the services include in-patient care. Community hospitals can assist multidisciplinary working and can be used as an extended primary care resource. Community hospitals provide over 2,900 inpatient beds and over 750,000 outpatient, allied health professional and nurse led appointments. In many rural and remote communities this allows access to more specialised services and inpatient facilities closer to home.

=== England ===
The (non-statutory) phrase is used in England in a similar manner to Scotland. Actual arrangements will be under legislation applicable to the English NHS.

=== Northern Ireland ===
In Northern Ireland the phrase has similar use to Scotland but official publications give the appearance of community hospitals being more recent as a concept rather than a mere description.

=== Wales ===
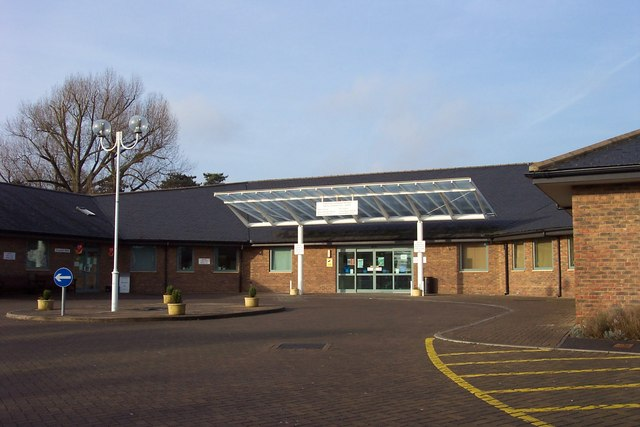
Chepstow Community Hospital, Wales

The (non-statutory) phrase is used in Wales in a similar (but possibly less restricted) manner to Scotland. Some are named as community hospitals and many more are also listed as having this function. Some community hospitals have been chosen to act as a hub for services. Actual arrangements will be under legislation applicable to NHS Wales/Gig Cymru.

== United States ==
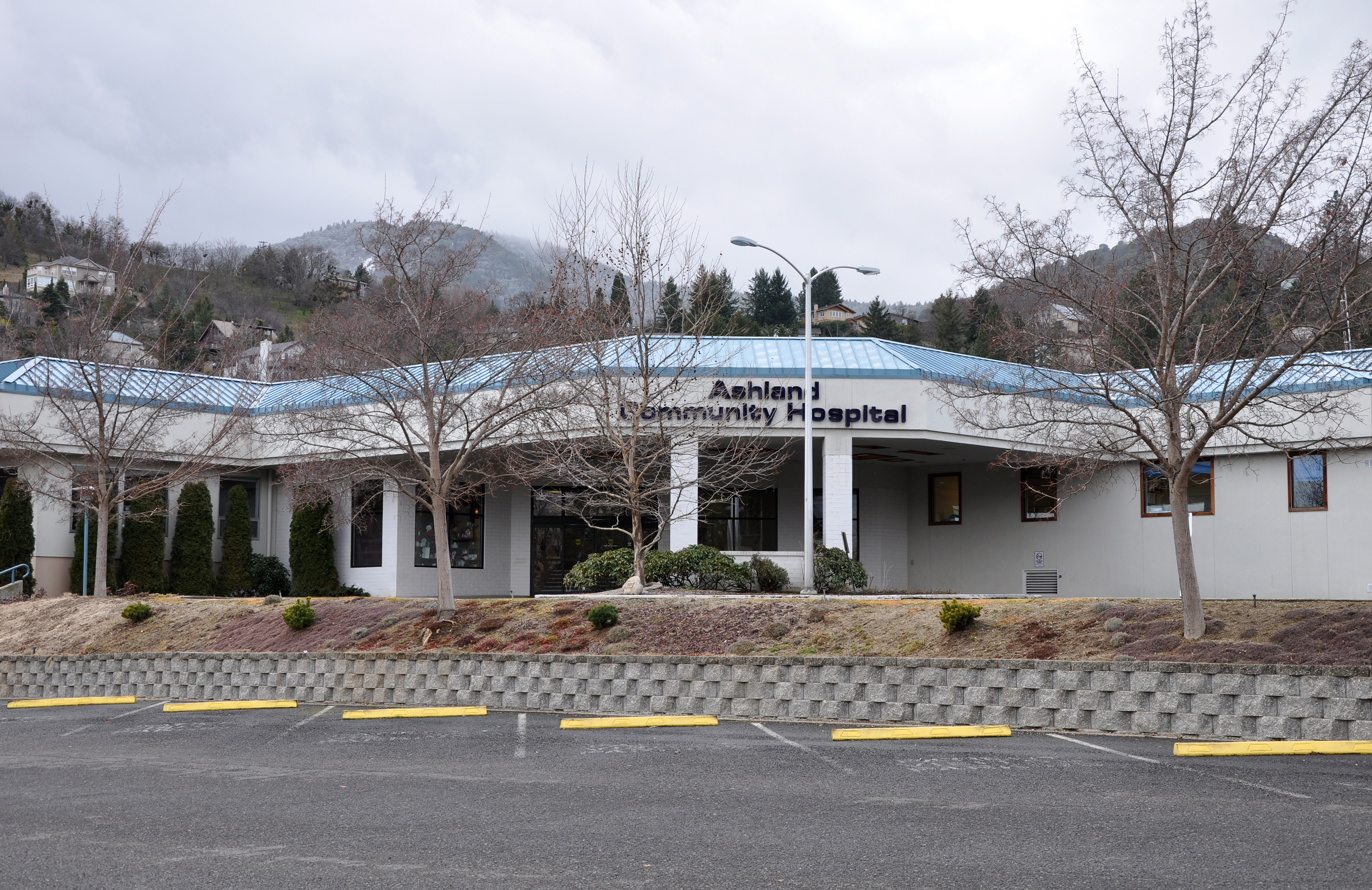
Ashland Community Hospital, Ashland, Oregon

Community of San Bernardino, California

The American Hospital Association (AHA) defines community hospitals as "all nonfederal, short-term general, and other special hospitals." Health associations and hospital rating organizations, however, typically also say that teaching hospitals are not community hospitals. Some further restrict the community hospital definition to only include independently run facilities serving a local demographic. A basic definition, therefore, is a hospital serving a local community, run by local leaders, providing financial opportunities for the local economy. A community hospital can be either rural or urban.

== Africa ==
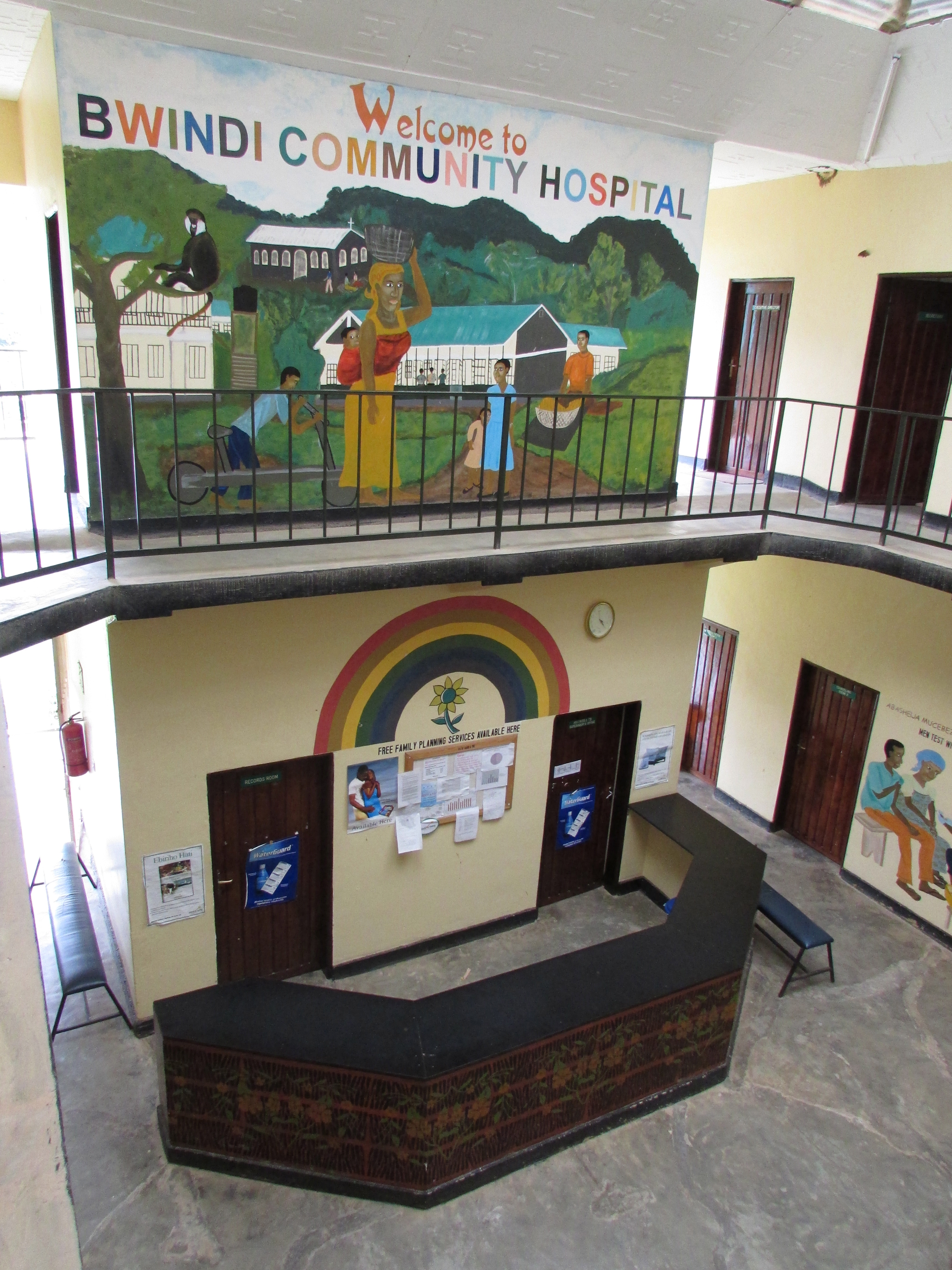
Bwindi Community Hospital, Uganda

Many of the rural hospitals in Africa are small, community hospitals.

=== Algeria ===
Algeria has 273 community hospitals denoted EPSP, which stands for etablissement de sante de publique de proximite in French. Polyclinics are also used at the community level. There is an average of one polyclinic per 25,000 inhabitants in Algeria.
