= Rhymney =

Rhymney: Welsh: Rhymni
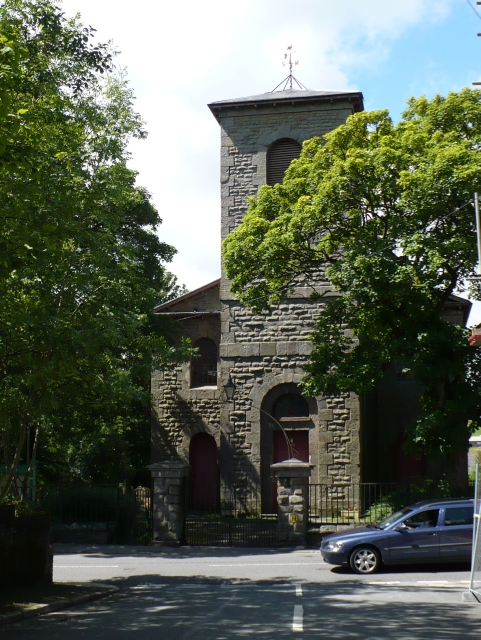
- Saint David's Church, Rhymney

- Location within Caerphilly
- Population: 8,845
- OS grid reference: SO115075
- Principal area: Caerphilly
- Preserved county: Gwent
- Country: Wales
- Sovereign state: United Kingdom
- Post town: BARGOED
- Postcode district: CF81
- Post town: TREDEGAR
- Postcode district: NP22
- Dialling code: 01685
- Police: Gwent
- Fire: South Wales
- Ambulance: Welsh
- UK Parliament: Blaenau Gwent and Rhymney
- Senedd Cymru – Welsh Parliament: Blaenau Gwent Caerffili Rhymni
- List of places UK Wales Caerphilly 51.759°N 3.283°W Map of the community

Rhymney (/ˈrʌmni/; Welsh: Rhymni [ˈr̥əmnɪ]) is a town and a community in the county borough of Caerphilly, South Wales. Until 1972 it existed in the historic county of Monmouthshire. With the villages of Pontlottyn, Fochriw, Abertysswg, Deri and New Tredegar, Rhymney is designated as the 'Upper Rhymney Valley' by the local Unitary Authority, Caerphilly County Borough Council. The community of Rhymney includes the town of Rhymney, Pontlottyn, Abertysswg, Butetown and Twyncarno.

Rhymney is known to many outside Wales from the song "The Bells of Rhymney", a musical adaptation of a poem by Idris Davies.

== Toponymy ==
Several authors have studied the toponymy of Rhymney. Morgan (1887) opined:

RHYMNEY.–This place takes its name from the river that flows through it. The root is rhym, what stretches around, what extends. It is cognate with the Gaelic word ruimne, marsh. Romney Marsh is now a large fertile tract of land situate at the most southern part of the county, but in olden times it was a worthless marsh overflowed at every tide. Ramsey, Old Romney, New Romney, and Rimina (Italy) are probably derived from the same source. The name Romney Marsh is one of the many instances we have of reduplication of synonyms. When we say Romney Marsh we say in effect Marsh Marsh, and we are guilty of such tautology as the Englishman is when he says River Avon, which is in effect River River. The English name – Marshton.

Thomas (1990, originally 1938) was similarly expansive, although from a perspective of different variations of the name Rhymney:

The village near the source [of the River Rhymney] has been stabilized as Rhymney since the fifties, when the railway came; the village near the mouth as Rumney. In the records from the opening of the twelfth century onwards the name undergoes many variations such as, Remni (Gilaldus), Rhymni, Reempni, Rymhi, Rumney, Remney, Remeney, and Remny (Leland, 1536), Rompney (Speed, 1610). Our less literate neighbours in Dowlais and Tredegar used to speak of going over to "the Rummmy", homogenous (to quote the Times) with one of the mildest adjectives in old fashioned schoolboy slang.

Mills (2003) cited 'Remni 1101, Rempny 1296, Rymney 1541.' He then defined Rhymney as '(Place on the) River Rhymney', to which he added 'The river name means "auger" (Welsh rhwmp + adjectival ending -ni, describing its boring action.'

== History ==
=== Early history ===
The countryside around present day Rhymney would have been very different in the early 17th century. In 1624 the parish of Bedwellty was created which covered the lower division of the Wentloog Hundred, in the county of Monmouth, a hilly district between the River Rhymney on the west and the Sirhowy River on the east. The upper Sirhowy Valley at this time would have been a natural well-wooded valley, consisting of a few farms and the occasional small ironworks where iron ore and coal had occurred together naturally. Later it would have contained the chapelries of Rhymney and Tredegar, the latter being known as a market town. Industrialisation began in the 1750s with the establishment of the Sirhowy Ironworks. However, in his famous An historical tour in Monmouthshire, historian William Coxe (1801) referred to:

the rich vale of Carno; the diffridfs fertilifed by the Rumney; the romantic vallies of the Ebwy and Sorwy; and the whole of the beautiful and undulating country I vlfited in thefe excurfions.

=== The Rhymney Iron Company ===
In 1906 John Edward Lloyd, the Welsh historian, documented that in 1800 David Evans, Thomas Williams, John Ambrose and Richard Cunningham entered into an agreement to build a furnace and to carry on an iron works and a cast iron trade on a plot of land owned by the Duke of Beaufort and Mr Glover. The name of the firm was The Union Iron Company. The works started production in 1801. Two years later negotiations were conducted by Benjamin Hall and a partnership was formed between Richard Crawshay, Watkin George, Benjamin Hall, Richard Cunningham and Thomas Williams to form The Union Iron Works Company. After documenting the arrangements of the partnership, Lloyd (1906) then documented: 'then appears the following remarkable provision:

It is also agreed that Coal may be used for manufacturing iron on the premises.'

about which Jones commented: 'Possibly it refers to a Small Forge or Smith's Shop being established.' In the following year a dispute arose between Cunningham and Crawshay whereby the latter accused the former 'with having improperly drawn up bills on account of the co-partnership', of being, as Lloyd (1906) put it, 'a swindler, or words to that effect.' Subsequently Cunningham responded to the dispute by inaugurating a suit against Crawshay and others which alleged that his signature on the deed of Dissolution of the previous partnership had been improperly obtained and under threats and duress, and was altogether void ....' Lloyd (1906) commented: 'it may be assumed that Mr. Cunningham could not, and did not, continue a member of the firm any longer'. And he observed that, after 1806:

A whole troupe of English Ironmasters had invaded the Welsh Hills, the indigenous Welsh inhabitants being either lookers-on, or hewers and drawers for those who, with capital and skill, soon changed the solitudes of the high plateau land and the valleys and slopes of the mountains, from a solitude into a teeming hive of human industry.
The Welsh looked on and wondered at the changes effected before their eyes: great furnaces being erected in every direction, and money lavishly expended by strangers, of whom they scarcely knew the names, and nothing as to where they came from, except from Staffordshire, London, or Bristol.

In 1825 the Bute Iron Works were built, so-called because it was built on land owned by the Marquess of Bute. It was situated on the right bank of the River Rhymney and immediately opposite the Union Iron Works. Its partners were William Forman, Thomas Seton and Thomas Johnson. The lease for the land was for 92 years. However, a few years after 1825 or thereabouts, the owners of the adjoining Bute Works and The Union Iron Works Company agreed that they should be amalgamated to form one company, the Rhymney Iron Company (Rhymney and Bute). Mushet (1840) observed that the company had six blast furnaces.

Edward Hutchins served as chair from 1851 to 1875.

=== Coal production ===
Coal mining was occurring at Rhymney by 1870, with employee strikes of 1871, 1873, and April 1875, with a strike averted there and at nearby Dowlais.

In 1906, Sir Henry W. Tyler, the Chairman of Rhymney Iron Company, Limited wrote to Lloyd from London in response to a request for information from him about the modern history of the iron works. Tyler recalled:

We formerly used to make excellent Steel Rails, and got a very good reputation for Iron and Steel Work generally; but when the price of Steel Rails fell, in consequence of foreign competition, we could not continue the Steel Works without serious loss, and they were discontinued in 1891, and the Furnaces and the Bessemer Plant were demolished, fortunately for the Company at that time, inasmuch as it has been doing better as a Coal Company than it was possible to do as a Steel and Iron Company. We now turn out about 850,000 tons of coal a year, and we are sinking four new Pits, one of which has already reached Coal, and others are expected to do so at the end of this year or early next year, which will, we hope, commence a new era of prosperity for the Company.

A strike was threatened in July 1890 by employees of the Taff Vale and Rhymney Railway, who were seeking a reduction of working hours down to sixty hours a week. The directors threatened to close the railway, and the Cardiff Docks and Colliery too, impacting 150,000 persons.

By the early 20th century the town's collieries employed nearly the entire local population.

September 1906 saw a short strike of 6,000 miners due to the employment of non-unionist labour. The scene again was repeated in April 1913, this time with 52,000 Rhondda and Rhymney union miners against the 50,000 non-union miners employed by mine owners.

August 1911 saw the South Wales anti-Jewish riots in Rhymney, Ebbw Vale, and Tredegar, over "a long-standing grievance with respect to house rents". Shops were looted, and persons injured in conflicts with police and military personnel.

In June 1920, 15,000 miners went on strike, in support of 2,000 miners of the nearby Bargoed Colliery, over safety concerns.

In June 1925, the Rhymney United Choir of 190 mixed voices under conductor John Price gave a command performance before King George V and the Queen at Windsor Castle. The choir had won the National Eisteddfod several times. Pieces included 'God Bless the Prince of Wales', 'Yr Haf', 'Bugeilio'r gweneth gwyn', 'Hob y deri dando', 'Efe a ddaw', 'Llan baglan', 'Aberystwyth', and the 'Welsh national anthem'.

Residents of the valley faced water shortages in October 1925 with a drought to the local reservoir. In late 1925, with the slump in a demand for British coal, 5000 miners of the valley were dismissed by the Powell Durry Steam Coal Company Limited; the valley population given to be 20,000.

After a visit to Rhymney and surrounding villages and towns in November 1936, King Edward VIII stated "Something will be done about unemployment" with a reference to the prolonged unemployment during the Depression.

Rhymney in March 1952 was also the site when Leader of the Labour Party, Aneurin Bevan defied party leader Clement Attlee and voted against the post-World War II defence rearmament programme.

Another drought faced the valley in August 1955 with one of the two valley's reservoirs dry.

The Hymac (also rendered as Hy-Mac; hydraulic machinery) hydraulic long reach excavator was assembled in the town from 1962 by the Rhymney Engineering Company, with an estimated 5600 units of the 580C model manufactured between 1970 and 1981. Employing up to 1500 people, the factory closed in 1983.

In November 1984, during the 1984–1985 miners' strike, a taxi driver was killed when a concrete block was dropped from a Rhymney Bridge roundabout footbridge upon him; two striking miners were convicted of manslaughter upon appeal, creating the leading case of R v Hancock [1985] UKHL 9.

=== Post-coal ===
Williams Medical Supplies business was established in 1986, and employs about 150 persons locally.

The town was subject of the documentary, The Welsh Valley that won the lottery, following a People's Postcode Lottery win in 2022 of £3.7M across over 400 residents.

== Facilities ==
A brewery was formed in 1839 as part of the iron company's supply of beer to the employees. In time this became Andrew Buchan's Breweries Limited until brewing ceased in 1978. The Rhymney Brewer line today was formed in 2005 and is based 20 miles (32 km) away in Blaenavon.

Rhymney railway station is on the Rhymney Line. The line features a viaduct that was built by the Rhymney Railway company to facilitate the line in 1857 after the incorporation of the company to build the line to the steel works in 1854. The viaduct which opened in 1858 was designed by English engineer Joseph Cubitt (1811–1872).

The Redwood Memorial Hospital was opened in 1904, but closed in 2013.

The town is home to the Cor Meibion Silwriaid Rhymni/Rhymney Silurian Male Choir, which was formed in 1951 to renew the tradition of male voice singing in Rhymney. During its history, the choir has won four National Eisteddfod titles and raised money for a number of charities. In June 2026 the choir participated in the Welsh Association of Male Choirs concert at Liverpool Cathedral to promote the culture.

=== Education ===
The town has Ysgol Gyfun Cwm Rhymnia, a Welsh language primary school, and a secondary school, Idris Davies School, that serves a catchment area which includes Fochriw, Pontlottyn and New Tredegar.

In 1999 the now former-Ystrad Mynach College launched its sister campus in Rhymney to serve the top end of the Rhymney Valley under the name The College Rhymney. The college underwent rapid growth after its opening, with over 700 students enrolling on various courses in the 2007–2008 academic year. By 2013, the now-Coleg y Cymoedd had Rhymney as one of its five college locations. The campus is now closed.

=== Religion ===
The parish church of Rhymney is a Grade II listed building that was constructed in the neo-classical style. It was built by architect Philip Hardwick from London on commission for Andrew Buchan who was the manager of the local Rhymney brewery between 1838–1858. The building was listed in 1990 and was noted for being one of the most 'interesting' examples of neoclassical architecture in South Wales. Buchan himself is buried in the parish church vaults and is commemorated with a plaque in the nave of the church. The parish is occasionally visited by enthusiasts of Hardwick's work who are interested in neo-classical buildings of this type.

== Notable people ==
See also Category:People from Rhymney

- Thomas Benjamin (1850–1925), Welsh language poet and congregational minister, was born at Carno Hill.
- John Collins (1949–2020), Welsh professional footballer.
- Walter Conway (1872–1933), long-time secretary of the Tredegar Medical Aid Society. Born in Plantation Street. Guardian and later chair of the Board of Guardians of the nearby Tredegar's Bedwellty Union Workhouse.
- Haydn Llewellyn Davies (1921–2008), Canadian artist.
- Idris Davies (1905–1953), celebrated Welsh poet. Was born in Field Street. After leaving school at the age of 14 he worked as a miner in the nearby Abertysswg and Rhymney Mardy Pits. After participating in the failed General Strike of 1926, Davies moved to London where he worked as a teacher at various schools. Four volumes of his poetry were published during his lifetime: Gwalia Deserta (1938), The Angry Summer: A Poem of 1926 (1943), Tonypandy and other poems (1945), and Selected Poems (1953).
- Bill Evans (1857–1935), Welsh international rugby union player.
- Bob Evans (1921–2003), Welsh rugby union flanker, playing ten internationals for Wales, and British Lions six tests of the 1950 tour of Australia and New Zealand.
- Harry Greene (1923–2013), television personality.
- Tom James (born 1987), Wales international rugby union wing.
- John Jarman (1931–2009), footballer and coach.
- Wilf John (1904–1983), Commonwealth Games lawn bowler.
- Abel J. Jones (1878–1949), writer.
- Berwyn Jones (1940–2007), sprint athlete, rugby union, and professional rugby league footballer.
- David-Rocky Jones (1949–1995), professional darts player.
- Thomas Jones (1870–1955), professor, civil servant, administrator and author. Born in the High Street. Later a clerk at the Rhymney Iron and Steel Works, attended the University College of Wales, Aberystwyth and Glasgow University. In 1910 became Secretary of the Welsh National Campaign against Tuberculosis. Later appointed Secretary of the National Health Insurance Commission (Wales), Assistant Secretary to the Cabinet, becoming Deputy Secretary. His daughter, the Labour Party politician Eirene White, was later granted the title Baroness White of Rhymney.
- Cornelius Lundie (1815–1908), engineer. Born in Kelso, Scotland, education in Scotland and variously worked in Scotland, New South Wales, Australia, and England. In 1861 he was appointed the manager of the Rhymney Railway. For over 40 years, he was, until a few years prior to his death, the consulting director of the Company, and discharged the duties of that office until the very end. As an engineer he designed and constructed many extensions of the system and widenings of the main line, including a double-way tunnel under the Cefn Onn or Caerphilly mountain, and a masonry viaduct of seven spans over the River Taff, besides new locomotive shops at Caerphilly, and other works. He was 93 when he died in 1908 and is thought to be the oldest railway director of his time.
- Alfred Mathews (1864–1946), rugby union player and later priest.
- Wayne Mumford (born 1964), English Football League footballer.
- Ken Oakley (1929–2017), Welsh professional footballer.
- John D. Reese (1855–1931), US Major League Baseball trainer.
- David Rocyn-Jones (1862–1953), medical officer of health.
- Eric Weaver (born 1943), Welsh footballer.

== "The Bells of Rhymney" ==
Rhymney is known to many outside Wales due to folk singer Pete Seeger's 1957 song "The Bells of Rhymney". The lyrics to the song are drawn from a poem by Idris Davies, and the poem was first published in Davies' 1938 anthology Gwalia Deserta. The poem was inspired by the failure of the 1926 General Strike and by the Marine Colliery disaster of 1 March 1927. In addition to Rhymney, the poem also refers to the church bells of Merthyr, Rhondda, Blaina, Caerphilly, Neath, Brecon, Swansea, Newport, Cardiff and the Wye Valley.

The song has been covered by a number of acts over the years, including Judy Collins, Cher, the Alarm, the Ian Campbell Folk Group, John Denver, Robyn Hitchcock, Oysterband and Ralph McTell. Arguably the most widely known rendition of the song, however, was that recorded by the American band the Byrds for their 1965 album Mr. Tambourine Man.
