= In Place of Strife =

1969 UK Government white paper

In Place of Strife (Cmnd 3888)

In Place of Strife (Cmnd 3888) was a UK Government white paper written in 1969. It was a proposed act to use the law to reduce the power of trade unions in the United Kingdom, but was never passed into law. The title of the paper was a reworking of the title of Nye Bevan's book In Place of Fear.

It was proposed by the Secretary of State for Employment and Productivity, Barbara Castle. Amongst its numerous proposals were plans to force unions to call a ballot before a strike was held and establishment of an Industrial Board to enforce settlements in industrial disputes. The Labour Cabinet of the Prime Minister, Harold Wilson, was divided over the issue. The proposals had been drafted in secret by Wilson and Castle. Divisions quickly appeared within the Cabinet when the proposals were presented, with the opposition led by Home Secretary James Callaghan. A settlement was eventually reached with the Trades Union Congress whereby the proposals were dropped.

Although the paper itself never resulted in legislation, it was influential in the drafting of the Trade Union and Labour Relations Act 1974 ("TULRA"). TULRA, which subsequently became the Trade Union and Labour Relations (Consolidation) Act 1992, had repealed Robert Carr's controversial Industrial Relations Act 1971. The white paper's requirement that strike action could only take place after a trade union ballot would later become a key component of TULRA.

A copy of the paper may be downloaded from the National Archives.
