= Bedwellty Union Workhouse =

Building in Tredegar, Wales

Coordinates: 51°45′52″N 3°13′53″W

The Bedwellty Union Workhouse was situated in Georgetown, Tredegar in the historic county of Monmouthshire, in South East Wales. It is 2.9 miles (4.7 km) from the Nanybwtch Junction of the part of the A465 road which is commonly referred to as the Heads of the Valleys Road. The building existed for approximately 127 years. It was also used as a hospital. A housing estate, St James Park, now stands where the building once stood.

== Life before the workhouse ==
Until 1834, poor relief was distributed at the discretion of the local parish from money raised from tax on property known as the poor rate. The way in which poor relief was administered varied enormously from area to area on a case-by-case basis. The population explosion from the Industrial Revolution turned many small rural parishes into the large towns overnight; this together with the unpredictable employment made poor law relief unsustainable. In 1832, the government appointed a royal commission to investigate the distribution of poor law relief in a sample of 3,000 parishes either by questionnaire or visits. A leading commissioner, later secretary of the Poor Law Commission, Edwin Chadwick believed that the system required a comprehensive reform and control from a main body in London. He also held the belief that the existing system: "needed to be reformed in such a way as to deter people from making unnecessary demands on public funds." The Poor Law Amendment Act 1834 was passed and a Poor Law Commission for England and Wales was set up in London employing inspectors to oversee the necessary changes. Single parishes were grouped together to form Unions and a total of 600 locally elected Board of Guardians ran these unions; this was the birth of local government. The Unions oversaw the poor relief in their particular geographical areas and were also instructed to build a workhouse to provide indoor relief to all those unable to support themselves financially. The able-bodied poor became the focus of the government reforms, as Fowler explains: "the poor law regime was specifically designed to discourage the entry of such people by making conditions worse than they might expect outside and offering a variety of further petty humiliations, from uncomfortable uniforms and dull food to tedious, unending tasks...taking the guardians’ hospitality was designed to be a degrading process and none but the desperate would undergo.".

In 1837, Abergavenny Union was formed and then in 1849, the western part of the union comprising Bedwellty and Aberystruth separated and were joined the parishes of Ebbw Vale, Abertillery, Tredegar and Rhymney to create Bedwellty Poor Law Union. The Union was overseen by a Board of Guardians that had been elected by local landowners.

== The old workhouse ==
Prior to the formation of poor law unions, the parishes supported those in poverty, either maintaining them in their homes with 'outdoor' relief or ‘indoor relief' in already existing workhouses. Tredegar had an existing workhouse, known as Twyn Y Ddraenen (Thornhill), situated in the centre of Queen Square. The building still stands today, and has been converted into three houses.

== The replacement of the old workhouse ==
The Bedwellty Board of Guardians built a new workhouse in the Georgetown area of Tredegar and they also continued to give ‘outdoor relief’, as there was a lack of adequate workhouse accommodation in periods of high unemployment. This was evident in the Welsh Coal Strike of 1889, when Adams states "a deputation of unemployed men from Abertillery and Blaina waited on the Board, asking for help." The Board of Guardians did not allow relief in industrial disputes so stone breaking was offered as a means of employment for outdoor relief.

There are some positive things to note about the Bedwellty Union workhouse. From the beginning provision was made for educating child inmates by employing a school mistress. Consequently in 1857 a committee made a positive School inspection. These innovations would be seen as forward thinking because compulsory education had not been introduced into England and Wales until the Elementary Education Act 1880. Also, in 1901 the origins of the nurse training that became part of St James Hospital began in the workhouse infirmary when probationary nurses were first employed.

The building, which was designed by a Mr Humphries of Cheltenham, was completed and opened with capacity for 300 inmates in 1852. Mr and Mrs Keogh were the first employed members of staff as respectively, Master and Matron. Other employees in the workhouse included a Medical Officer, Dr T.G. Anthony; the Rev. Wm. Jones, in the role of chaplain; a school-mistress; a nurse and a porter. Nevertheless, the new workhouse soon became feared and hated: families who entered were separated many regarded it as a prison and discipline was harsh. The community tried to keep ill, aged and families of those men injured at work in their homes by collections to provide money for food and rent. People would avoid the workhouse because of the humiliation and stigma that it induced. Consequently entering it was considered a last resort.

Around 1882, Walter Conway, who was to become the Secretary of the Tredegar Medical Aid Society (whose model helped to shape the principles of the NHS), became an inmate as a boy, after the death of his father. Conway was an inmate for about 2½ years. He had positive memories of his time there. He learned from the master the lesson 'to do everything well'. And while he was there he acquired his love of books.

In 1901 a new building was added to the existing one, which is believed to be the Infirmary. Soon afterwards in 1904, at the request of the local Registrar, the workhouse was named 'Ty Bryn’ to prevent the stigmatization of inmates who were born there.

In 1902 James Callaghan murdered his common law wife Hannah Shea. She was living at the workhouse with their children and he was staying in lodgings in the town. He was convicted and then executed at Usk Prison. He was hung by brothers William and John Billington.

=== The addition of cottage homes for the children ===
Shelter at the workhouse was in constant demand and often the building was overcrowded. For example, in 1902 a poor law inspection discovered that many inmates shared beds. The Bedwellty Union Board of Guardians decided to build cottage homes for the workhouse children to alleviate the overcrowding. This was also an attempt to improve the environment in which the children received care. The cottage homes opened in 1905 at Park Row Tredegar and housed 75 children in five separate houses with a foster mother living in each. This new concept of providing care was inspired by the provision of care by European institutions, for example by the Rauhe Haus (a mistranslation of which is 'rough house') in Horn, Germany. Care was also provided for children in smaller homes which belonged to the union in other towns.

The demand for the workhouse provision continued and in 1908 the building was enlarged and now had capacity for 440 inmates.

Also in 1908, Walter Conway was elected as a guardian on the Board of Guardians.

In 1915 Walter Conway was elected as the Chairman of the Board of Guardians.

=== The use of the workhouse during World War I ===
In January 1919 the workhouse infirmary was used as an auxiliary military hospital, the cottage homes for children provided facilities for the sick who would have been cared for in the workhouse infirmary. The cottages were utilised as follows: No's 1 and 2 Maternity, female and children; No's 4 and 5 male patients and dispensary and No 3 administration, housing for staff and the cook. The sick and wounded soldiers were then transferred to 3rd Western General Hospital, Cardiff in July.

== The conversion of the workhouse into a hospital ==
The workhouse continued to shelter the poor and infirm until 1930 when the Bedwellty Union and its Board of Guardians were abolished. The workhouse then became known as the 'County Infirmary' and was run by Monmouthshire County Council.

Following the enactment of the National Health Service Act 1946 in 1948, the County Infirmary was renamed 'St James Hospital' and came under the management of the North Monmouthshire Hospital Management Committee. At this time it: “was in need of major investment to meet the demands of a contemporary hospital” The hospital also still provided shelter for those who were not requiring medical care. There was a chronic shortage of nursing staff which resulted in general and maternity beds being closed in the 1950s. A campaign was launched to recruit and re-train nursing staff. A new operating theatre was open in 1963 will help from General Surgeon Mr. J S. McConnachie, the hospital took on acute care with surgical beds, a pathology department and dispensary service.

In 1969 the building of the new Nevill Hall Hospital first phase was completed the surgical beds were transferred there from St James Hospital leaving medical and maternity beds. The second phase of Nevill Hall Hospital was completed in 1970 and St James Hospital’s maternity beds were also transferred.

== The end of an era ==
The hospital closed in 1976 and was demolished in 1979. Today the site is a housing estate known as St James Park.

== See also ==
- Bedwellty
