= WMS =

WMS can refer to:

== Technology and computing ==
- Warehouse management system
- Workflow management system
- Web Map Service, a standard for Internet map servers
- Windows Media Services, the streaming media server from Microsoft
- Windows MultiPoint Server, a Microsoft Windows Server for Remote Desktops
- WMS (hydrology software), watershed simulation software
- Welfare Management System (NYC), New York, US
- Workload management system, a component of gLite

== Medicine ==
- Wilderness Medical Society, US, for medical personnel working in the wilderness
- Wechsler Memory Scale of memory function
- Warwick Medical School, British medical school of Warwick University

== Companies ==
- WMS Industries and subsidiary WMS Gaming, US electronic gaming and amusement companies
- Williams Medical Supplies, a medical supplies company, Rhymney, Wales

== Schools ==
- Waldron Middle School in Waldron, Arkansas
- West Monmouth School in Pontypool, Wales
- White Mountain School in Bethlehem, New Hampshire,

== Other ==
- Written ministerial statement, a formal announcement by a government minister that is released to the media (as opposed to being given in person in Parliament).
