= John Jarman (footballer) =

Welsh footballer and coach

Personal information
- Full name: John Emlyn Jarman
- Date of birth: 4 February 1931
- Place of birth: Rhymney, Wales
- Date of death: 21 October 2009 (aged 78)
- Place of death: Forest Town, England
- Position: Wing-half

Senior career*
Years	Team	Apps	(Gls)
1949–1950	Wolverhampton Wanderers	0	(0)
1950–1956	Barnsley	45	(1)
1956–1958	Walsall	37	(2)
- * Club domestic league appearances and goals

John Emlyn Jarman (4 February 1931 – 21 October 2009) was a Welsh footballer and coach.

As a player, Jarman began his career at Wolverhampton Wanderers, but never played for the club, in part because of a serious knee injury. He was sold to Barnsley in 1950 for an £8,000 transfer fee. In six years at Oakwell, he played 47 games and scored two goals. He later moved to Walsall as player-coach. In 1958, he retired as a player because of injuries.

In 1962, Jarman became chief coach at West Bromwich Albion. Five years later, he joined the Football Association as a regional staff coach with responsibility for the Midlands, and subsequently held a similar job for the Football Association of Ireland. He returned to club football in 1977, when he rejoined Wolverhampton Wanderers, and held a senior coaching role serving under managers John Barnwell, Sammy Chung and Ian Greaves.

In March 1983, following Ian Greaves' appointment as manager of Mansfield Town, Jarman was named the club's assistant manager. Greaves and Jarman worked together at Field Mill for the next six years, which are widely regarded as one of Mansfield's most successful periods in the club's history, winning promotion in 1985–86, and winning the Associate Members' Cup at Wembley the following season.

Jarman left Mansfield Town in September 1988, and later worked for Derby County, where he helped to establish the Rams Soccer Academy in the early 1990s. In his later years, he settled in Forest Town near Mansfield, and helped out coaching youngsters at his local football club Forest Town Welfare until 2008. He died in October 2009, aged 78.
