= Walter Conway =

British socialist (1872–1933)

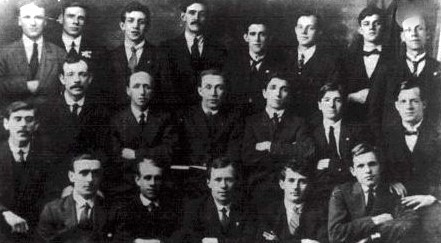
The Tredegar Query Club was started by friends including Aneurin Bevan and Walter Conway. Conway is in the middle of the picture. Aneurin is second from right on the back row and his brother Billy is second right on the front row.

Walter Conway (1872 – 1933) was the longstanding secretary of the Tredegar Medical Aid Society in Tredegar, in the historic county of Monmouthshire, South East Wales. The society contributed the model which established the British National Health Service.

== Early life ==
John Walter Conway, was born in October 1872 to Thomas Conway, an iron puddler, and Mary Conway (née Thomas), in Plantation Street, Rhymney. He had one sibling, his brother Thomas, who was born four years later.

The 1881 census documents that Conway's father had become a single parent, living with his two young sons in Tredegar, in the next valley. Perhaps his father decided to move the short distance to Tredegar to find work there. It had coal mines and an iron works, and was a boom town. While Conway was still a child, his father died. Consequently, he was placed (with, presumably, his brother) in the care of the Bedwellty Union Workhouse, the town's workhouse. The building was called 'Ty Bryn'. However, the local residents informally called it 'The Spike’.

Conway described himself as a 'workhouse boy'. He obtained two benefits from his stay in the workhouse. He learnt from the Master, the formal head of the workhouse, the lesson 'to do everything well'. And he became acquainted with the world of books, which he described as being his best friends.

== Adult life ==
On 19 December 1898, Conway married Mary Elizabeth Morgan from Tredegar, who was three years his junior. The entry for his 'Rank or profession' in their marriage certificate was 'coal miner'. They lived in Glyn Terrace, Tredegar. The couple had four children, three daughters and one son. The eldest child was Catherine Ann, who was born c.1900. The next eldest was Christina, who was born c.1902. The next eldest was Mary Elizabeth, who was born c.1904. The son died in the late 1980s. Catherine died when she was a young married woman. She is buried in the new part of Cefn Golau Cemetery, Tredegar.

Conway became a mentor and teacher to the teenage Aneurin Bevan, who like him was a resident of Tredegar. He also helped Bevan to manage his stutter. The Medical Society was already employing doctors under its Medical Superintendent, but it went on to open offices and a dentists and a central surgery.

During the winter of 1920–1921, Conway, Bevan and other friends formed the Query Club, which was a radical debating society.

Conway was a devout and very active Presbyterian. He was a deacon of Park Place Presbyterian Church, where he and his family attended three services on Sundays. A photograph of a class of the Church Sunday School seen in Tredegar Museum shows him in the centre, doubtless as the teacher.

== Public life ==
From 1891, Tredegar had had a Workmen's Institute Library that was run by the main employer in the town, the Tredegar Iron and Coal Company. It was financed by contributions that were deducted at source from the earnings of its employees and administered by a committee which comprised members from each of the Company's coal mines. In 1900 Conway was one of the eight members for the library on the committee for the Pochin No. 1 Pit, where he worked. (The name 'Pochin' comes from Henry Pochin, an English industrial chemist, who was one of the directors of the Company.

In 1908, Conway was elected as a guardian on the Board of Guardians of the town's workhouse, the Bedwellty Union Workhouse, in which capacity he served more than twenty years. Some of his colleagues on the Board of Guardians were members of the new Independent Labour Party (ILP), which had been established in Bradford in 1893. The party had members in many parts of south Wales. However, a branch of the party was established in the town much later than in other parts of South Wales, in 1911, which might have reflected the traditional allegiance of the local working class to the Liberal Party.

In April 1915, while employed as a haulier in a local colliery, Conway was elected as the chairman of Bedwellty Board of Guardians. Also in 1915, from more than fifty applicants, and a shortlist of five applicants, he was appointed as the Secretary of the Tredegar Medical Aid Society, which he had enthusiastically supported since at least 1909. He remained in office for the whole of his life. The following year, in addition to undertaking this role, he gave classes on social science under the auspices of the London-based Central Labour College (CLC), which had been established in 1909 with the financial help of the South Wales Miners' Federation. The motto of the College was "Agitate Educate Organise".

Conway was also a prominent trade union leader and occupied important positions in workmen's organisations. Also he came to hold at least three prestigious positions in the town. In addition to being the Secretary of the Medical Aid Society, he was chairman of both the Board of Guardians of Bedwellty Workhouse and the Assessment Committee of Bedwellty Union. Kenneth M. Bryant commented about Conway's former role:

'At one point during the period of his chairmanship, a great controversy raged over the apparently reckless spending by the Board of Guardians, and Conway, as chairman, was responsible for thrashing out this issue with the government of the day. His grasp of the problems and his attitude towards the difficulties much impressed the government department personnel with whom he came into contact.'

Bryant also commented about Conway's latter role:

'His extensive knowledge of Assessment Law enabled him to "hold his own" with the leading acknowledged experts in this field. There was very little he did not know about Assessment Law and the principles of rating.'

== Tredegar Medical Aid Society ==
While Conway was the Secretary of the Medical Aid Society he enabled it to provide medical services to the people of Tredegar. By the 1920s, it provided medical services to 95% of the local inhabitants who in 1921 numbered 25,000. By 1925, The Society purchased the redundant Palace cinema which they converted into an additional surgery as well as establishing space for their own dental mechanic. These surgeries liaised with the Tredegar General Hospital which had existed since 1904.

The Society employed A. J. Cronin, a Scottish doctor who later became a novelist, and who depicted it in his 1937 novel The Citadel wrote that Conway never saw himself portrayed as "Owen" in the 1938 film The Citadel, which was based on the novel and in his 1952 fictionalised autobiography Adventures in Two Worlds. Similar societies existed in the South Wales valleys and England. However, inevitably Bevan drew upon his local society as a model when, as Minister of Health in the post-war Labour government, he created the National Health Service.

Harold Finch, who from 1950 to 1970 was the local MP, wrote:

'It was, in fact, a local health service. Its success was in large measure due to Walter Conway, of Tredegar, who, as secretary, with a committee of about thirty members, controlled and administered the Society's affairs.'

Harold Finch later described Conway as 'a likeable fellow, sincere, able and dedicated to the Society's work, and overcame many difficulties which from time to time faced the Society. Differences of opinion would arise between committee-men.' He concluded that Conway was 'the embodiment of truth and integrity and of all that was good in the life of Tredegar.'

At one stage the Society employed five doctors, two dentists with a mechanic each, pharmacy dispensers and assistants and a nurse. Not only did the society see to the medical expenses but it also supplied good wages and conditions for its staff. The doctors were allowed to undertake private work which again was a model followed within the National Health Service when it was established just over a decade after Conway died.

== Legacy ==
Conway is buried in Cefn Golau Cemetery, Tredegar. A photograph of the lengthy funeral procession shows the mourners making their way on foot from the town up the hill to the cemetery. He has a street named after him in Tredegar.

In October 2024 a series of events was held in Tredegar to commemorate the life and work of Conway. Jeremy Miles MS, the Cabinet Secretary for Health and Social Care of the Welsh Government, and Julie Watkin and Allison Nutland, his great-granddaughters, unveiled a blue plaque on 1 Rawlinson Terrace in the town, his marital home. And artist Paul Shepherd (Walls by Paul) painted a mural in the shopping centre which comprises a photograph of Conway surrounded by depictions of four local places which were prominent in his life: Pochin No. 1 Pit, Park Place Presbyterian Church, the offices of the Medical Aid Society which were based in Number 10, The Circle and the Central Surgery in Church Street.
