= Tredegar General Hospital =

- Aneurin Bevan Local Health Board
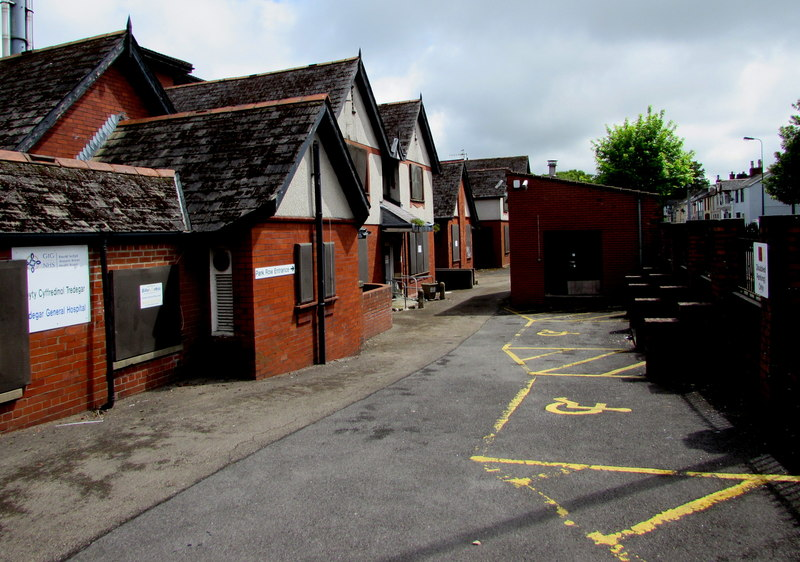
- Tredegar General Hospital

- Shown in Blaenau Gwent

Geography
- Location: Tredegar, Wales, United Kingdom
- Coordinates: 51.7700°N 3.2472°W

Organisation
- Care system: Public NHS
- Type: Community Hospital

Services
- Emergency department: No Accident & Emergency
- Beds: 58

History
- Founded: December 1904
- Closed: 2010

Links
- Lists: Hospitals in Wales

Tredegar General Hospital (Welsh: Ysbyty Cyffredinol Tredegar) was a community hospital in Tredegar, Blaenau Gwent, Wales. It was managed by the Aneurin Bevan Local Health Board.

== History ==
In 1901, the Tredegar Medical Aid Society convened a public meeting to discuss the establishment of a hospital and eventually a committee of more than 30 members was set up to build and manage it. Land for the new hospital was donated by Lord Tredegar. Funding came from the Tredegar Iron and Coal Company, other local employers and organisations, private and public donations and by the workmen mainly from the pits who agreed to maintain the hospital by having an extra halfpenny a week deducted from their wages. It was opened as Tredegar Park Cottage Hospital in December 1904.

Walter Conway was employed as secretary of the Medical Aid Society from 1915 and contributed to making the community health scheme a success. A.J. Cronin, whose 1937 novel, The Citadel, brought much attention to Tredegar's grassroots healthcare system, worked as a doctor at the hospital during the early 1920s. Aneurin Bevan, founder of the National Health Service, became a member of the Cottage Hospital Management Committee around 1928 and was chairman between 1929 and 1930.

After services transferred to the new Ysbyty Aneurin Bevan in Ebbw Vale, Tredegar General Hospital closed in 2010. The health board has proposed that a Health and Wellbeing Centre be established on the site.
