= Abel J. Jones =

Welsh writer

Abel J. Jones OBE
- Born: Abel John Jones; 26 May 1878; Rhymney, Bedwellty, Monmouthshire, Wales
- Died: 8 May 1949 (aged 70); Porthcawl, South Wales
- Education: University College of Wales, Aberystwyth; University of Jena; Clare College, Cambridge
- Occupation: writer
- Parents: David Rees Jones (father); Hannah Jones (née Evans) (mother)

Abel John Jones OBE (26 May 1878 – 8 May 1949), was a Welsh writer.

== Early years ==
Jones was born in Rhymney, Bedwellty, Monmouthshire. His parents, David Rees Jones and Hannah Jones (née Evans) and his sister Annie and brothers Rees and David Rees spoke only Welsh whereas Abel spoke Welsh and English (and later German) fluently. He originally left school at the age of fourteen to work in a shop: after fifteen months he became a pupil-teacher for five years.

== Wireless ==
He was involved with Guglielmo Marconi's first wireless signal transmission over water on 13 May 1897 from Lavernock Point to Flatholm Island in south Wales.

== Degree ==
Abel studied at the University College of Wales, Aberystwyth from 1898 to 1901, and was awarded a BSc.

== Teaching career ==
He taught science and mathematics and was Senior Master at Narberth County Intermediate School, Pembrokeshire, from February 1904 to July 1905 under the headmastership of John Morgan MA.

== PhD and Cambridge University ==
From 1905 to 1906 he studied at the German University of Jena under the philosopher Rudolf Christoph Eucken and was awarded a PhD. From 1906 Abel was Scholar of Clare College, Cambridge reading for the Moral Sciences Tripos (BA 1908, MA 1912).

After leaving Cambridge, Abel taught in elementary and secondary schools (including Bootham School, York) and lectured in Philosophy at Clare College before his appointment as an assistant lecturer in the Education Department of the University College, Cardiff.

== OBE ==
He became the youngest person to be appointed one of His Majesty's Inspector of Schools in Wales (1910–1938). During the years 1914–1918, he was Secretary for War Savings in Glamorgan for which he was later awarded an OBE.

== Books published ==
He had at least nine books published, the first of which concerned Rudolf Euken (1912) (see above). In 1938 he invented a much improved version of shorthand which proved very popular, "Abbrevia Shortwriting," and in 1939 wrote a biography of "John Morgan MA - A Man Elect of Men" (also see above).

Two auto-biographical books appeared in 1943 and 1944; "I Was Privileged" and "From an Inspector's Bag" and a further two books with a more philosophical outlook were published in 1944 and 1945 "In Search of Truth" and "For a Human Advance".

He died in Porthcawl, south Wales.
