= John Collins (footballer, born 1949) =

Welsh footballer (1949–2020)

Personal information
- Full name: John Lindsay Collins
- Date of birth: 21 January 1949
- Place of birth: Rhymney, Wales
- Date of death: 14 April 2020 (aged 71)
- Place of death: Milford Haven, Wales
- Height: 5 ft 9 in (1.75 m)
- Position: Full back

Youth career
- Swansea
- 1964–1966: Tottenham Hotspur

Senior career*
Years	Team	Apps	(Gls)
1966	Tottenham Hotspur	2	(0)
1971–1973	Portsmouth	74	(0)
1974	Dallas Tornado	18	(1)
1974–1976	Halifax Town	82	(1)
1976	Sheffield Wednesday	7	(0)
1976–1980	Barnsley	130	(1)
1980	Kidderminster Harriers		

International career
	Wales U23	5	(0)
- * Club domestic league appearances and goals

John Lindsay Collins (21 January 1949 – 14 April 2020) was a Welsh professional footballer who played for Tottenham Hotspur, Portsmouth, Dallas Tornado, Halifax Town, Sheffield Wednesday, Barnsley, Kidderminster Harriers and represented Wales at schoolboy and seven occasions at Under-23 level.

== Playing career ==
Collins was born in Rhymney, and began his career in Wales at Swansea then in March 1964 he moved to London to become an apprentice with Tottenham Hotspur. The full back played two first team matches for Spurs in the old First Division. His debut came against Sunderland which ended in defeat followed by another defeat against Nottingham Forest.

He signed for Portsmouth for a fee of £5,000 in May 1971, Collins made his debut in the opening game of the 1971–72 season at home against Middlesbrough which ended with a 2–1 victory. He went on to compete in a total of 87 matches.

After leaving Fratton Park, Collins joined the North American Soccer League team Dallas Tornado in 1974 and featured in 18 matches and scored one goal. Collins was transferred to Halifax Town in August 1974 and featured in a further 82 games and scored one goal. He had a spell with Sheffield Wednesday where he notched up seven appearances in 1976 before signing for Barnsley in December 1976. Between 1976 and 1979 he played 130 matches for the Yorkshire club and netted one goal. Collins ended his senior career at Kidderminster Harriers.

In 1979 Collins moved back to America, this time to play for the indoor Soccer team Baltimore Blast.

== Personal life and death ==
After football Collins moved back to Wales in the 1980s where he became a pub landlord running three pubs and a hotel all in Haverfordwest. In later life he had diabetes, and had to have both legs amputated before his death on 14 April 2020, aged 71.
