= Killing of David Wilkie =

1984 murder in Wales

David James Wilkie (9 July 1949 – 30 November 1984) was a Welsh taxi driver who was killed during the miners' strike in the United Kingdom, when two striking miners dropped a concrete block from a footbridge onto his taxi whilst he was driving a strike-breaking miner to work. The attack caused widespread revulsion at the extent of violence in the dispute. The two miners were convicted of murder but the charge was reduced to manslaughter on appeal, becoming a leading case on the issue of the difference between the two offences.

== Background ==
Wilkie was working in Treforest, Mid Glamorgan, as a taxi driver, driving a Ford Cortina for City Centre Cars, based in Bute Street, Cardiff. He was regularly engaged in driving non-striking miners to work, as the bitter industrial dispute had made them targets for physical retaliation by those miners who were on strike. The Merthyr Tydfil area was said to be the strongest in support of the strike of any mining area in Britain; it is situated in South Wales, where a large percentage of Britain's remaining coal mines were situated. There had not been much mass picketing in South Wales during the conflict, as there had been in many parts of England, because there had been so few strikebreakers.

== Killing ==
On 30 November 1984, Wilkie's fare was David Williams, who lived in Rhymney and worked at the Merthyr Vale mine, 6 miles (9.7 km) away. Wilkie was driving the same route as he had done for the previous ten days. He was accompanied by two police cars and a motorcycle outrider, and had just turned on to the A465 road north of Rhymney at the Rhymney Bridge roundabout, when two striking miners dropped a 46-pound (21 kg) concrete block from a bridge 27 feet (8.2 m) over the road. Wilkie died at the scene from multiple injuries; Williams escaped with minor injuries.

== Reaction ==
The incident led to a decrease in public support for the striking miners, and to an increase in the number of workers in other industries who crossed miners' picket lines (e.g. at power plants). The group Lesbians and Gays Support the Miners said that their collectors in London were abused as "murderers" after the incident.

Prime Minister Margaret Thatcher said, "My reaction is one of anger at what this had done to a family of a person only doing his duty and taking someone to work who wanted to go to work." Kim Howells, speaking for the South Wales National Union of Mineworkers, blamed the attack on the attempts to persuade miners to return to work. Arthur Scargill said he had been "deeply shocked by the tragedy" of Wilkie's death.

David Owen, the leader of the Social Democrats, called on all miners to return to work for one day on the following Monday as a "gut reaction" protest against the killing.

Labour Party leader Neil Kinnock was scheduled to appear at a Labour Party rally alongside Scargill in Stoke-on-Trent on the day of the tragedy. Kinnock's speech developed into an argument with some hecklers who saw him as having betrayed the NUM by failing to support the strike. Kinnock began by saying, "We meet here tonight in the shadow of an outrage." When interrupted, Kinnock accused the hecklers of "living like parasites off the struggle of the miners." As Kinnock went on to denounce the lack of the ballot, the violence against strikebreakers and the tactical approach of Scargill, he was asked by hecklers what he had done for the striking miners. Kinnock shouted back, "Well, I was not telling them lies. That's what I was not doing during that period." This was a thinly veiled attack on Scargill, whom he later admitted that he detested.

Wilkie lived with his fiancée Janice Reed, who was the mother of his two-year-old daughter and was pregnant with a baby who was born six weeks later. He also had a 12-year-old daughter and a five-year-old son by a previous partner. Funds were opened to help the family; among the donors was philanthropist Paul Getty. The Bishop of Llandaff led Wilkie's funeral service; he called for "some sort of moratorium" and a return to work by the miners in return for an impartial board to investigate conditions in the coal industry.

== Murder trial ==
The two men who caused Wilkie's death, Dean Hancock and Russell Shankland, were found guilty of murder by a majority verdict on 16 May 1985 (by which time the strike had ended) and sentenced to life imprisonment. A third man, Anthony Williams, who had been present on the bridge but was found to have actively discouraged them from dropping the concrete block, was acquitted. The life sentences caused an outcry among the striking miners, who felt that the death of Wilkie was not a deliberate act; the strike had ended by the time the verdict was brought in, but 700 miners at Merthyr Vale walked out on hearing the news.

Russell Shankland's solicitor was critical of Scargill's attitude. He referred to the strike as "a war" and said with regard to Scargill, "In that war there were generals, and they stood outside the law and they left Russell Shankland outside the law."

On appeal, their convictions were reduced to manslaughter, and their life sentences were replaced with eight-year prison terms, of which they would serve just over half. The Lord Chief Justice, Lord Lane, explained that the crime would be murder if the death was a "natural consequence" of the miners' actions, but the legal phrase "natural consequence" was potentially misleading without further explanation. The appeal verdict of guilty to manslaughter was upheld in the House of Lords, in the case R v Hancock. Hancock and Shankland were released on 30 November 1989, which was coincidentally the fifth anniversary of Wilkie's death.

== Aftermath ==
Kim Howells, the South Wales NUM official who commented on the killing of David Wilkie, later became a Member of parliament for the Labour Party and served as a minister in the Blair government and later became chair of the Intelligence and Security Committee, a committee of parliamentarians that oversees the work of Britain's intelligence and security agencies. In 2004 he said that when he heard that a taxi driver had been killed, he thought "hang on, we've got all those records we've kept over in the NUM offices, there's all those maps on the wall, we're gonna get implicated in this". He then destroyed "everything", because he feared a police raid on the union offices.
