= In Place of Fear =

British book about socialism

- Cover of the paperback First Edition
- Author: Aneurin Bevan
- Language: English
- Subject: Politics, Socialism, National Health Service
- Genre: Political philosophy
- Publisher: William Heinemann Ltd
- Publication date: 1952
- Publication place: United Kingdom
- Media type: Print (hardback)
- Pages: 201
- OCLC: 3618403

In Place of Fear is a book written by Aneurin Bevan, founder of the National Health Service. Published in 1952 by William Heinemann Ltd, the book was influential among the Labour Left and the Labour movement as a whole but was overshadowed by Anthony Crosland's The Future of Socialism, although Crosland referred to In Place of Fear as "the most widely read socialist book" of the period.

Serving as a semi-autobiographical text Bevan brings to great attention his life growing up in the mining towns of south Wales:

A young miner in a South Wales colliery, my concern was with one practical question, where does power lie in this particular state of Great Britain, and how can it be attained by the workers.

— Aneurin Bevan, In Place of Fear, p. 1

The book addresses health and housing - the areas for which Bevan had been primarily responsible as a minister - but goes beyond those limits to act as a distillation of Bevan's philosophy as it applied to economics, the nature of society, and much else besides. Considered highly quotable, the book is a central source for the beliefs of the pre-Benn Labour left.

== Content and structure ==
In Place of Fear comprises ten chapters covering a wide range of political and social themes. The chapter titles are: "Poverty, Property and Democracy"; "The Rôle of Parliament-Active or Passive?"; "Modern Man and Modern Society"; "Private or Collective Spending"; "A Free Health Service"; "The Invasion of Doubt"; "Social Tensions"; "World Leadership"; "Raw Materials, Scarcities and Priorities"; and "Democratic Socialism".

The book opens with "Poverty, Property and Democracy" as its first chapter, establishing Bevan's central thesis about the conflicting forces in society. The work serves both as a defence of the 1945–1951 Labour government's reforms and as a blueprint for Bevan's vision of a socialist society.

The chapters progress from fundamental political theory through practical governance issues to Bevan's healthcare philosophy. Chapter II examines "The Rôle of Parliament-Active or Passive?", discussing parliamentary democracy and representation. Chapters III and IV address "Modern Man and Modern Society" and "Private or Collective Spending", analysing the relationship between individual and collective action in contemporary politics. Chapter V, "A Free Health Service", outlines Bevan's blueprint for the NHS and counters arguments against universal healthcare. The remaining chapters tackle "The Invasion of Doubt", "Social Tensions", "World Leadership", and "Raw Materials, Scarcities and Priorities", before concluding with "Democratic Socialism".

== Ideology ==
Bevan, throughout the book, is a strong advocate for Democratic socialism, with the final chapter sharing the ideology's name. He states his belief that Democratic socialism has the only principles 'broadly applicable to the situation in which mankind now finds itself'. The work represents Bevan's unswerving belief that collective problems required collective solutions while remaining mindful at all times of how they affected the individual.

By extension of this he advocates for great levels of freedom of speech and expression, opposing concentration of newspaper ownership. On healthcare, Bevan argued that "a free Health Service is a triumphant example of the superiority of collective action and public initiative applied to a segment of society where commercial principles are seen at their worst".

The title of the book itself is an allusion to the idea that the National Health Service takes away the anxiety which might exist in a society where access to healthcare depends on one's ability to pay for it, and may also suggest that socialism offers peace of mind in contrast to the more prevalent capitalist leanings of Western democracies.

== Publication and reception ==
In Place of Fear was published in 1952 by William Heinemann Ltd in London, comprising 201 pages. The book received mixed contemporary reviews. According to The Times Literary Supplement, the book was a "dithyramb with meanderings into the many side-tracks of Mr Bevan's private and public experience".

Despite mixed critical reception, the book achieved significant readership and influence within the Labour movement. Anthony Crosland, though a political opponent on the Labour right, acknowledged it as "the most widely read socialist book" of its period. The book was described as "an important political document with a large bearing on future Labour Party policy at home and abroad".

== Historical context ==
The book was written during a period when Bevan's political position was weakening year by year as he failed to find a winning issue that would make use of his skills. It was published shortly after his resignation from the Labour government in April 1951 over the introduction of prescription charges and rearmament spending.

The book reflects the post-World War II political climate, addressing issues such as the tensions in global politics and the arms race that remained relevant beyond the 1950s.

== Academic reception and scholarly analysis ==
In Place of Fear has been extensively analysed in academic literature on British politics and healthcare policy. The British Journal of General Practice noted that Bevan "understood much of" the relationship between healthcare and social vulnerability when he wrote the book, describing it as establishing "a national health service which removed the fear that attended sickness among people who could not afford to pay for medical attention".

The work has been included in major academic collections, notably in the Policy Press reader Poverty, inequality and health in Britain: 1800-2000, which places extracts from the book alongside other significant British social and political texts from 1800 to 2000. The academic editors note that "the spirit of Nye Bevan's beliefs and the force with which he conveyed them continue to inspire those who defend the NHS today".

Michael Foot's authoritative two-volume biography of Bevan, Aneurin Bevan: A Biography (1961, 1973), devotes considerable attention to the writing and impact of In Place of Fear, describing Bevan's "publication in 1952 of In Place of Fear" as a key moment during his leadership of the "Bevanite Labour left". Foot, who succeeded Bevan as MP for Ebbw Vale, is considered to have written "one of the major political biographies of the last century".

== Legacy and modern political references ==
Although mostly remembered as an extension of his fight for the Health Service, it is also considered to be a statement of what British socialism should be.

The book has been frequently referenced by contemporary Labour politicians. In May 2023, Keir Starmer gave a major speech on NHS policy in which he explicitly referenced the book's title, stating: "In Place of Fear – that's what Nye Bevan called his book. And if people want to call me dewy-eyed, want to say I'm a romantic about the values of the NHS – I plead guilty." Starmer also quoted directly from Bevan's writing, referencing his belief that "illness is neither an indulgence for which people have to pay; nor an offence for which they should be penalised".

The book has been republished multiple times with forewords by prominent Labour figures. Jennie Lee, Bevan's wife, composed a foreword to the 1976 edition, describing how Bevan "regarded In Place of Fear as a series of shorthand notes on themes he planned to write about at greater length". Other editions have featured forewords by Neil Kinnock in 1978, Gordon Brown in 2008 to mark the sixtieth anniversary of the NHS, and Nick Thomas-Symonds in 2020, each seeking to interpret Bevan's message for their contemporary political context.

Contemporary political analysis continues to engage with the book's themes. Current Affairs magazine described it as "both an all-encompassing worldview and a primer for contemporary politics", noting that it "remains revolutionary in both its intent and application". The book continues to be cited by contemporary political commentators and remains in print, with the work continuing to influence discussions about healthcare policy and democratic socialism.
