= R v Hancock =

British case law

Regina v Reginald Dean Hancock and Russell Shankland
- Court: (Judicial Committee of the) House of Lords
- Decided: 27 February 1986
- Citation: 1985 UKHL 9; [1986] AC 455; [1986] 2 WLR 357; [1986] 1 All ER 641; 82 Cr App R 264
- Cases cited: R v Moloney [1985] AC 905
- Legislation cited: common law

Case history
- Prior actions: Crown Court at Cardiff (unreported); Appeal to the Court of Appeal: substituted (reduced) offence to manslaughter [1986] AC 455; [1985] 3 WLR 1014,
- Subsequent action: None

Court membership
- Judges sitting: Lord Scarman, Lord Keith of Kinkel, Lord Roskill, Lord Brightman, Lord Griffiths

Case opinions
- Substituted sentence to be upheld; appeal seeking reinstatement of murder conviction dismissed (a per curiam judgement)

Keywords
- Murder; manslaughter; intent; mens rea; whether obligatory for murder to give direction on importance of probability of death or serious injury

R v Hancock [1985] UKHL 9 is an English legal decision of the highest court setting out the relationship between foresight of consequences and intention in cases of murder. It refers to the case of the killing of David Wilkie. The defendants' stated intention had been to frighten a person, but another was killed. The law, as the judgement of the whole court (a per curiam decision) was held to hinge on the relationship between foresight of the range of results of taking a particular action and the result of that action which must include a specific direction or legal mention of considering the probability of death or serious injury resulting, and other directions which explain the difference between the offence of manslaughter and that of murder.

== Facts ==
During the 1984–1985 miners' strike, the defendants dropped a concrete block from a bridge with the later-stated intention of scaring a coal miner being taken to work in a taxi. Instead, the taxi driver, David Wilkie, was killed. During questioning, the defendants admitted intending to frighten the miner out of attending work, but denied an intention to kill or cause serious injury to him. At the trial, their offer to plead guilty to manslaughter was rejected by the prosecution, who pursued convictions for murder.

== Trial ==
The trial judge directed the jury per R v Moloney that

the prosecution case could be compressed into one question and answer, the question being "what else could a person who pushed or threw such objects have intended but to cause really serious bodily harm to the occupants of the car?"

The jury, after some deliberation, sought clarification because

the precise legal definitions regarding the committing of murder and manslaughter are causing dissent because of lack of knowledge, particularly with regard to intent and foreseeable consequences.

and the judge gave a further direction but did not expand on his previous guidance. Verdicts of guilty were returned and the defendants sentenced to life imprisonment.

== Appeals ==
The Court of Appeal found that the judge's use of the Moloney guidelines may have misled the jury as they had been given no guidance as to the weight to be given to the actual foresight of a consequence (i.e. death or serious bodily harm) in determining the intent to cause that consequence. It was ruled that this omission was fatal, as in Moloney it had been stated that

the probability of the consequence taken to have been foreseen must be little short of overwhelming before it will suffice to establish the necessary intent

Since this guidance had not been available to the jury, the Court substituted verdicts of manslaughter, and the prosecution then appealed.

The House of Lords reviewed the Moloney guidelines issued by itself, and cited the main principles that:

- The mental element in murder is a specific intent, the intent to kill or to inflict serious bodily harm, and nothing less suffices
- Foresight of consequences is no more than evidence of the existence of the intent; it must be considered, and its weight assessed, together with all the evidence in the case.
- Foresight does not necessarily imply the existence of intention, though it may be a fact from which when considered with all the other evidence a jury may think it right to infer the necessary intent
- The probability of the result of an act is an important matter for the jury to consider and can be critical in their determining whether the result was intended.

The court agreed with the Court of Appeal in deciding that the Moloney guidelines were defective in that the issue (test) of probability should specifically be addressed (mentioned) by the trial judge, and since that had not occurred in the present case, the prosecutor's appeal was dismissed, and the convictions for manslaughter stood.
