= Williams Medical Supplies =

Williams Medical Supplies Ltd
- Type: Private company
- Industry: Healthcare Supplies and Services
- Founded: 1986
- Headquarters: Rhymney, Wales
- Products: Medical equipment, Medical consumables, Pharmaceuticals
- Number of employees: 160+
- Website: wms.co.uk

Williams Medical Supplies Ltd (WMS) is a Wales-based manufacturer and retailer of medical products to the primary care and secondary care markets. It is the largest supplier to general practice in the United Kingdom with a portfolio of products ranging from surgical instruments to pharmaceuticals. Its Medical Services division undertakes testing and calibration of medical equipment, health and safety audits, and electrical PAT testing.

Founded in 1986, the company is based in Rhymney, south Wales and employs more than 160 people at its head office and in the field. Williams Medical Supplies was voted one of the Best 100 Small Companies to Work for in 2005 and has achieved Investors in People Status.

In August 2014, WMS was subject of an industry award for customer service. In 2009, WMS was ranked at number 69 in the Sunday Times Deloitte Buyout Track 100 which ranks Britain's top private equity-backed companies with the fastest-growing profits over the previous two-year period.

In August 2026 a sinkhole was discovered from a failing culvert that carries the Rhymney River. This impacted the car park and access route used by WMS, but responsibility for resolution falls to one or more other organisations.
