= Tredegar Medical Aid Society =

South Wales medical aid self-help association

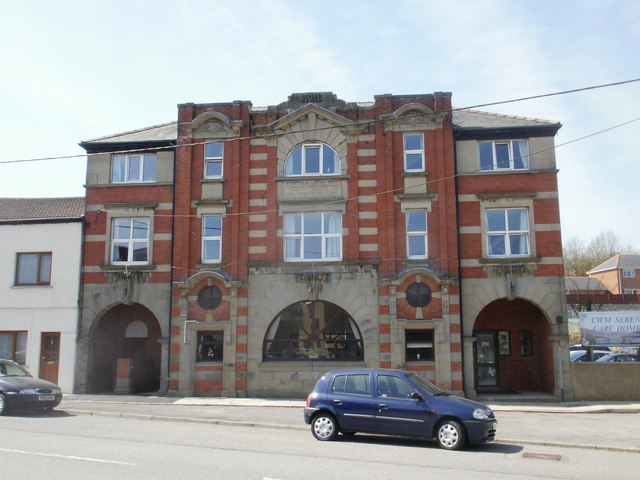
Tredegar's Central Surgery was built by the Society in 1911

Tredegar Medical Aid Society was founded in Tredegar in the historic county of Monmouthshire in South East Wales. In return for contributions from its members it provided health care free at the point of use. The society contributed the model which established the British National Health Service. According to Colin Ward, the model had "evolved from the vast network of friendly societies and mutual aid organisations that had sprung up through working class self-help in the 19th century."

== History ==
In 1890, the Tredegar Workmen's Medical Aid and Sick Relief Fund was formed by a merger of a large number of local benevolent societies in Tredegar, including one society which provided medical benefits and funeral expenses to its 3,000 members.

The local Cottage Hospital was established in 1904 following a proposal made at the society in 1901. The hospital's land had been funded by Lord Tredegar after a separate committee of thirty had been formed to organise the hospital's establishment. The construction costs were paid by the Tredegar Iron and Coal Company and other local philanthropists, whilst the running of the hospital was underwritten by the ironworkers. Each worker agreed to contribute a halfpenny per week, and in 1909 this was increased to a penny per week.

By June 1911 the society was well regarded nationally. A delegation which included Sir Arthur Markham Bt. and T. Richards MP concluded that "the Tredegar Workmen's Medical Aid and Sick Relief Fund was far in advance and more beneficial in respect to its members than any of the other societies." The visit had been organised because of the 1911 Invalidity Bill, which increased the rights of workers in the event of them being unable to work. The Tredegar society made large changes that year as the new legislation meant they had to stop giving sick pay of two shillings per week. The society converted itself into a benevolent society, but substantially retained its aims. It could now claim money from the Government to supplement its members' contributions.

In the same year the society employed Dr ETH Davies as their lead medic, and the society became the Tredegar Workmen's Medical Aid Society. Dr Davies was to be a key part of the society for the next 38 years. He was said to be the most qualified medical person in Wales when he won a ballot for his appointment. Dr Davies won due to grassroots support: he achieved 2,584 votes against 1,804 votes for his competitor.

In 1915, the Medical Aid Society appointed Walter Conway as its secretary. The development of the society's work is attributed to the energy and commitment of Conway, who served as its secretary until his death in 1933. The Medical Society was already employing doctors under its Medical Supertendant, but it also went on to open offices and a dentists' and a central surgery.

== Expansion ==
Conway enabled the Society to provide medical services to 20,000 local inhabitants. By 1925 the society purchased the redundant Palace cinema and converted it into an additional surgery, as well as establishing space for their own dental mechanic.

The society employed Dr A.J. Cronin, who depicted the Society in his novel The Citadel. There were similar societies in the South Wales valleys and in England. It was the model that Aneurin Bevan used for the National Health Service while he was Minister of Health in the post-war Labour government.

== Legacy ==
By 1933 the Society was supplying the medical needs of 95% of the local population. The society employed five doctors, two dentists with a mechanic each, pharmacy dispensers and assistants, and a nurse. Not only did the society see to the medical expenses, but it also provided good wages and conditions for its staff. The doctors were allowed some private work, which again was a model followed within the National Health Service when it was established just over a decade after Conway died.

In 1948, the society began to be a victim of its own success when Aneurin Bevan, who by then was not only the local MP but also the Minister of Health, launched the National Health Service. When members of the society asked Bevan if the society could continue to operate, albeit within the NHS, he told them "You have shown us the way and by your very efficiency you have brought about your own cessation."

Demand for the Tredegar scheme fell when the NHS was launched, but the society still continued to fulfil what remained of its role. It tried for a while to continue to fund private care for its members, but abandoned this as unaffordable.

In 1994 the society was wound up. It still had 114 members who were paid 18p each week towards their medical expenses. The society's remaining funds were contributed to the local hospital.

== See also ==
- History of public health in the United Kingdom#Contributory schemes
