= Aneurin Bevan =

Welsh politician (1897–1960)

The Right Honourable Aneurin Bevan
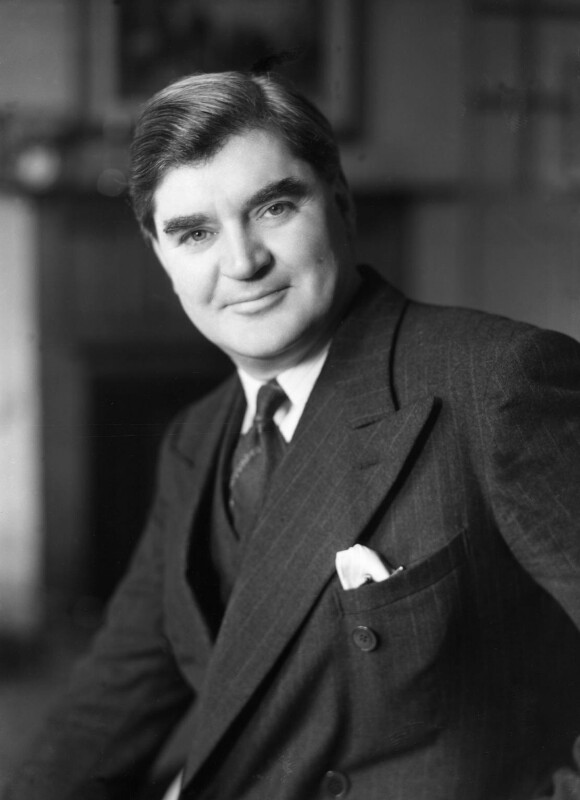
- Bevan in 1943

Deputy Leader of the Labour Party Deputy Leader of the Opposition
- In office 24 October 1959 – 6 July 1960
- Leader: Hugh Gaitskell
- Preceded by: Jim Griffiths
- Succeeded by: George Brown

Shadow Foreign Secretary
- In office 27 November 1956 – 6 July 1960
- Leader: Hugh Gaitskell
- Preceded by: Alfred Robens
- Succeeded by: Denis Healey

Shadow Colonial Secretary
- In office 15 February 1956 – 27 November 1956
- Leader: Hugh Gaitskell
- Preceded by: Jim Griffiths
- Succeeded by: James Callaghan

Shadow Minister of Labour and National Service
- In office 15 July 1955 – 15 February 1956
- Leader: Clement Attlee; Hugh Gaitskell
- Succeeded by: George Brown

Minister of Labour and National Service
- In office 17 January 1951 – 23 April 1951
- Prime Minister: Clement Attlee
- Preceded by: George Isaacs
- Succeeded by: Alf Robens

Minister of Health
- In office 5 August 1945 – 17 January 1951
- Prime Minister: Clement Attlee
- Preceded by: Henry Willink
- Succeeded by: Hilary Marquand

Member of Parliament for Ebbw Vale
- In office 30 May 1929 – 6 July 1960
- Preceded by: Evan Davies
- Succeeded by: Michael Foot

Personal details
- Born: 15 November 1897 Tredegar, Monmouthshire (historic), Wales
- Died: 6 July 1960 (aged 62) Chesham, Buckinghamshire, England
- Party: Labour
- Spouse: Jennie Lee (m. 1934)
- Education: Central Labour College, London
- Aneurin Bevan's voice Bevan on the problems facing the National Health Service since its implementation Recorded 6 October 1949

Aneurin "Nye" Bevan (/əˈnaɪrɪn ˈbɛvən/; Welsh: [aˈnəɨ.rɪn ˈbɛvan]; 15 November 1897 – 6 July 1960) was a Welsh Labour Party politician, noted for spearheading the creation of the British National Health Service during his tenure as Minister of Health in Clement Attlee's government. He is also known for his wider contribution to the founding of the British welfare state. He was first elected as MP for Ebbw Vale in 1929, and used his Parliamentary platform to make a number of influential criticisms of Winston Churchill and his government during the Second World War. Before entering Parliament, Bevan was involved in miners' union politics and was a leading figure in the 1926 general strike. Bevan is widely regarded as one of the most influential left-wing politicians in British history.

Raised in Monmouthshire, in modern day Blaenau Gwent, by a Welsh working-class family, he was the son of a coal miner and left school at 14. Bevan first worked as a miner during his teens where he became involved in local miners' union politics. He was elected head of his Miners' Lodge when aged 19, where he frequently railed against management. He joined the Labour Party and attended Central Labour College in London. On his return to South Wales he struggled to find work, remaining unemployed for nearly three years before gaining employment as a union official, which led to him becoming a leading figure in the 1926 general strike.

In 1928, Bevan won a seat on Monmouthshire County Council and he was elected as the MP for Ebbw Vale the following year. He served as an MP for 31 years. In Parliament, he became a vocal critic of numerous other politicians from all parties, particularly Winston Churchill and David Lloyd George. After the war, Bevan was chosen as the Minister of Health in Clement Attlee's new Labour government, becoming the youngest member of the cabinet at 47, with his remit also including housing. Inspired by the Tredegar Medical Aid Society in his hometown in South Wales, Bevan led the campaign for a National Health Service to provide medical care free at point-of-need across the UK, regardless of wealth. Despite resistance from opposition parties and the British Medical Association, the National Health Service Act 1946 was passed and launched in 1948, nationalising more than 2,500 hospitals within the United Kingdom.

Bevan was named Minister of Labour in 1951, but resigned after two months in office, when the Attlee government proposed the introduction of prescription charges for dental and vision care and decided to transfer funds from the National Insurance Fund to pay for rearmament. His influence waned after his departure, although a left-wing group within the party became known as "Bevanites". Attlee and Labour were ousted from power in a snap election held six months after Bevan's resignation, but Attlee continued on as Labour Party Leader. When Attlee retired from the leadership in 1955, Bevan unsuccessfully contested the party leadership with Hugh Gaitskell, but was appointed Shadow Colonial Secretary and later Shadow Foreign Secretary. In 1959, he was elected Deputy Leader of the Labour Party and held the post for a year until his death in 1960 from stomach cancer, at the age of 62. His death led to "an outpouring of national mourning". In 2004, more than 44 years after his death, he was voted first in a list of 100 Welsh Heroes, having been credited for his contribution to the founding of the welfare state in the UK.

== Early life ==
Aneurin Bevan was born on 15 November 1897 at 32 Charles Street in Tredegar, Monmouthshire, a working-class mining town, where an estimated 90 per cent of the town's inhabitants relied on the local mines for employment. The town was situated in the South Wales Valleys and was on the northern edge of the South Wales coalfield. He was the son of coal miner David Bevan and Phoebe (née Prothero), a seamstress. David Bevan was born in Tredegar but his family had originally hailed from Carmarthenshire, and he followed his own father into the mines, starting work at 5:30am each day and returning home late in the evening. He was adept at construction and added several modern features when the family moved to 7 Charles Street, installing the first gas stove in the street, an inside toilet and running hot water.

Both Bevan's parents were Nonconformists: his father was a Baptist and his mother a Methodist, although he became an atheist. He was converted to socialism by the writings of Robert Blatchford in The Clarion and began attending meetings of the Independent Labour Party following the founding of its branch in Tredegar. It was around this time that he first "reject[ed] his chapel upbringing" and became an atheist. He was a member of the Honourable Society of Cymmrodorion and wrote his own poems, one of which won an inter-chapel eisteddfod. Aneurin's mother was also from Tredegar, but had English roots: her grandfather was from Hereford. Bevan's maternal grandfather John was a blacksmith who had moved to Tredegar from Hay-on-Wye to work in the Bedwellty mines.

The couple had ten children altogether—six boys and four girls—although four died in infancy and one died at the age of eight. Aneurin Bevan attended Sirhowy Elementary School, where he achieved little. He developed a severe stammer as a child and, according to his younger sister Myfanwy, became "a lonely chap", due to the need to shy away from the attention it brought him.

His father died by pneumoconiosis (a lung condition caused by long term inhalation of coal dust) but no compensation was paid to him, as it was not classed as an industrial disease under the Workmen's Compensation Act.

== Working life as a miner ==
At the age of 13, in his last months of schooling, he worked as a butcher's boy at a local store. He worked at the butcher's for several months before leaving school, instead working in the local Ty-Trist Colliery. There he earned around ten shillings per week with most going to his parents to help support the family. He began attending fortnightly meetings of the local Plebs' League where he studied, among other things, Marxism. Bevan also joined the Tredegar branch of the South Wales Miners' Federation and became a trade union activist: he was head of his local Miners' Lodge at 19 years of age. He was called up for service during the First World War, and was briefly arrested when his sister Blodwen burnt his conscription papers and he failed to report for duty. Bevan appeared in court but was cleared when he produced confirmation that he suffered from nystagmus.

Bevan became a well-known local orator and was seen by his employers, the Tredegar Iron and Coal Company, as a troublemaker. The manager of the colliery found an excuse to get him dismissed. With the support of the Miners' Federation, the case was judged as one of victimisation and the company was forced to re-employ him. He and his brother Billy did eventually leave Ty-Tryst and worked at the Bedwellty pit, but were forced to move again after a disagreement with the site's deputy manager over Bevan reporting information to the miner's inspector. The pair went to work at Whitworth Colliery, but fell foul of management when Bevan refused to use cheaper second-hand timber as he deemed it unsafe. He was later fired for refusing to unload, and successfully challenged the motion but was moved to Pochin, generally considered a punishment due to the poor site conditions.

1919 saw the foundation of the Tredegar Labour Party and Bevan was selected as one of four Labour delegates to contest the West Ward in the Tredegar Urban District election. Although he was defeated, he gained attention from his peers and he won a scholarship to the Central Labour College in London, sponsored by the South Wales Miners' Federation. There, he spent two years studying economics, politics and history. He read Marxism at the college and was a brief follower of Noah Ablett, developing his left-wing political outlook. Reciting long passages by William Morris with the help of an elocution tutor, Bevan gradually began to overcome the stammer that he had since childhood. Bevan remained at the college until 1921, attending at a time when a number of his contemporaries from South Wales, including Jim Griffiths, were also students at the college. Some historians have questioned how influential the college was on his political development. He was not, apparently, one of the most diligent students, and found it difficult to follow an organised routine, including arising early for breakfast.

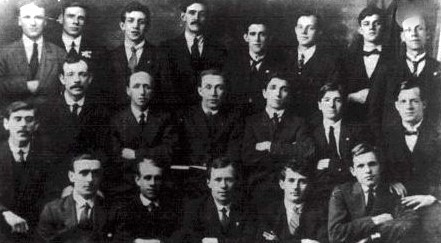
The Tredegar Query Club by friends including Aneurin Bevan and Walter Conway. Conway is in the middle of the picture. Aneurin is second from right on the back row and his brother Billy is second right on front row.

Bevan was one of the founding members of the "Query Club" with his brother Billy and Walter Conway. Conway was a local miner who had been elected to the Bedwellty Board of Guardians and offered Bevan advice on overcoming his stammer, stating "if you can't say it, you don't know it". Bevan followed his advice, often practising his speeches to his friends to perfect his speech and wording, and remarked that Conway's words were the "best advice I ever had". The Query club started in 1920 or 1921 and they met in Tredegar. They would collect money weekly for any member who needed it. The club intended to break the hold that the Tredegar Iron and Coal Company had on the town by becoming members of pivotal groups in the community.

Upon returning home in 1921, he found that the Tredegar Iron and Coal Company refused to re-employ him. Bevan ended up in a fist fight with a group of miners who refused to strike over his rejection. Apart from a six-week period as a labourer for Tredegar Council, he did not find work until 1924 and his employer, the Bedwellty Colliery, closed down ten months later. Bevan then endured another year of unemployment, the family surviving on his sister's wages, when his unemployment benefit was stopped due to her income, and his father's sick pay. In February 1925, his father died of pneumoconiosis, an illness caused by the inhalation of coal dust. In 1926 he found work as a paid union official. His wage of £5 a week was paid by the members of the local Miners' Lodge. His new job arrived in time for him to head the local miners against the colliery companies during the General Strike. When the strike started on 3 May 1926, Bevan soon emerged as one of the leaders of the South Wales miners. The miners remained on strike for six months. Bevan was largely responsible for the distribution of strike pay in Tredegar and the formation of the Council of Action, an organisation that helped to raise money and provide food for the miners.

== Parliament ==
=== MP for Ebbw Vale ===
In 1928, Bevan won a seat on Monmouthshire County Council in the Tredegar Central Division. He lost the seat in 1931, but regained it in 1932 before deciding against seeking re-election in 1934. With his success in 1928, he was picked as the Labour Party candidate for Ebbw Vale (displacing the sitting MP Evan Davies), and easily held the seat at the 1929 General Election. Bevan gained more than twice the votes of Liberal candidate William Griffiths, receiving 20,000 votes to Griffiths' 8,000. In keeping with his background, Bevan described his initial thoughts on the House of Commons as a shrine to "the most conservative of all religions – ancestor worship". In Parliament, he became noticed as a harsh critic of those he felt opposed the working man and woman. His targets included the Conservative Winston Churchill and the Liberal David Lloyd George, as well as Ramsay MacDonald and Margaret Bondfield from his own Labour party (he targeted the latter for her unwillingness to increase unemployment benefits). He had solid support from his constituency, being one of the few Labour MPs to be unopposed in the 1931 General Election, and this support grew through the 1930s and the period of the Great Depression.

Soon after Bevan entered Parliament, he was briefly attracted to Smethwick Labour MP Oswald Mosley's arguments, becoming one of the 17 signatories of the Mosley Memorandum in the context of the MacDonald government's repeated economic crises, including the doubling of unemployment levels. In January 1931, Bevan wrote a letter to the government on behalf of the Mosley group, raising concerns over its "failure to deal with unemployment". Mosley broke from the Labour Party in early 1931 to form the New Party, but Bevan refused to defect and instead announced that he had no intention of leaving the Labour Party. By 1932, Mosley's New Party had migrated from the left over to the far-right of British politics and was rebranded as the British Union of Fascists. Bevan's past association with Mosley would be used against him in subsequent years by his political rivals.

He married fellow Socialist MP Jennie Lee in 1934, after they met in London. Described as "more left-wing than Nye", Lee became a considerable influence on Bevan's political career. They were early supporters of the socialists in the Spanish Civil War, and Bevan visited the country in 1938. In 1936 he joined the board of the new socialist newspaper Tribune. His agitations for a united socialist front of all parties of the left (including the Communist Party of Great Britain) led to his expulsion from the Labour Party from March to November 1939 (along with Stafford Cripps, C. P. Trevelyan and three others). Bevan and Cripps had previously been threatened with disciplinary action by the party for sharing a stage with a Communist speaker, and all party members were threatened with expulsion if they were associated with the Popular Front. Bevan and another expelled MP, George Strauss, appealed against the decision. Bevan was readmitted to the party on 20 December 1939, after agreeing "to refrain from conducting or taking part in campaigns in opposition to the declared policy of the Party".

He strongly criticised the National Government's rearmament plans in the face of the rise of Nazi Germany, saying to the Labour conference in autumn 1937:

If the immediate international situation is used as an excuse to get us to drop our opposition to the rearmament programme of the Government, the next phase must be that we must desist from any industrial or political action that may disturb national unity in the face of Fascist aggression. Along that road is endless retreat, and at the end of it a voluntary totalitarian state with ourselves erecting the barbed wire around. You cannot collaborate, you cannot accept the logic of collaboration on a first class issue like rearmament, and at the same time evade the implications of collaboration all along the line when the occasion demands it.

His opposition to the Labour leadership's approach was partly based on his view that the leadership of the Labour Party was not demanding assurances from the Government on its foreign policy as a price for the party's support for re-armament as expressed in his speech to the Bournemouth Conference of that year:

...we should say to the country we are prepared to make whatever sacrifices are necessary, to give whatever arms are necessary to fight Fascist powers and in order to consolidate world peace...

The Labour conference voted to drop its opposition to rearmament. When Winston Churchill said that the Labour Party should refrain from giving Adolf Hitler the impression that Britain was divided, Bevan rejected this as sinister:

The fear of Hitler is to be used to frighten the workers of Britain into silence. In short Hitler is to rule Britain by proxy. If we accept the contention that the common enemy is Hitler and not the British capitalist class, then certainly Churchill is right. But it means abandonment of the class struggle and the subservience of the British workers to their own employers.

=== Opposition to the war-time government ===
By March 1938, Bevan was writing in Tribune that Churchill's warnings about German intentions for Czechoslovakia were "a diapason of majestic harmony" compared to Prime Minister Neville Chamberlain's "thin, listless trickle". Bevan now called unsuccessfully for a Popular Front coalition against fascism under the leadership of the Labour Party, including even anti-fascist Tories. When the government introduced voluntary national service in December 1938, Bevan argued that Labour should demand the nationalisation of the armaments industry, support the democratic government of Spain and sign an Anglo-Soviet pact in return for its support. When Labour supported the government's scheme with no such conditions, Bevan denounced Labour for imploring the people on recruiting platforms to put themselves under the leadership of their opponents. The Military Training Act 1939 reintroduced conscription six months later, and Bevan joined the rest of the Labour Party in opposing it, calling it "the complete abandonment of any hope of a successful struggle against the weight of wealth in Great Britain". He emphasised that the government had no arguments to persuade young men to fight "except merely in another squalid attempt to defend themselves against the redistribution of international swag".

In August 1939 came the Molotov–Ribbentrop Pact, a non-aggression pact between the Nazi and Soviet governments that shocked democratic governments around the world. In Parliament, Bevan argued that this was the logical outcome of the government's foreign policy. He wanted the war to be not just a fight against fascism but a war for socialism. Bevan was relieved that the country had united against Nazi Germany in the fight against fascism to provide a common enemy away from the working class. He was a strong critic of Chamberlain, arguing that his old rival Winston Churchill should become prime minister.

During the Second World War he was one of the main leaders of the left in the Commons, opposing the wartime Coalition government. Bevan opposed the heavy censorship imposed on radio and newspapers and wartime Defence Regulation 18B, which gave the Home Secretary the powers to intern citizens. Bevan called for the nationalisation of the coal industry and advocated the opening of a Second Front in Western Europe to help the Soviet Union in its fight with Germany. In one of his most noted speeches made against Churchill, he railed that the prime minister "wins debate after debate and loses battle after battle". Churchill would later label Bevan "a squalid nuisance". Churchill was a frequent target of Bevan's, who already held a dislike of him following his intervention in the Tonypandy riots and the 1926 United Kingdom general strike which Bevan considered heavy handed. Bevan believed that the key to the war was the involvement of the USSR and considered Churchill too focused on the intervention of the United States. Bevan also feared that allowing Churchill to continue unopposed and unchallenged in Parliament during the war would leave him almost unbeatable for the Labour Party in future elections. Historian Max Hastings described Bevan's role in Parliament during the war as "his figures were accurate but his scorn was at odds with the spirit of the moment—full of gratitude, as was the prime minister". His fierce opposition made him unpopular with some portions of the public at the time; his wife later described how the couple would frequently receive parcels filled with excrement at their home.

Bevan was critical of the leadership of the British Army, which he felt was class bound and inflexible. After General Neil Ritchie's retreat across Cyrenaica early in 1942 and his disastrous defeat by General Erwin Rommel at Gazala, Bevan made one of his most memorable speeches in the Commons in support of a motion of censure against the Churchill government.

"The Prime Minister must realise that in this country there is a taunt on everyone's lips that if Rommel had been in the British Army he would still have been a sergeant ... There is a man in the British Army who flung 150,000 men across the Ebro in Spain, Michael Dunbar. He is at present a sergeant ... He was Chief of Staff in Spain, he won the Battle of the Ebro, and he is a sergeant."

Dunbar had been recommended for a commission, but rejected it himself to remain with his unit.

Bevan was subject to further disciplinary action in 1944, when he deliberately voted against Labour's stance on new defence regulations. He also voiced criticism of trade union leaders, which drew complaints from both the Miners' Federation and the Trades Union Congress. An administrative committee voted 71 to 60 in favour of retaining Bevan as an MP, although it was announced that party discipline was to be strengthened in future.

He believed that the Second World War would give Britain the opportunity to create "a new society". He often quoted an 1855 passage from Karl Marx that was published in The New York Times in 1865: "The redeeming feature of war is that it puts a nation to the test. As exposure to the atmosphere reduces all mummies to instant dissolution, so war passes supreme judgment upon social systems that have outlived their vitality." At the beginning of the 1945 general election campaign, Bevan told his audience that his goal was to eliminate any opposition to the Labour programme: "We have been the dreamers, we have been the sufferers, now we are the builders. We enter this campaign at this general election, not merely to get rid of the Tory majority. We want the complete political extinction of the Tory Party, and twenty-five years of Labour Government."

== Government ==
The 1945 general election resulted in a landslide victory for the Labour Party, giving it a large enough majority to allow the implementation of the party's manifesto commitments and to introduce a programme of far-reaching social reforms, that were collectively dubbed the "Welfare State". These reforms were achieved in the face of great financial difficulty following the war. The new Prime Minister, Clement Attlee, appointed Bevan as Minister of Health, with a remit that also covered housing. Thus, the responsibility for instituting a new and comprehensive National Health Service, as well as tackling the country's severe post-war housing shortage, was given to Bevan, the youngest member of Attlee's Cabinet in his first ministerial position at the age of 47. Although described in The Times as "an outstanding back-bench critic" and "one of (Labour's) most brilliant members in debate", his appointment was regarded as a relative surprise, given his previous disciplinary issues. Bevan had clashed frequently with Attlee during his time as an MP, believing that the Labour leader failed to apply enough pressure on the Tory government during the war. He had also had disputes with some of Attlee's closest allies, Ernest Bevin and Herbert Morrison, who were appointed Foreign Secretary and Leader of the House respectively. However, Attlee commented that Bevan was "starting with me with a clean sheet" following his appointment. Bevan tested this newfound solidarity early on by arriving to a royal banquet at St James's Palace wearing a navy lounge suit. He earned a rebuke from Attlee, but Bevan contended that his Welsh mining constituency did not send him to Parliament to "dress up", and he declined to wear formal attire at further Buckingham Palace functions.

=== Minister of Health (1945–1951) ===
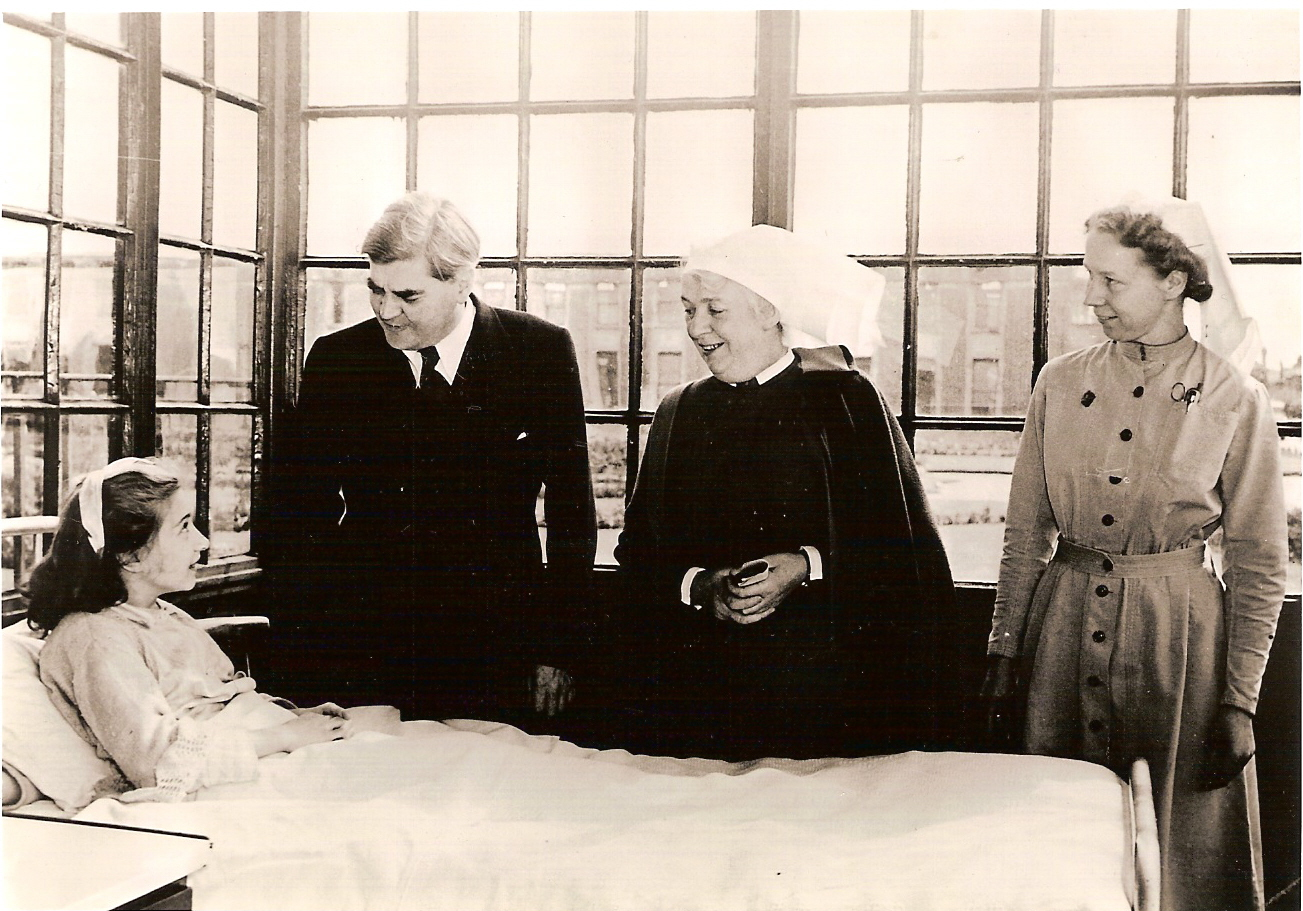
Bevan talking to a patient at Park Hospital, Manchester, the day the NHS came into being

The free National Health Service was paid for directly through public money. Bevan had been inspired by the Tredegar Medical Aid Society in his hometown, where residents would pay a subscription to enable all subscribers and their dependants to have free access to medical services such as nursing or dental care. This system proved so popular that 20,000 people supported the organisation during the 1930s. Government income was increased for the welfare state expenditure by a large increase in marginal tax rates for wealthy business owners in particular, as part of what the Labour government largely saw as the redistribution of the wealth created by the working-class from the owners of large-scale industry to the workers. Having been a member of the Cottage Hospital Management Committee around 1928 and serving as chairman in 1929–30, Bevan had received an insight into the management of health services by local authorities, which proved to be a bedrock of his work in founding the National Health Service.

The collective principle asserts that ... no society can legitimately call itself civilised if a sick person is denied medical aid because of lack of means.

— Aneurin Bevan, In Place of Fear, p. 100

On the "appointed day", 5 July 1948, Bevan's National Health Service Act 1946 came into force. On the day, Bevan attended a ceremony at the Park Hospital, Trafford (now Trafford General), at which he symbolically received the keys to the hospital. The scheme was achieved having overcome political opposition from both the Conservative Party and from within his own party. Confrontation with the British Medical Association (BMA) was led by Charles Hill, who published a letter in the British Medical Journal describing Bevan as "a complete and uncontrolled dictator". Members of the BMA had dubbed him the "Tito of Tonypandy". They threatened to derail the National Health Service scheme before it had even begun, as medical practitioners continued to withhold their support just months before the launch of the service. After eighteen months of ongoing dispute between the Ministry of Health and the BMA, Bevan finally managed to win over the support of the vast majority of the medical profession by offering a couple of minor concessions, including allowing consultants to keep their own private practices and continuing to allow doctors to be paid in capitation fees rather than salaries, but without compromising the fundamental principles of his National Health Service proposals. At a dinner in late 1955 or early 1956 to celebrate the publication of the Guillebaud Report into NHS costs Bevan remarked to Julian Tudor Hart "ultimately I had to stuff their mouths with gold" about his handling of the consultants. This is often quoted as "I stuffed their mouths with gold". Some 2,688 voluntary and municipal hospitals in England and Wales were nationalised and came under Bevan's supervisory control as Health Minister. Two of the key elements of Bevan's proposals were this nationalisation of the hospital services and the abolition of the sale and purchase of goodwill by general practitioners. The former aimed to provide a uniform standard of consultant led care and expertise throughout the country and to replace the patchwork of voluntary and municipal hospitals which existed at that point. The latter – sale and purchase of goodwill – often placed new entrants to the GP profession under large amounts of debt. Along with this, the Medical Practices Committee was to oversee the distribution of GP practices – a proposal which the previous Coalition Minister had withdrawn after opposition from the British Medical Association.

Bevan said:

The National Health Service and the Welfare State have come to be used as interchangeable terms, and in the mouths of some people as terms of reproach. Why this is so it is not difficult to understand, if you view everything from the angle of a strictly individualistic competitive society. A free health service is pure Socialism and as such it is opposed to the hedonism of capitalist society.

— Aneurin Bevan, In Place of Fear, p. 81

Conservative opposition of the National Health Service scheme feared that the sudden access to free health care would be overrun. In its early stages this proved true, as the service went vastly over budget in its inaugural year, and Attlee was forced to make a radio address to the nation in an attempt to limit the strain on the system. Bevan countered that the initial overspending was down to years of underinvestment in the British medical system prior to the Second World War: by the start of the 1950s, the early overspending had come to an end.

=== Housing reform ===
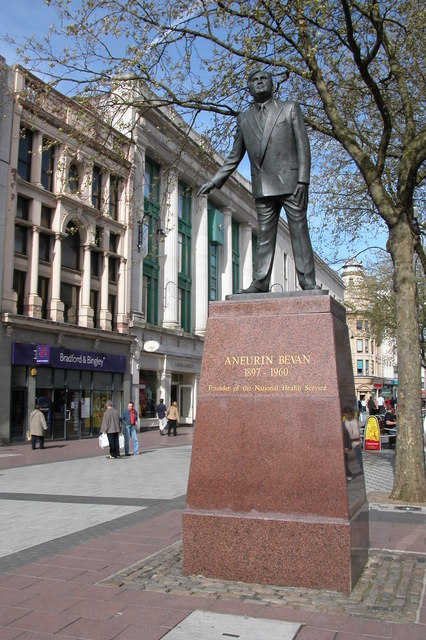
Statue of Bevan in Cardiff by Robert Thomas

When Bevan was made a minister in 1945, he envisaged the social housing sector as a housing service similar to the National Health Service, ensuring that everyone had access to decent and affordable homes, with people still having the option to live in owner occupation or the private sector if they so chose (with grants made available to owner-occupiers and private landlords to bring dwellings up to decent standards). The removal of the criteria of "working class" from local authority housing provision was seen as a first step, widening access to the council housing that was becoming an ever larger part of the UK housing stock and which made up a majority of new homes built after the war. The aim was to create new homes and communities with a place for all sections of society :

We should try to introduce in our modern villages and towns what was always the lovely feature of English and Welsh villages, where the doctor, the grocer, the butcher and the farm labourer all lived in the same street. I believe that is essential for the full life of citizen ... to see the living tapestry of a mixed community.

— Aneurin Bevan, Parliament speech, 1949

Substantial bombing damage, with over 700,000 homes needing repair in London alone, and the continued existence of pre-war slums in many parts of the country made the task of housing reform particularly challenging for Bevan. Indeed, these factors, exacerbated by post-war restrictions on the availability of building materials and skilled labour, collectively served to limit Bevan's achievements in this area. Bevan was also limited due to his desire for new homes to be bigger and of better quality than the ones they were being built to replace, based on the recommendations of a 1943 report by the Dudley Committee, and a shortage of skilled workers to undertake the work. 1946 saw the completion of 55,600 new homes; this rose to 139,600 in 1947 and 227,600 in 1948. While this was not an insignificant achievement – the 850,000 homes built in the four years immediately after the war ended was the biggest housing programme ever introduced – Bevan's rate of house-building was exceeded by his Conservative (indirect) successor, Harold Macmillan, who was able to complete some 300,000 new homes a year as Minister for Housing in the 1950s. These numbers were reached by lowering the quality standards originally put forward by Bevan, with council houses featuring gardens being largely dropped in favour of tower blocks and flats. Macmillan was also able to concentrate full-time on the housing crisis, instead of being obliged, like Bevan, to combine his housing portfolio with that for Health (which for Bevan took the higher priority: he once stated tongue-in-cheek that he devoted "five minutes a week to housing").

At a party rally in 1948, during a speech, Bevan stated: "That is why no amount of cajolery, and no attempts at ethical or social seduction, can eradicate from my heart a deep burning hatred for the Tory Party that inflicted those bitter experiences on me. So far as I am concerned they are lower than vermin. They condemned millions of first-class people to semi-starvation." The comment inspired the creation of the Vermin Club by angry Conservatives, who attacked Bevan for years for the metaphor. Labour Party deputy leader Herbert Morrison complained that Bevan's attack had backfired, for his words "did much more to make the Tories work and vote ... than Conservative Central Office could have done". It was later claimed that his words had cost Labour more than two million votes.

In 1951, with the retirement of Ernest Bevin, Bevan was a leading candidate for Foreign Secretary. Prime Minister Attlee rejected Bevan in favour of Herbert Morrison because he distrusted Bevan's personality. In his biography of Bevan, John Campbell wrote: "Bevan's impetuous temperament, undiplomatic tone and reputation as an extreme left-winger combined to make the Foreign Office seem the last place a prudent Prime Minister would think of putting him at any time. His 'vermin' speech still resonated: imagination shuddered at a repetition of that on the international stage."

=== Minister of Labour and National Service (1951) ===
Bevan was instead appointed Minister of Labour in January 1951 in place of George Isaacs. The move was seen by some as a sideways or backwards step, although a potential rearmament programme was expected to make the post of future importance. During his tenure, Bevan helped to secure a deal for railwaymen which provided them with a significant pay increase. However, three months after his appointment, Hugh Gaitskell introduced a proposal of prescription charges for dental care and spectacles—created to save a potential £25m to meet the financial demands imposed by the Korean War. An infuriated Bevan stated that he would never be a member of a government that imposed charges on the National Health Service. The Labour MP David Marquand has stated that the savings were introduced by Gaitskell simply to "impose his will" upon Bevan who he saw as a political rival. Bevan resigned from his position two weeks later, stating both the proposed changes and the increase in military expenditure that necessitated the need for such proposals. Two other ministers, John Freeman and Harold Wilson, resigned at the same time. Bevan received unanimous support for his actions from his local Labour constituency leaders.

Later the same year, the Labour Party were defeated at the general election. After Bevan left the Health ministry in 1951 he could never regain his level of success and feuded with fellow Labour leaders, using his strong political base as a weapon. Historian Kenneth O. Morgan says: "Bevan alone kept the flag of left-wing socialism aloft throughout—which gave him a matchless authority amongst the constituency parties and in party conference".

== Opposition ==
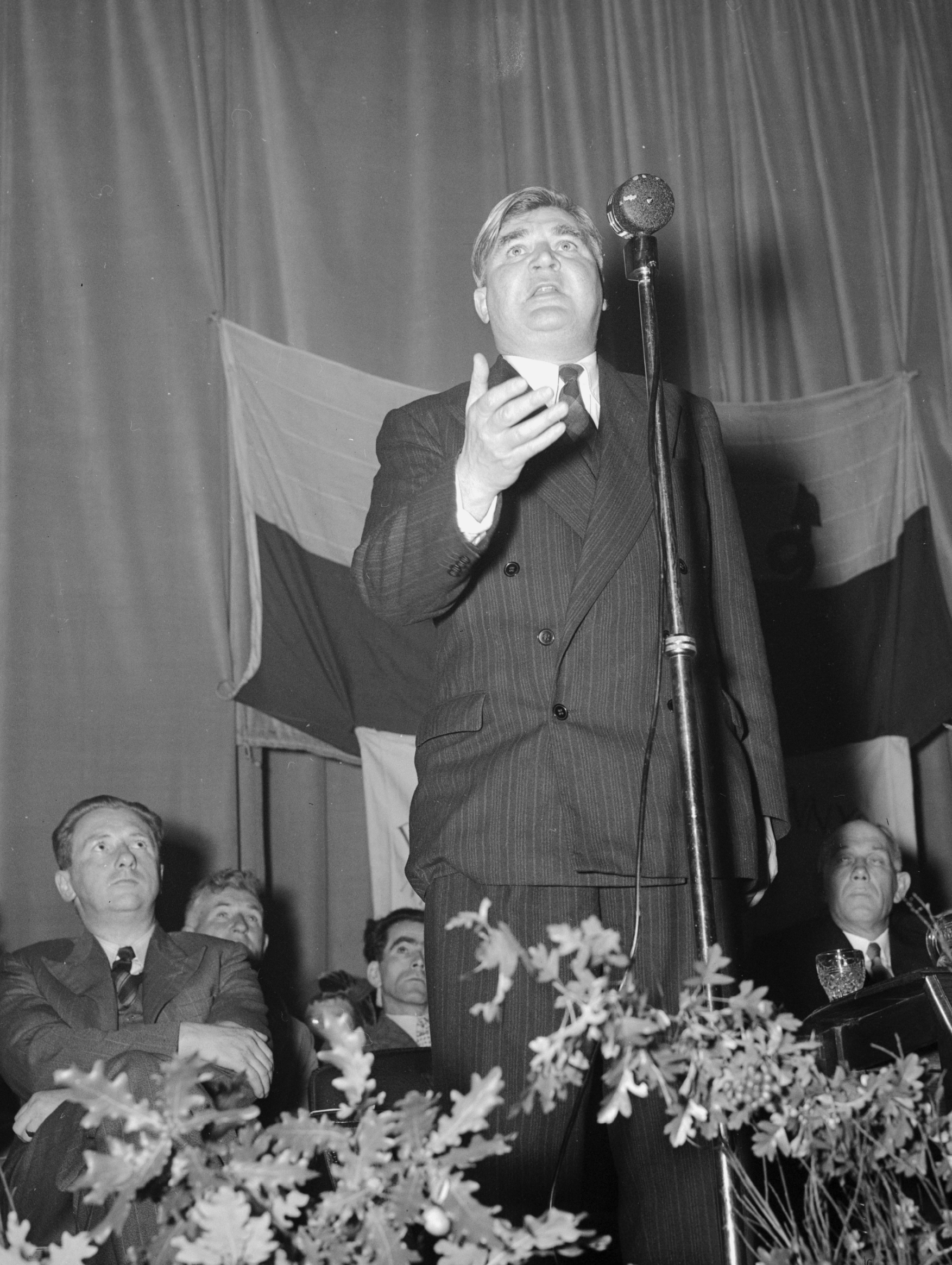
Aneurin Bevan speaking in Corwen in 1952

Bevan's last decade saw his political position weaken year by year as he failed to find a winning issue that would make use of his skills. In 1952 Bevan published In Place of Fear, "the most widely read socialist book" of the period, according to a highly critical right-wing Labour MP Anthony Crosland. According to The Times Literary Supplement, the book was a "dithyramb with meanderings into the many side-tracks of Mr Bevan's private and public experience". In the opening page of the book, Bevan begins: "A young miner in a South Wales colliery, my concern was with the one practical question: Where does power lie in this particular state of Great Britain, and how can it be attained by the workers?"

In March 1952, a poorly prepared Bevan came off the worse in an evening Commons debate on health with Conservative backbencher Iain Macleod, whose performance led Churchill to appoint him as Minister of Health some six weeks after the debate.

Out of office, Bevan soon exacerbated the split within the Labour Party between the right and the left which weakened the party in the 1950s. For the next five years, he was the leader of the left wing of the Labour Party, who became known as Bevanites. They criticised the right-wing "Gaitskellites" high defence expenditure (especially for nuclear weapons), called for better relations with the Soviet Union, and opposed the party leader, Clement Attlee, on most issues. According to Richard Crossman, Bevan hated "the in-fighting which you have to do in politics.... He wasn't cut out to be a leader, he was cut out to be a prophet". In April 1954, Bevan resigned from the Shadow Cabinet, having been rebuked by Attlee after accusing the Labour leader of surrendering to American pressure over a proposed multi-national defence organisation in Asia and the Pacific. He later said that he had resigned his position to "call attention to the fact that their movement was in grave crisis", and stated his belief that he would have been party chairman by the following year if he had remained. In July of the same year, Bevan announced his intention to stand for election as the Treasurer of the Labour Party against Hugh Gaitskell. His nomination received a severe blow on the same day it was announced, when two unions that traditionally sided with the left, the National Union of Mineworkers and the Amalgamated Engineering Union, pledged their support for his opponent. Although unsuccessful in his bid, he did celebrate 25 years as the MP for Ebbw Vale.

In March 1955, when Britain was preparing for Operation Grapple, the testing of its first hydrogen bomb, Bevan led a revolt of 57 Labour MPs and abstained on a key vote. The Parliamentary Labour Party voted 141 to 113 to withdraw the whip from him, but it was restored within a month, due to his popularity. After the 1955 general election, Attlee retired as Labour leader. Bevan contested the leadership against both Morrison and Labour right-winger Gaitskell, but it was Gaitskell who emerged victorious with more than half of the ballots. Bevan's remark that "I know the right kind of political Leader for the Labour Party is a kind of desiccated calculating machine" was assumed to refer to Gaitskell, although Bevan denied it (commenting upon Gaitskell's record as Chancellor of the Exchequer as having "proved" this). Bevan also failed in a bid to become deputy leader, losing out to Jim Griffiths. He instead stood again for the role of party treasurer and was duly elected, beating George Brown.

Despite Bevan's criticism of the new party leader, Gaitskell decided to appoint him as Shadow Colonial Secretary, and then Shadow Foreign Secretary in 1956. Bevan was as critical of Nasserist Egypt's seizure of the Suez Canal on 26 July 1956 as he was of the subsequent Anglo-French military response. He compared Gamal Abdel Nasser with Ali Baba and the Forty Thieves, from One Thousand and One Nights. He was a vocal critic of the Conservative government's actions in the Suez Crisis, noticeably delivering high-profile speeches at a protest rally in Trafalgar Square on 4 November 1956, and criticising the government's actions and arguments in the Commons on 5 December 1956. Bevan accused the government of a "policy of bankruptcy and despair", stating at the Trafalgar rally:

We are stronger than Egypt but there are other countries stronger than us. Are we prepared to accept for ourselves the logic we are applying to Egypt? If nations more powerful than ourselves accept the absence of principle, the anarchistic attitude of Eden and launch bombs on London, what answer have we got, what complaint have we got? If we are going to appeal to force, if force is to be the arbiter to which we appeal, it would at least make common sense to try to make sure beforehand that we have got it, even if you accept that abysmal logic, that decadent point of view.

We are in fact in the position today of having appealed to force in the case of a small nation, where if it is appealed to against us it will result in the destruction of Great Britain, not only as a nation, but as an island containing living men and women. Therefore I say to Anthony [Eden], I say to the British government, there is no count at all upon which they can be defended.

They have besmirched the name of Britain. They have made us ashamed of the things of which formerly we were proud. They have offended against every principle of decency and there is only one way in which they can even begin to restore their tarnished reputation and that is to get out! Get out! Get out!

Bevan dismayed many of his supporters when he suddenly reversed his opposition to nuclear weapons. Speaking at the 1957 Labour Party conference, he decried unilateral nuclear disarmament, saying "It would send a British Foreign Secretary naked into the conference-chamber". This statement is often misconstrued: Bevan argued that unilateralism would result in Britain's loss of allies, and one interpretation of his metaphor is that nakedness would come from the lack of allies, not the lack of weapons. According to the journalist Paul Routledge, Donald Bruce, a former MP and Parliamentary Private Secretary and adviser to Bevan, had told him that Bevan's shift on the disarmament issue was the result of discussions with the Soviet government, where they advised him to push for British retention of nuclear weapons so they could possibly be used as a bargaining chip in negotiations with the United States.

In 1957, Bevan, Richard Crossman and the Labour Party's General Secretary Morgan Phillips sued The Spectator magazine for libel, after one of its writers described them as drinking heavily during an Italian Socialist Party conference. The article wrote that the three men:

...puzzled the Italians by their capacity to fill themselves like tanks with whisky and coffee... Although the Italians were never sure the British delegation were sober, they always attributed to them an immense political acumen.

The three won their case, and obtained financial damages of £2,500 each. Crossman later acknowledged that they had perjured themselves to do so.

Bevan was elected unopposed as Deputy Leader of the Labour Party in 1959, succeeding Griffiths. His last speech in the House of Commons, in the debate of 3 November 1959 on the Queen's Speech, referred to the difficulties of persuading the electorate to support a policy which would make them less well-off in the short term, but more prosperous in the long term.

== Death ==
Bevan had said "I would rather be kept alive in the efficient if cold altruism of a large hospital than expire in a gush of warm sympathy in a small one". He checked into the Royal Free Hospital in London on 27 December 1959 to undergo surgery for an ulcer, but malignant stomach cancer was discovered instead in a major operation two days later.

After a lengthy period in hospital, on 14 February 1960 Bevan returned home and announced he would not be returning to politics in the near future, so as to be able to recuperate and plan an extended holiday. In May 1960 Jawaharlal Nehru, Prime Minister of India, while in England visited Bevan at his home in Asheridge Farm (where Bevan was a keen amateur farmer, keeping cattle and pigs).

Bevan died in his sleep at 4.10pm on 6 July 1960, at the age of 62, at his home, Asheridge Farm, Chesham, Buckinghamshire. His remains were cremated at Gwent Crematorium in Croesyceiliog in a private family ceremony. An open-air service was held in his constituency of Ebbw Vale and was presided over by Donald Soper. Jennie Lee explained in a letter to Michael Foot, who would be elected to Bevan's seat in the by-election that ensued following his death, that Bevan had specifically chosen to have a non-religious funeral and not a Christian service, because he was a firm humanist.

'Nye is asleep next door. Later today he will be taken home to Wales. Tomorrow he will be cremated in keeping with his known views. [Nye] was never a hypocrite. No falsity must touch him once he is no longer available to defend his views. He was not a cold-blooded rationalist. He was no calculating machine. He was a great humanist whose religion lay in loving his fellow men and trying to serve them... He knelt reverently in respect to a friend or friend's faith, but he never pretended to be anything other than what he was, a humanist.

— Jennie Lee to Michael Foot, 7 July 1960.

In his 2014 biography, Nick Thomas-Symonds described "an outpouring of national mourning" that followed Bevan's death. The Daily Herald stated that some MPs were seen to be crying in Parliament and described how there was "sorrow at every street corner" in the South Wales Valleys. Harold Macmillan ended his Prime Minister's Questions session in Parliament two days after Bevan's death by paying tribute to the opposition MP, describing him as "a great personality and a great national figure". Macmillan said that despite being a "controversial figure" during his career, Bevan's death had seen an outpouring of genuine "admiration and affection". Labour leader Hugh Gaitskell also paid tribute to his former shadow cabinet member and ended his speech by labelling Bevan as "one of the great men of our day".

== Legacy ==
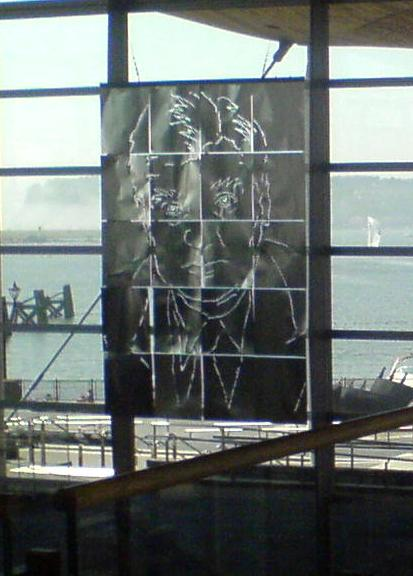
A portrait of Bevan in the Senedd building

Bevan's most significant legacy is the National Health Service. Bevan foresaw that it would always be the subject of public debate, warning that "This service must always be changing, growing and improving; it must always appear to be inadequate." However, seven decades after it was founded, a 2013 opinion poll conducted on behalf of British Future found that the NHS was more popular than at its creation, and more popular than the monarchy, the BBC, and the British Armed Forces.

Bevan was particularly noted for his public speaking, being described by Robin Butler, Baron Butler of Brockwell, as "the greatest parliamentary speaker since Charles James Fox". Winston Churchill, the target of numerous diatribes from Bevan during his career, commented that Bevan was "one of the few members that I will sit still and listen to". Bevan's reputation as a hard-line socialist typically preceded him: Sir William Douglas, who served as Bevan's deputy in the Ministry of Health, had initially stated that he would "never work with a man like that". However, by the end of his tenure, he had declared Bevan as "the best minister we have had". Clement Attlee expressed his support that Bevan should have been the leader of the Labour Party during his lifetime but was held back by his demeanour, stating "he wants to be two things simultaneously, rebel and official leader, and you can't be both".

A bronze statue was commissioned by South Glamorgan County Council and erected in 1987 in the city centre of Cardiff. The Nye Bevan Estate in Clapton Park, Hackney, London, was named after Bevan, and was opened in October 1962 by his friend and biographer Michael Foot.

In November 1997 BBC One broadcast the drama profile Food for Ravens, with Brian Cox as Bevan and Sinéad Cusack as Jennie Lee.

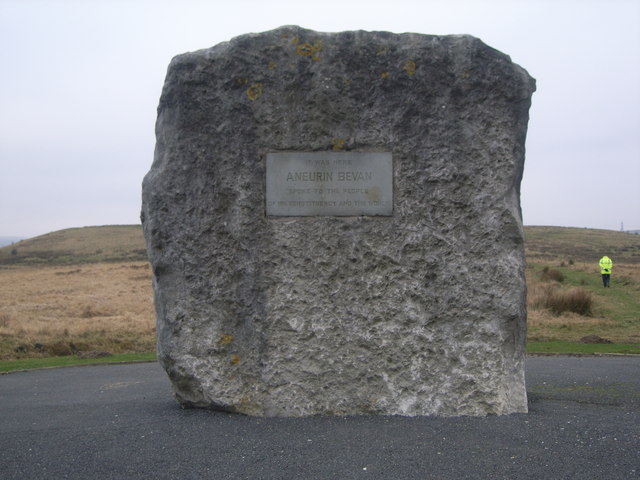
The main stone of the Aneurin Bevan Memorial Stones at the Sirhowy Valley Walk

The Aneurin Bevan Memorial Stones were erected at the beginning of the Sirhowy Valley Walk with three smaller stones (representing three towns of his constituency Ebbw Vale, Rhymney and Tredegar) surrounding a larger stone representing Bevan. In 2002, Bevan was voted as the 45th greatest Briton of all time by the BBC public opinion poll, 100 Greatest Britons. The following year, Bevan was voted number one in the 100 Welsh Heroes poll, a response to find the public's favourite Welsh people of all time. Numerous institutions bear Bevan's name, including the Aneurin Bevan University Health Board, and Ysbyty Aneurin Bevan, a hospital located within his old Ebbw Vale constituency. In July 2023 to celebrate the 75th anniversary of the National Health Service, Great Western Railway named a train after Bevan in a ceremony at Newport station. The train was unveiled by Aneria Thomas, the first baby born under the NHS.

In 2015, Welsh actor Michael Sheen gave a speech in which he described Bevan as a mythical creature, stating, "He had cast-iron integrity and a raging passion". In 2017, Sheen gave his Aneurin Bevan Lecture at the Hay Festival about the culture and society and the humane vision and tradition that Bevan inspires. Sheen portrayed Bevan in Tim Price's play Nye at the National Theatre in London from March until May 2024 and at Wales Millennium Centre in Cardiff from May until June 2024. The play was revived with Sheen reprising the role at the National Theatre and Wales Millennium Centre in July and August 2025.

In 2024, a new health centre opened in Tredegar, Bevan's hometown. Named "The Bevan Health and Wellbeing Centre", it provides primary care and some secondary care to those in the catchment area of the Aneurin Bevan University Health Board.

In the 2026 Senedd election, the legacy of Bevan was reported on when Welsh Labour was defeated in Blaenau Gwent Caerffili Rhymni. His cousin's daughter Donna Cushing was elected in the election for Sir Fynwy Torfaen for Plaid Cymru.

== Bibliography ==
- Why Not Trust The Tories?, 1944. Published under the pseudonym 'Celticus'. The title was intended ironically.
- In Place of Fear, 1952. (ISBN 9781163810118)

Excerpts from Bevan's speeches are included in Greg Rosen's book Old Labour to New : the dreams that inspired, the battles that divided (published by Methuen in 2005 (ISBN 978-1-84275-045-2)).

Bevan's key speeches in the legislative arena are to be found in:

- Peter J. Laugharne (ed.), Aneurin Bevan – A Parliamentary Odyssey: Volume I, Speeches at Westminster 1929–1944, Manutius Press, 1996.
- Peter J. Laugharne (ed.), Aneurin Bevan – A Parliamentary Odyssey: Volume II, Speeches at Westminster 1945–1960, Manutius Press, 2000.
- Peter J. Laugharne (ed.), Aneurin Bevan – A Parliamentary Odyssey: Volumes I and II, Speeches at Westminster 1929–1960, Manutius Press, 2004.

== See also ==
- Bevanism
- Post-war Britain (1945–1979)
- Attlee ministry
- List of Welsh medical pioneers

== Notes ==
Parliament of the United Kingdom
Preceded by Evan Davies	Member of Parliament for Ebbw Vale; 1929–1960	Succeeded by Michael Foot
Political offices
Preceded by Henry Willink	Minister of Health; 1945–1951	Succeeded by Hilary Marquand
Preceded by George Isaacs	Minister of Labour and National Service; 1951	Succeeded by Alf Robens
Preceded by Alf Robens	Shadow Foreign Secretary; 1956–1959	Succeeded by Denis Healey
Party political offices
Preceded by Hugh Gaitskell	Treasurer of the Labour Party; 1956–1960	Succeeded by Harry Nicholas
Preceded by Jim Griffiths	Deputy Leader of the Labour Party; 1959–1960	Succeeded by George Brown
Media offices
Preceded by Raymond Postgate	Editor of Tribune; 1941–1945; Served alongside: Jon Kimche	Succeeded by Evelyn Anderson; Frederic Mullally
