= David Firth =

David Firth may refer to:

- David Firth (actor), English actor and writer
- David Firth (animator), creator of the British animated web series Salad Fingers
- David Firth (statistician), British statistician

== See also ==
- David Frith, cricket writer and historian
