= Ebbw Vale Steelworks =

Former iron and steel works in Wales

Coordinates: 51°46′12″N 3°12′3″W

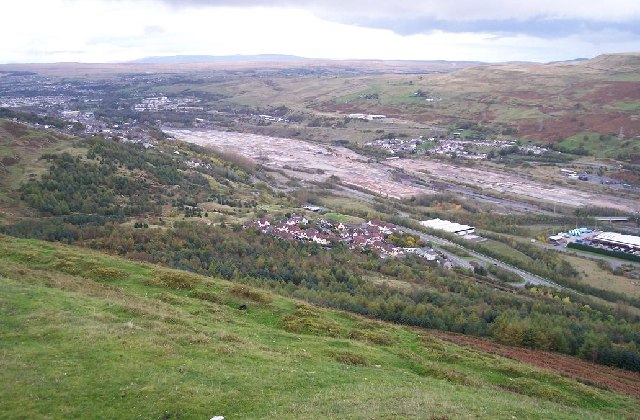
Cleared site of the former Ebbw Vale Steelworks

Ebbw Vale Steelworks was an integrated steel mill located in Ebbw Vale, South Wales. Developed from 1790, by the late 1930s it had become the largest steel mill in Britain. It was nationalised after World War II. As the steel industry changed to bulk handling, iron and steel making was ceased in the 1970s, and the site was redeveloped as a specialised tinplate works. It was closed by Corus in 2002, but is being redeveloped in a joint partnership between Blaenau Gwent Council and the Welsh Government.

== Development ==
By the mid to late 1700s, the steep-sided wooded valley of the Ebbw Fawr river was home to a population of around 120, who worked the valley as farmers.

In 1789, Walter Watkins was the owner of a forge in Glangrwney, near Crickhowell, which lacked an adequate supply of pig iron from the Clydach Ironworks. In agreement with two business partners, his son-in-law Charles Cracroft and iron master Jeremiah Homfray of the Penydarren Ironworks at Merthyr Tydfil, Watkins leased land at Pen y Cae farm in the parish of Aberystruth from John Miles. Situated on the northern tip of the South Wales coalfield and located next to the River Ebbw, they had easy access to the basic iron making materials: coal and iron ore obtained by 'patch' working and local drifts and levels, plus water and power from the river. Limestone was to be transported by mule train from Llanelly Quarries, about four miles away.

The partnership erected a blast furnace and casting shop against the hillside, which created a weekly output of 25 tons of pig iron per week. Called "Pen y cae" after the farming hamlet by the locals, the partners adopted the river's name to form the Ebbw Vale Furnace Company Ltd (EVC), hence naming both the works and the developing township.

In 1793 Homfray bought out his partners with help from the Bristol-based Quaker family the Harfords, who in 1796 bought out Homfray himself to take complete ownership.

== Early 19th century ==
The plant was developed as a specialist forge. Needing additional supplies of iron, the company, now owned by the Harfords family trust, bought and integrated the Sirhowy Ironworks and colliery. The company then built four new cupola furnaces and added steam engine power.

This allowed the company to produce the world's first rolled-steel rail tracks in 1857, later followed by the pioneering Liverpool & Manchester and the Stockton & Darlington Railway.

=== Transport ===
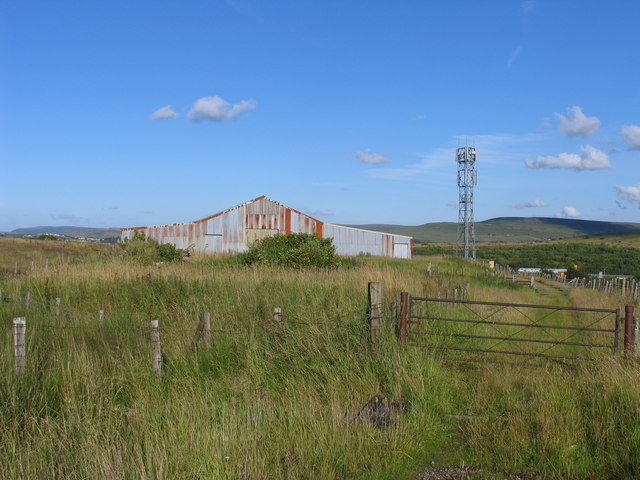
A mobile phone mast situated on the trackbed of the former Rassa Railroad, which was extended to enable limestone to be moved from Cwar y Hendre to the iron and steel works at Ebbw Vale. Timber sleepers and some of the original stone sleepers can still be seen today along this bridleway

The new railway line contracts required additional integration across the production facilities. By the end of the 18th century, both the company and the Tredegar Iron Company needed to transport raw materials to and products from various ironworks in the upper Ebbw Valley, to Newport Docks.

Developments included:

- Rassa Railroad: tramway built to connect the Sirhowy Ironworks to the Beaufort Ironworks in Ebbw Vale, and connecting them both to several limestone quarries at Trevil.
- Llanhiledd Tramroad: from Crumlin (low level) north to Ebbw Vale.
- Sirhowy Tramroad: Newport to Crumlin (low level).

By 1805, a 24-mile (39 km) stretch of tramline had been laid to transport coal and iron ore to Newport Docks, laid jointly by Tredegar Iron Company and the Monmouthshire Canal Company. Pulled by teams of horses, in 1829 Chief Engineer Thomas Ellis was authorised to purchase a steam locomotive from the Stephenson Company. Built at Tredegar Works, it made its maiden trip on 17 December 1829.

On grouping in 1923, all of these railway lines became part of the Great Western Railway's Ebbw Vale Line, now operated as a passenger-only service by Transport for Wales.

=== New owners and expansion ===
After some commercial failures in the United States, in 1844 the Hardford's family trust sold the works to partners Abraham Darby, Henry Dickenson, Joseph Robinson and J Tothill of Coalbrookdale, with partner Thomas Brown designated managing director. This change started a period of expansion via acquisition, including:

- Three blast furnaces of the Victoria Ironworks from Lord Llanover, originally built for the Monmouthshire Iron & Coal Company
- Abersychan Ironworks, consisting of six blast furnaces
- Production facilities in Pontypool consisting of four furnaces, a forge, tinplate works and coal collieries
- Iron ore fields in the Brendon Hills, Somerset, Bilbao, Spain and the Forest of Dean, Gloucestershire

In 1850, the company's chemist George Parry achieved a great economy in blast furnace practice, becoming the first to adopt the cup and cone successfully on blast furnaces. He then conducted experiments in converting iron into steel, but the company was eventually forced to adopt the patented process of Henry Bessemer. By 1863, the company was producing 100,000 tons of rail and merchant bars per annum, from 19 blast furnaces, 192 puddling furnaces, and 99 heating furnaces located at Ebbw Vale, Sirhowy, Victoria, Abersychan, Pontypool and Abercarn. It also had six wharfs at Newport Docks, the hematite mine in the Forest of Dean, and spathic iron ore mines in the Brendon Hills and Spain.

== Ebbw Vale Steel, Iron and Coal Company ==
In June 1868, Darby converted the partnership into a limited company, the Ebbw Vale Steel, Iron and Coal Company (EVSICC), headquartered in Manchester. The capital injection allowed investment in the most powerful blowing engine in the world to serve four of the Ebbw Vale furnaces, new rolling mills and a Bessemer converter shop which produced the first steel ingots, including high carbon spiegel-eisen (mirror iron).

=== 1930s redevelopment ===
By 1929, a lack of investment had led to a low number of new orders. The oncoming economic depression led to the works being shut down; this resulted in huge redundancies, with minimal maintenance applied to the residual infrastructure. By 1934, unemployment in Ebbw Vale stood at 54% out of a population of 31,000.

In 1935, the UK Government forced the shareholders of EVSICC to sell the site to tin plate manufacturer Richard Beaumont Thomas. He chose to import the UK's first continuous hot rolling mill from the United States, and totally redeveloped the site into a modern steelworks using this technology. Due to the quality of steel produced by the mill, Thomas effectively started the redevelopment of the entire UK steel industry, with the mill producing hot rolled coils instead of bars, billets and plates.

Two and a half years later, production at the site restarted. This drew former steelworkers back to the valley, and by 1948 the plant was the largest in Europe, producing 600,000 tons of rolled steel annually. A lack of manpower drew in migrant workers from all over devastated post-war Europe and the British Empire.

=== World War II ===
Most occupations inside the steel works were considered reserved trades, so employees were able to opt out of the compulsory call-up for World War II military service. However, a number of men did decide to enlist, which resulted in some trades being worked throughout the war by women for the first time. The plant drew specific attention from German Luftwaffe bombers on more than one occasion, but the deep valley proved difficult to bomb and the plant survived.

== Richard Thomas & Baldwins ==
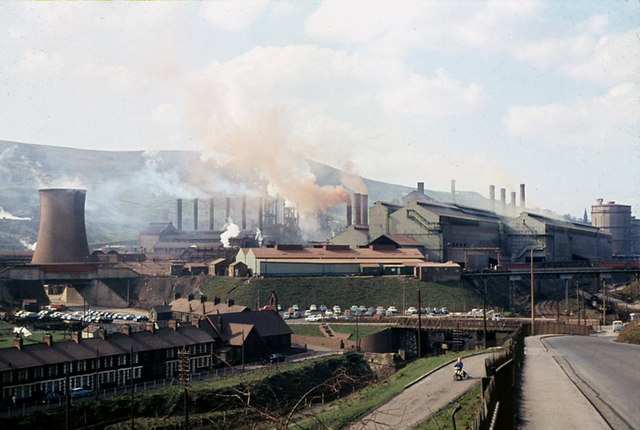
Ebbw Vale steelworks in 1969, by this time under the control of British Steel Corporation

In 1948, two of the country's largest steel companies – Richard Thomas, which had plants in Ebbw Vale, Gloucester and the Forest of Dean, and Baldwins, with plants in Stourport and South Wales – agreed to a merger. The new company, Richard Thomas and Baldwins (RTB), became the UK's largest steel maker by volume.

In 1948, RTB introduced the first continuous tinning line at its Ebbw Vale tinplate works.

In 1951, RTB was nationalised and placed under the Iron and Steel Corporation of Great Britain. Under Conservative rule in 1953, it passed to the Iron and Steel Holding and Realisation Agency in readiness for privatisation. However, its size – it was the UK's largest steel company – inhibited its sale. It was still in public ownership when the industry was re-nationalised under British Steel Corporation in 1967.

== British Steel ==
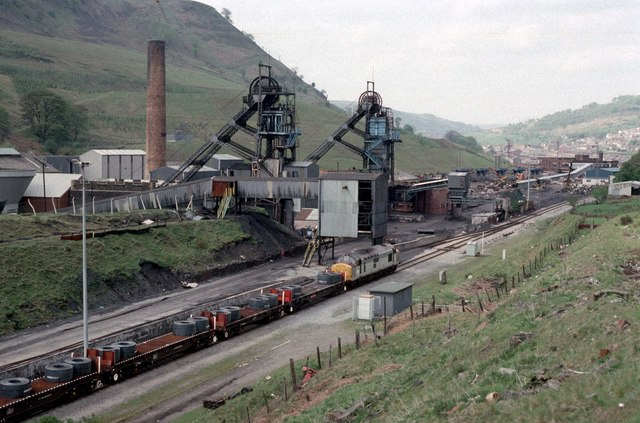
10 May 1989: a British Railways Class 37 diesel locomotive hauls a train of rolled steel coils up the Ebbw Valley towards the tinplate works, passing the recently closed Marine Colliery in Cwm, Blaenau Gwent. Marine was a former EVSICC colliery, and this picture epitomises the integrated nature of coal and iron ore with steel making

The steelworks was nationalised as part of British Steel in 1967, becoming part of the South Wales group alongside Llanwern and Port Talbot Steelworks. By this time, 14,500 people were employed in the works in and around Ebbw Vale.

The original choice for the site was due to its co-location with both iron ore and coal. However, by the 1970s the industry had changed to one of sheer volume, with supplies drawn from vast mines and pits. If plants were remote from these, they required access to bulk material handling transport facilities, such as deep water ports. Ebbw Vale was neither located near such vast pits, nor bulk shipping facilities. When British Steel announced its 10-year integrated production plan for South Wales, it therefore proposed to stop iron and steel-making operations at Ebbw Vale, and to redevelop the site as a specialist tinplate manufacturer.

The closure of the coke ovens in March 1972 allowed work to commence on removing the 19th century "drill ground" tip, which contained 500,000 tons of waste material. Once the waste removal was complete, the site was back-filled, allowing the cold rolling mill to be extended. This was now able to supply sufficient capacity of rolled steel to a new tinplate complex, the development of which started in 1974 with the commissioning of a newly built hydrochloric acid pickle line.

With staff redeployed to the developing tinplate plant, on 17 July 1975 both the converter shop and all remaining blast furnaces closed, having produced 16,916,523 tons of iron. The continuous hot strip mill ceased operation on 29 September 1977, having rolled 23 million tons of steel since it was commissioned in 1937. Having slabbed 24 million tons of steel, the final cast was made in the open hearth department in May 1978.

Demolition and clearance of these plants allowed the second phase of the tinplate works to begin. This included new constructions of an effluent plant, single stack annealing line, two electrolytic tinning lines (ETL), a cleaning line, and a Hallden Shears plant. Having cost £57 million, the plant was officially opened in June 1978 by Derek Hornby, the President of the Food Manufacturing Federation. It was envisaged in the original plan that a third phase would be constructed to double production again, but the government did not authorise these plans.

=== Ebbw Vale Garden Festival ===
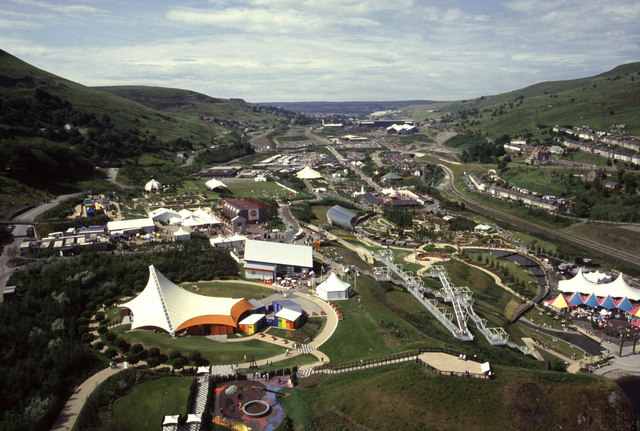
The 1992 National Garden Festival, the Ebbw Vale Garden Festival

By 1981, demolition and clearance of the former iron and steel plants was completed, and the southern boundary of the residual tinplate works was moved inwards. It was on this part of the site that Blaenau Gwent Borough Council approved a bid for the 1992 National Garden Festival, awarded to the council and site in November 1988. It was billed as Garden Festival Wales and attracted over 2 million visitors to South Wales.

== Closure ==
On 6 October 1999, a merger was announced between the Dutch steel company Koninklijke Hoogovens and British Steel to form a new company, Corus.

Although investment had continued at the Ebbw Vale site over the past two decades, No.2 ETL(Electrolytic Tinning Line) was shut down in 1995, and rather than be redeveloped as planned had become a source of spares for the No.1 ETL. Steel production capacity was in excess of the required market in Europe, hence the need for the merger, which would result in the closure of capacity across the newly integrated company. With much tinplate consumption moving to the newly expanding Asian market, on 1 February 2001 Corus announced the complete closure of the Ebbw Vale site, and the resultant loss of 780 jobs.

The plant began a shut-down procedure, with many of the lines within the plant packaged up and transported to other sites in the Corus company (Trostre near Llanelli, and IJmuiden in the Netherlands), while other plants were sold as a package to an Indian-based company.

In July 2002, the Ebbw Vale steel works site closed; a skeleton staff deconstructed the remaining sold plants and handled shipping of residual finished product until December 2002.

== Redevelopment ==
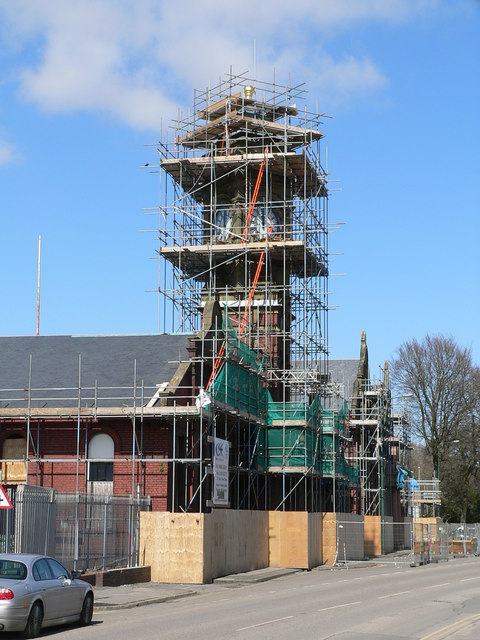
Restoration of the clock tower of the Grade II listed former Steelworks General Offices, April 2008

In 2002, Scottish site clearance and demolition contractors Morton assessed the site's land needs for future development. Demolition commenced in August, and the land was remediated over a period of approximately five years.

In 2005, Corus sold the site to Blaenau Gwent Council.

In 2007, a £350 million regeneration project was jointly announced by the council and the Welsh Government. Outline planning permission was granted for a mixed use redevelopment, including housing, retail, offices, wetlands and a learning campus.

The council proposed the development of a £15 million urban village scheme close to the town, which would house a new railway station and elevated access to the main town. The first part of the scheme, Ysbyty Aneurin Bevan, opened in 2010; it was Wales' first all-individual-bed hospital, named after National Health Service founder Aneurin Bevan.

=== Steelworks General Offices ===
In October 2011, the Grade II listed former Steelworks General Offices were reopened after a £12 million refit. Originally constructed in 1915–1916, they were redeveloped as a visitor centre and archive. The original building now houses the Ebbw Vale Steelworks Archive Trust, a voluntary organisation which holds an historical record of steel making in Ebbw Vale, and a "4D" immersive cinema. A newly built wing houses the Gwent Archives, which were moved from Cwmbran, providing 10 kilometres (6.2 mi) of shelving to house thousands of documents which date back to the 12th century. HM Queen Elizabeth II officially opened the General Offices as part of her Diamond Jubilee Tour on 3 May 2012, accompanied by the Duke of Edinburgh.
