= Funny Cuts =

Funny Cuts is a television programme strand on E4 which started on 7 July 2006. It features up and coming comedy talent. The first episode featured Internet sensation Devvo, played by Christian Webb, performing material written by himself and David Firth.
