= Ebbw Vale =

Town in Blaenau Gwent, Wales

Coordinates: 51.78°N 3.21°W

Ebbw Vale: Welsh: Glynebwy
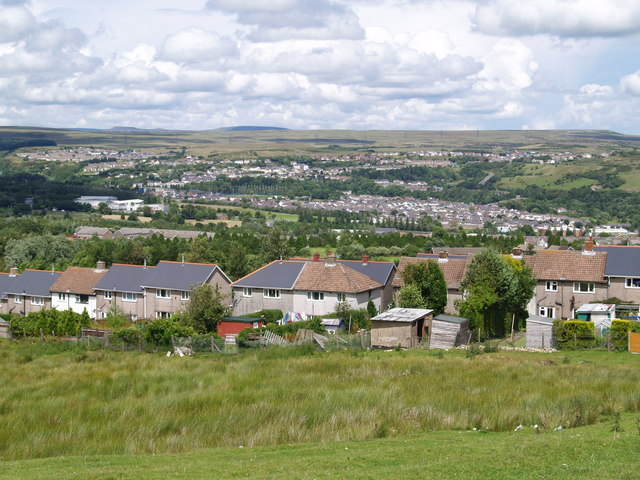
- Looking north over Ebbw Vale from Hilltop

- Location within Blaenau Gwent
- Population: 18,558
- OS grid reference: SO165095
- Principal area: Blaenau Gwent
- Country: Wales
- Sovereign state: United Kingdom
- Post town: EBBW VALE
- Postcode district: NP23
- Dialling code: 01495
- Police: Gwent
- Fire: South Wales
- Ambulance: Welsh
- UK Parliament: Blaenau Gwent and Rhymney
- Senedd Cymru – Welsh Parliament: Blaenau Gwent Caerffili Rhymni

Ebbw Vale (/ˈɛbuː veɪl/; Welsh: Glynebwy) is a town at the head of the valley formed by the Ebbw Fawr tributary of the Ebbw River in Wales. It is the largest town and the administrative centre of Blaenau Gwent county borough. The Ebbw Vale and Brynmawr conurbation has a population of roughly 33,000. It has direct access to the dualled A465 Heads of the Valleys trunk road and borders the Brecon Beacons National Park.

== Early history ==
There is evidence of very early human activity in the area. Y Domen Fawr is a Bronze Age burial cairn above the town and at Cefn Manmoel there is a demarcation dyke believed to be of Neolithic or medieval origins. In relatively modern times the area was a quiet uplands spot in rural Monmouthshire. With only about 120 inhabitants at the end of the 18th century, Ebbw Vale and the whole area was transformed by the Industrial Revolution.

== Iron and steel making ==
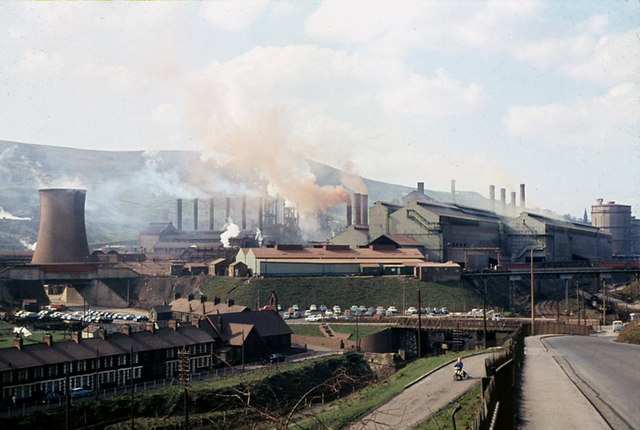
Ebbw Vale Steelworks in 1969, by this time under the control of British Steel Corporation

Ebbw Vale Iron Works, which later became the Ebbw Vale Steelworks, opened in 1778, followed by the opening of a number of coal mines around 1790. Rails for the Stockton and Darlington Railway were manufactured at Ebbw Vale in 1829. Steel from Ebbw Vale was used to construct the Sydney Harbour Bridge.

At its height (1930s—40s), the steelworks in Ebbw Vale was the largest in Europe, although it attracted very little attention from German bombers during World War II. By the 1960s, around 14,500 people were employed at the steelworks. The end of the century witnessed a massive collapse of the UK steel industry. A strike in 1980 was followed by closures and redundancies which resulted in the dismantling of many of the old plants. In 2002 only 450 were employed in the old industries, and by July of that year the final works closed. Today there are no steelworks or mines left in the area. Ebbw Vale is still recognised for its innovation and contribution to the development of Britain as an industrial nation.

== Recent times ==
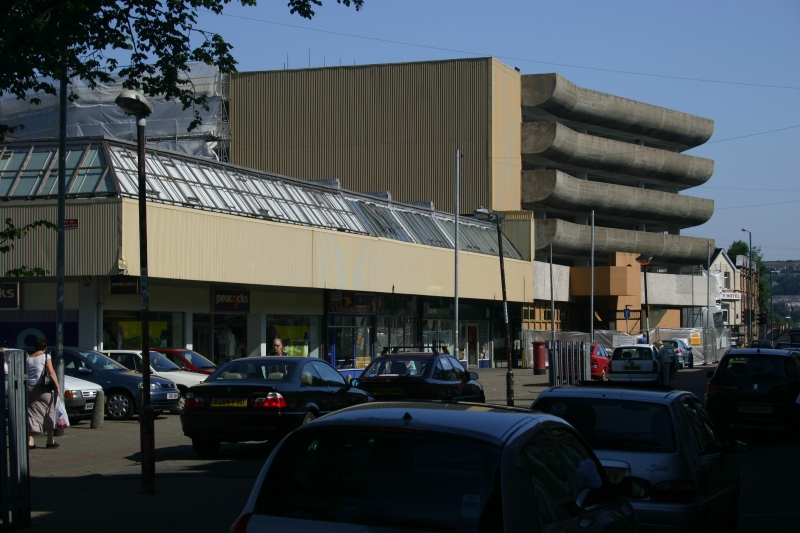
Ebbw Vale town centre

Largely as a result of the decline of the mining and steel industries, Ebbw Vale had one of the highest unemployment rates in the United Kingdom, but has been recovering. There are several industrial estates with some significant manufacturing facilities. In 2003, work began on demolishing and redeveloping the steelworks site. By 2015, the site was completely changed, with a new hospital, college campus, school and leisure centre.

Ebbw Vale first hosted the National Eisteddfod in 1958. The Welsh language was dominant in the area until the last quarter of the 19th century and remnants of the language (Welsh hymns and pockets of Welsh being spoken in nearby Rhymney) persisted into the 1970s. The National Eisteddfod returned to Ebbw Vale in 2010.

Aneurin Bevan, the Labour Party politician who was main architect of the National Health Service (NHS), was the Member of Parliament (MP) for Ebbw Vale from the 1929 general election until his death in 1960, when he was succeeded as MP by Michael Foot. The seat joined with the neighbouring Abertillery constituency to form Blaenau Gwent.

In 2010, the former community of Ebbw Vale was abolished and replaced by Ebbw Vale North and Ebbw Vale South. The Ebbw Vale conurbation today runs in an almost unbroken housing street plan three miles (5 km) or so from Beaufort in the North to Cwm in the South. There are significant areas of modern housing to the north and south of the town.

In 2024, the boundaries of the UK parliament constituency were changed to form Blaenau Gwent and Rhymney.

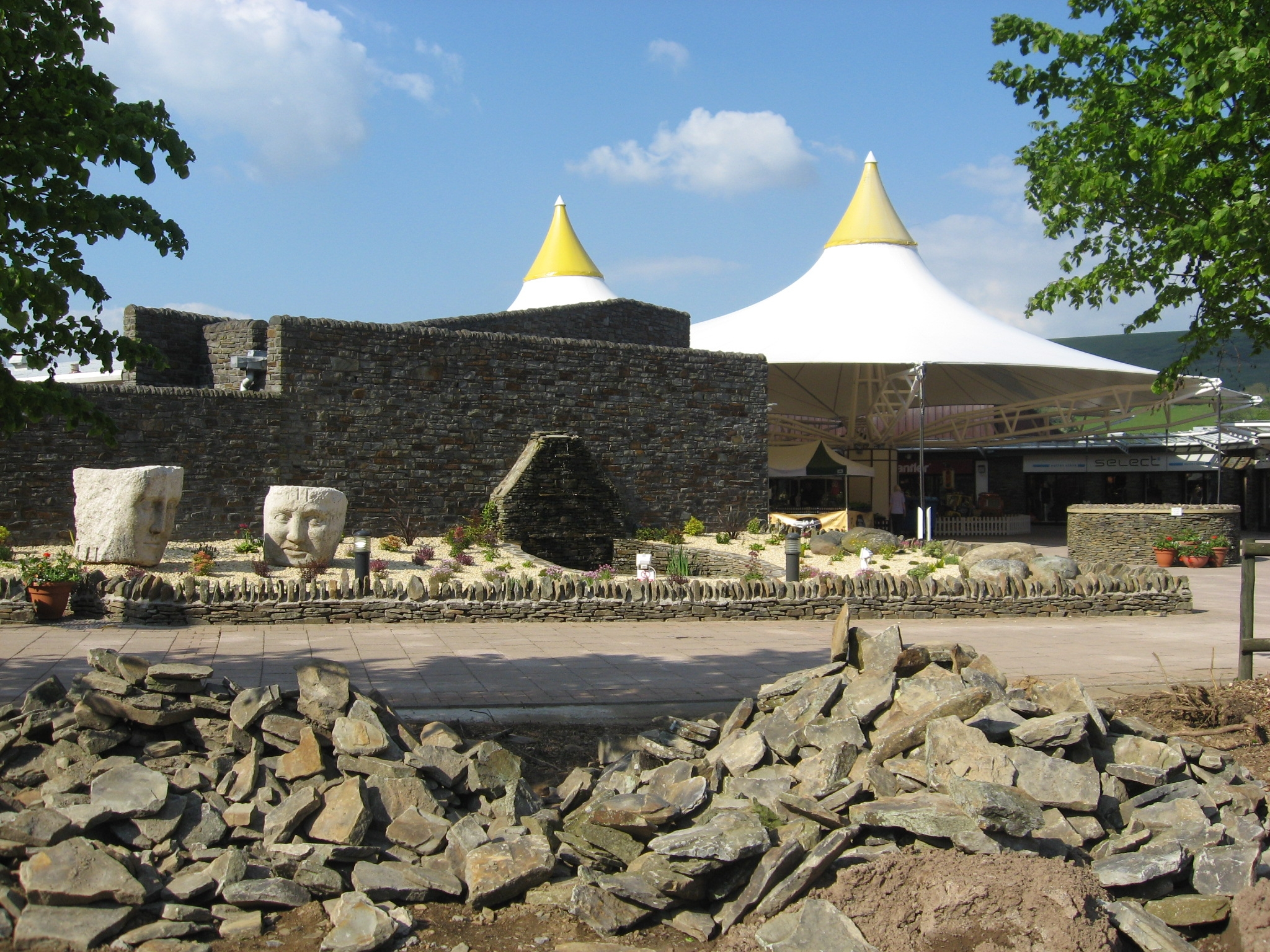
Entrance to Festival Park shopping outlet

=== National Garden Festival of Wales ===
In 1992, the Ebbw Vale Garden Festival was the last National Garden Festival. It was sited on the south side of the recently demolished steel works. The festival ran for five months between May and October 1992 attracting over two million visitors. The development cost around £18 million. Since then the site has been considerably redeveloped, with new housing, some light industry, and the Festival Park Branded Outlet, a retail outlet comprising approximately forty shops. However, by 2021, the shopping park had fallen into disuse and, in August 2021, it was sold to a real estate and investment company which planned to redevelop the site into a "mixed use business centre". The last store closed in early 2022.

=== Steelworks development ===
The Ebbw Vale Steelworks site known as "The Works" has been re-developed with a £350 million regeneration project by Blaenau Gwent Council and Welsh Government using EU redevelopment funding. It provides scope for housing, retail and office space, wetlands, a learning campus and more. Wales' first all-individual-bed hospital, Ysbyty Aneurin Bevan, opened in 2010.

=== Welsh Future Homes ===
A small development of four prototype houses have been built on the site as a precursor a wider residential development. Following a competition run by the council, several plots were developed in time to be demonstrated at the 2010 Eisteddfod, which was held on the steelworks site.

In 2010, Blaenau Gwent council and the United Welsh Housing Association built two eco-friendly prototype buildings. The Larch House and the Lime House, designed by Bere Architects, were both highly energy-efficient houses, meeting both Passivhaus and Code for Sustainable Homes Level 6 and Level 5 respectively. The buildings were open for demonstration at the 2010 Eisteddfod.

Ty Unnos is a two-bed property designed by Cardiff University's Design Research Unit. It meets Code for Sustainable Homes Level 5 and utilises construction techniques that allow Welsh softwood to be used in the fabric of the building.

=== The Environmental Resource Centre ===
The Environmental Resource Centre (ERC) is an educational facility run by Gwent Wildlife Trust. Designed by Cardiff University's Design Research Unit and Located on the Hotmill Plateau it was the first building to be completed as part of the redevelopment of the former steelworks site in Ebbw Vale. The centre is located on an ecologically rich site next to the Pumphouse cooling ponds, which have become a haven for wildlife since the closure of the steelworks. It was officially opened by Iolo Williams and Jane Davidson AM on 21 May 2010.

=== General Offices ===
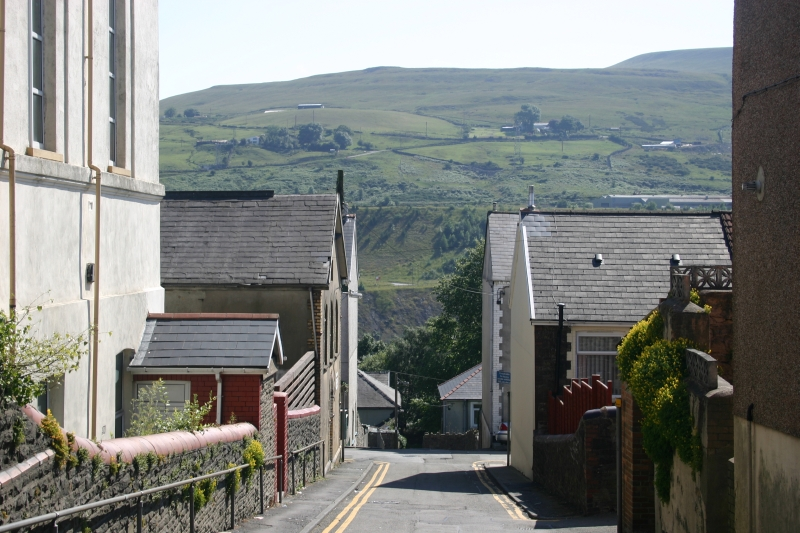
The view from Ebbw Vale.

The General Offices is a Grade II* listed building. Built between 1913 and 1915 it formed part of the steelworks site. A brand-new modern extension (contrasting with the original building) officially opened on 24 October 2010 and houses the Gwent Archives.

The main building is partially opened, with an entrance hall and function rooms, together with a 4D cinema.

The Queen officially opened the General Offices as part of her Diamond Jubilee Tour on 3 May 2012, accompanied by the Duke of Edinburgh.

As part of the Cultural Olympiad for the London 2012 Olympics, Adain Avion, a mobile art space created from the fuselage of a DC-9 aircraft, visited the General Offices between 1 and 7 July 2012.

== Education ==
Ebbw Vale currently is host to a selection of primary schools and infant schools, two secondary schools (Ebbw Fawr Learning Community and Brynmawr Foundation School) both covering a large catchment area. Penycwm Special School is also located in Ebbw Vale, in a joint building with the primary phase of Ebbw Vale Learning Community. Alongside this there is also the Ebbw Vale campus of Coleg Gwent, a Further Education college teaching a range of subjects from Mechanics, Media Studies, Humanities to Hairdressing and Beauty therapy. There is also an institute which provides a range of courses for mainly adult learners.

A new Coleg Gwent building was opened in 2012 alongside Wales' first 3–16 educational establishment titled the Ebbw Fawr Learning Community, a £52m investment. This has resulted in the closure of both Glyncoed Comprehensive School and Ebbw Vale Comprehensive School along with Pontygof Primary School, which now functions as a Pupil Referral Unit for behaviourally challenged students, and Briery Hill Primary School.

== Welsh language ==
According to the 2011 Census, 4.6% of Ebbw Vale North's 4,561 (210 residents) resident-population can speak, read, and write Welsh, and 5.7% of Ebbw Vale South's 4,274 (244 residents) resident-population can speak, read, and write Welsh. This is below the county's figure of 5.5% of 67,348 (3,705 residents) who can speak, read, and write Welsh.

== Sport and culture ==
Ebbw Vale sporting organisations have a long history. Rugby and cricket have flourished with the town’s Eugene Cross Park as their home.

Ebbw Vale Rugby Football Club can trace its roots back to the 1890s. Nicknamed the "Steelmen" after the area's former industrial base they have a successful record with many players achieving international honours. By 2015 they were playing at a semi-professional level in the Welsh Premiership just one level below regional rugby. Cricket predates rugby in the area with the first recorded match as far back as 1852. The town's association with the game grew such that until the early 2000s Glamorgan County Cricket fixtures were regularly held at Eugene Park.

Bowls, swimming and other football and rugby teams play locally at varying levels. The town's leisure centre has facilities including a 33-metre (108 ft)-long swimming pool. Beaufort Theatre, the largest in Blaenau Gwent, holds regular music, drama and other cultural events.

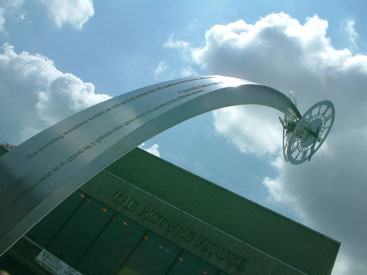
Town Centre Clock by Marianne Forrest, made by Smith of Derby

In 2009 the town centre underwent a great deal of improvements, including the addition of a major art work in the form of a 10.5-metre-high clock that cantilevers over the central boulevards. By 2015 an 830-acre (340 ha) motor sport complex and technology park, the Circuit of Wales was in the advance planning stage with commitments from major investors. To be located on moorland to the north of Ebbw Vale it was to host major motor bike racing events. With the potential for a claimed 6,000 new jobs (although other estimates put it at 3,300) the scheme had strong support from some local and national government, although as of 2019 the project has been cancelled indefinitely due to doubts over the financial viability of the project and plans.

South East Wales does not generally have a high incidence of Welsh speakers in the population. That was not always the case and until the late 1800s, the Ebbw Vale area was largely Welsh-speaking changing as industry brought workers in from outside the area.

A fictionalised version of the town was the setting for the 2024 BBC Three adult animated series The Golden Cobra, created by locals Adam Llewellyn, James Prygodzicz and Thomas Rees.

== Transport ==
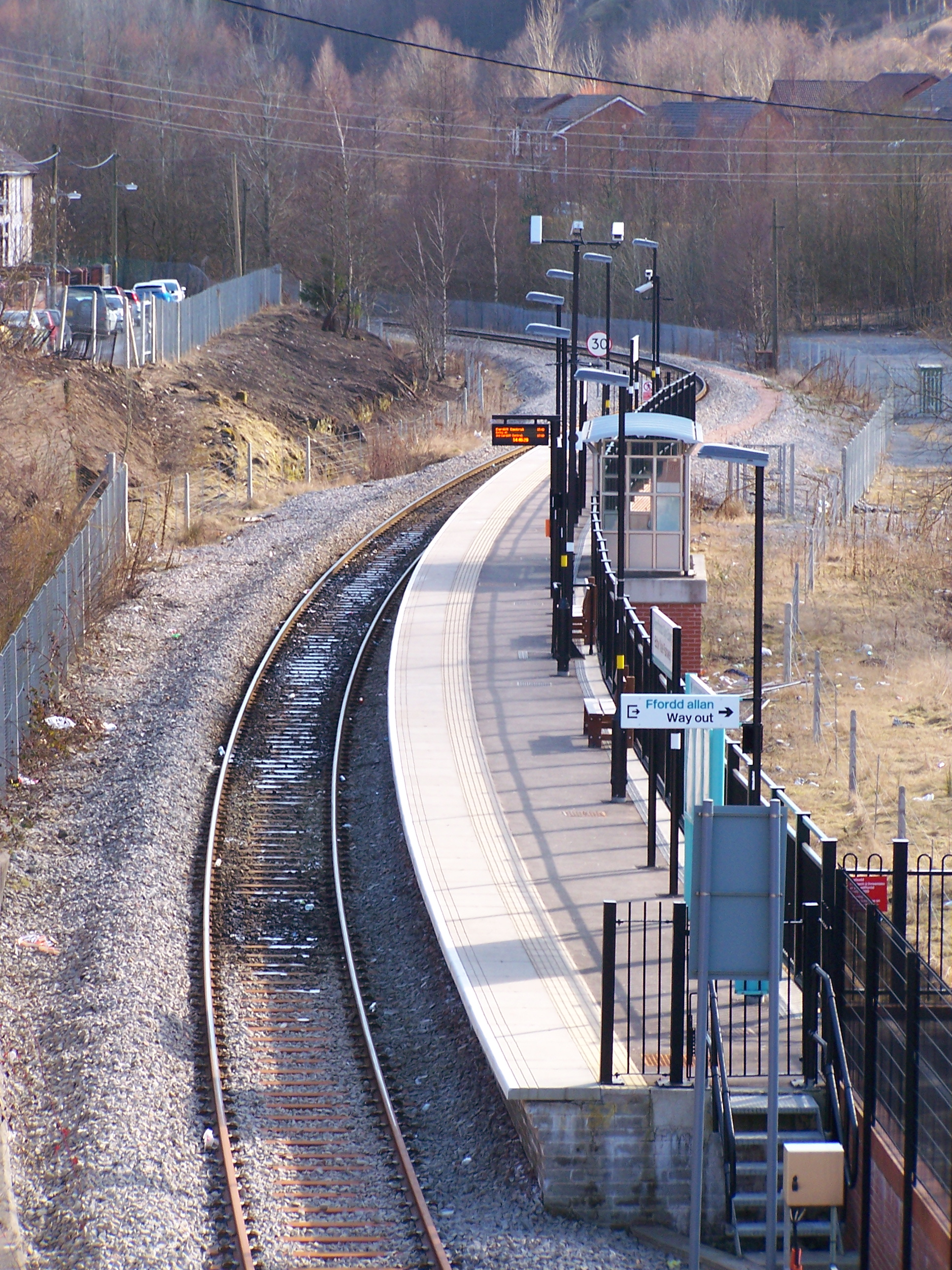
Ebbw Vale Parkway railway station in 2010

A railway service to Cardiff Central began on 6 February 2008, with trains serving the town from the new Ebbw Vale Parkway railway station. An extension of the line to a new northern terminus, Ebbw Vale Town, was opened on 17 May 2015.

The A465 Heads of the Valleys Road runs just to the north with direct access to the town and its industrial estates.

A direct hourly service between Ebbw Vale and Newport started in January 2024.

=== Funiculars ===
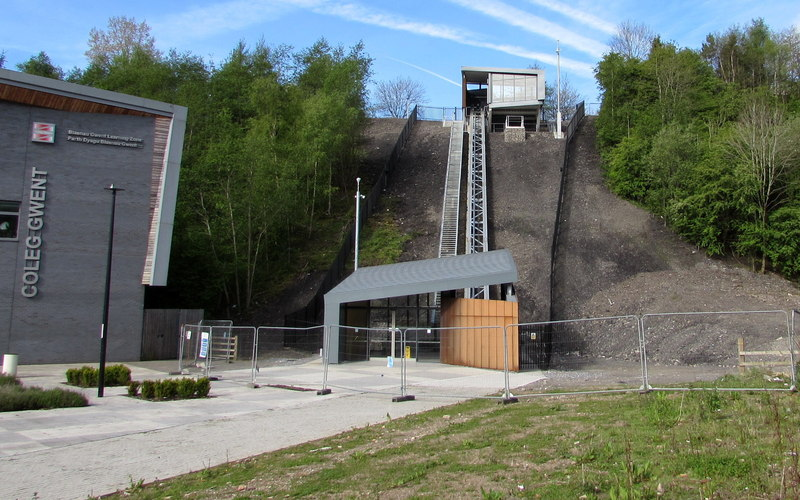
The Ebbw Vale Cableway

A kilometre-long funicular was part of the Garden Festival in 1992, but closed afterwards. In June 2015 a new inclined elevator, the Ebbw Vale Cableway, was opened. The lift was built by ABS Transportbahnen (Doppelmayr/Garaventa Group). Its length is 57 metres (187 ft) and it has a vertical lift of 24 metres (79 ft). It has one car and operates from Monday to Friday, 7 am to 7 pm fully automatically, without attendants. The short, 20-second, journey is free to travel and it is intended to improve access between levels in the town, from 'The Works' site and Coleg Gwent, up to the town centre. The Works site is the site of the old steelworks and the current focus of much redevelopment for the area.

Reception of the funicular has been mixed. Commentators and journalists have described it variously as a funicular, mechanical lift, 'cable car' [sic] and more derisively as a 'Stannah stairlift'. Most criticism has focussed on the £2.3 million cost, at a time when Blaenau Gwent council are facing a £10M deficit and other services in the area are facing substantial cuts. The project was funded through the Welsh European Funding Office (WEFO) with most of the money being European-sourced and the local council providing around a third. Operating costs have been cited as £16,000 per year, and these too have been questioned – especially regarding any teething troubles in the first year, or the costs of the inevitable vandalism repair. The need for the lift has also been questioned on health grounds, although there is good justification for this on disability access grounds and also encouraging movement between levels as part of encouraging development.

Vandalism a week after opening caused it to close temporarily.

In April 2023, it was announced that the cableway was to close. This decision was reversed when the council obtained funding from undisclosed sources.

== Notable people ==
- Nathan Wyburn, pop culture artist
- Jeff Banks, fashion designer
- Sir Frederick Brundrett, civil servant and mathematician
- Clive Burgess, rugby player for both Wales and Ebbw Vale RFC
- Dai Davies, Welsh politician and independent MP
- Myrtle Devenish, actress
- Joseph Duffy (born 1988), Irish-born mixed martial artist
- Michael Foot, MP for the Ebbw Vale constituency from 1960 to 1992
- David Garner, political artist
- Nicky Grist, rally co-driver
- Brian Hibbard, singer and actor
- Alan Hywel Jones, materials scientist and inventor
- Steve Jones, athlete, world marathon record-holder
- Adam Llewellyn, animation director and writer
- Jackson Page, under-18 World Snooker Champion
- Jemima Phillips, harpist
- Arthur Smith, rugby player for the British Lions, Scotland and Ebbw Vale RFC
- Victor Spinetti, actor, born in Cwm
- Mark Williams, snooker player, born in Cwm
- Bethan Witcomb, actress
