= Beaufort Theatre =

Theatre in Blaenau Gwent, Wales

Coordinates: 51.798°N 3.203°W

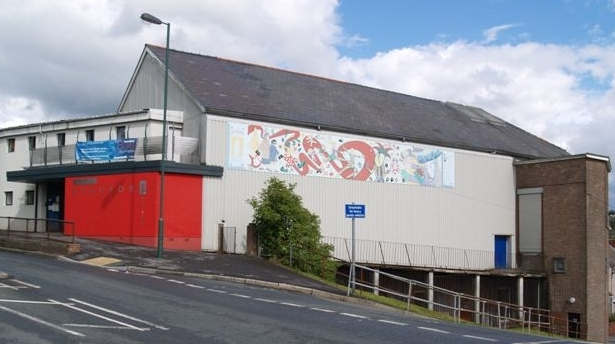

The Beaufort Theatre is the principal theatre in Blaenau Gwent in Ebbw Vale, Wales.

Until 2 April 2017 it was part of the Blaenau Gwent Venues, which also includes The Market Hall Cinema and Metropole Theatre, and formerly the Abertillery Community Theatre. Taken over by a community group on 3 April 2017, it is still available for hire to amateur groups. It has a 338-seat auditorium and a ballroom. It has a proscenium arched stage with an apron. The stage has some flying available, with 12 hemp sets with maximum flown height of 16 ft. Lighting bars can be lowered via winch, and front-of-house bars are fixed to the ceilings and walls.

The venue used to programme professional theatre, music, contemporary dance and light entertainment. It is also host to nine voluntary arts organisations who mount their annual productions there. The theatre was originally a cinema. It was converted back in the 1960s. Many famous bands have played in the ballroom before becoming successful, including Mott the Hoople and The Stereophonics.
