= Kuso (film) =

2017 film by Flying Lotus

- Promotional poster
- Directed by: Steve
- Written by: Steve; David Firth; Zack Fox
- Produced by: Eddie Alcazar
- Starring: Iesha Coston; Zack Fox; Buttress; Shane Carpenter; Oumi Zumi; Mali Matsuda; Tim Heidecker; Hannibal Buress; Donnell Rawlings; Anders Holm; Regan Farquhar; David Firth; George Clinton
- Cinematography: Danny Hiele; Benjamin Goodman; Norm Li
- Edited by: Lucas Lynch
- Music by: Flying Lotus; Aphex Twin; Akira Yamaoka
- Production companies: Brainfeeder Films; XYZ Films
- Distributed by: Brainfeeder Films
- Release dates: January 21, 2017 (Sundance); July 21, 2017 (United States)
- Running time: 92 minutes
- Country: United States
- Language: English

Kuso (Note: The title Kuso is derived from the Japanese word 糞 (くそ), a vulgar term meaning "feces". The kanji 糞 is also incorporated into the film's logo.) is a 2017 American film directed by Flying Lotus (credited as Steve), who co-wrote the screenplay with David Firth and Zack Fox. The anthology film follows several mutated survivors as they navigate the aftermath of a devastating earthquake in Los Angeles through a series of increasingly bizarre situations. It is divided into four interconnected stories and features elements of post-apocalyptic fiction, body horror, science fantasy, surreal comedy, and toilet humor, alongside musical and animated sequences. The film received mixed reviews from critics.

== Plot ==
Kuso depicts mutated survivors of an earthquake that has destroyed Los Angeles, with the narrative interspersed with television broadcasts, animations, musical performances, and news reports about the disaster. The news coverage is initially interrupted by Busdriver, who performs a jazz spoken-word piece describing the earthquake.

=== Royal ===
- Written by Steven Ellison

Missy and Kenneth are lovers who live in an apartment complex. On their first appearance, Missy is seen choking Kenneth as he masturbates, then singing him to sleep. However, Missy covers her neck with a cloth, and refuses to let Kenneth perform sexual acts on her. Kenneth attempts to play the piano for her to sing, but another voice joins them; Missy finally removes the cloth to reveal a talking boil on her neck. After initial revulsion, the boil talks Kenneth into letting it perform fellatio on him; he agrees, and they do so. Afterward, Kenneth responds in pleasure, having learned to enjoy the boil's presence, and names it Royal.

=== Mr. Quiggle ===
- Written by Steven Ellison and Zack Fox

Up-and-coming rapper B lives in an apartment with interdimensional creatures Kazo and Mazu. After smoking from a bong and watching what appears to be a snuff film with them, B goes to the bathroom to take a pregnancy test but is forced to hide it when Phil, a man who raped B and got her pregnant, appears through her toilet. Having tested positive, B goes to Dr. Clinton's clinic for an abortion, where she meets Manuel, who is cured of his fear of breasts by Mr. Quiggle, a large bug living in Clinton's anus. B is offered a coat hanger for her abortion and leaves in disgust. She visits Phil to tell him she is pregnant, but Phil refuses to let her get an abortion; Kazo and Mazu subdue Phil and trap him within one of B's music videos. They then remove the fetus from B's body, and B suggests that they smoke the fetus.

=== Smear ===
- Written by Steven Ellison

Charlie is a man who goes to an exclusive college in the forest and is fed terrible food by his mother, which causes him to constantly need to defecate. Laughed out of his classroom for doing so in his pants, Charlie runs into the forest, where he finds a strange creature with only an anus-like orifice with a worm-like tongue. He feeds the creature some of his feces, which causes it to apparently evolve, growing a face in place of its tongue. On their second meeting, the creature transfers a beam of green light to Charlie's head, empowering him to stop going to school and overcome his mother at last. Charlie later feeds the creature dog feces, which causes it and its apparent offspring to vanish, leaving Charlie and the dog standing in the forest.

=== Sock ===
- Written by David Firth and Steven Ellison

Angel, a Japanese woman crawling on the ground and eating concrete, tells herself she needs to sacrifice her baby. The voice of God speaks to her and tells her that her baby is missing and she will find it down a hole that she claims leads to Hell. Angel crawls into the hole, but slips and falls all the way down. She witnesses another man being consumed by a creature in the hole and is yelled at by Jenny, an inhabitant of the hole world. Angel is swallowed by another creature in the hole; she travels down a long, surreal tunnel, before coming up out of the ground inside a creature similar to the one from Smear, witnessing a large object flying over Los Angeles.

After the credits, Busdriver performs another spoken-word piece about surviving the earthquake.

== Cast ==
Royal

- Iesha Coston as Missy
- Oumi Zumi as Kenneth
- David Firth as Royal (voice)

Mr. Quiggle

- Buttress as B
- Zack Fox as Manuel
- Hannibal Buress as Kazo (voice)
  - Kewon Vines as Kazo (performance)
- Tim Heidecker as Phil
- Donnell Rawlings as Mazu (voice)
  - Matt McCarthy as Mazu (performance)
- Diana Terranova as Pepper
- Manuel Vazquez as Julia
- Lexington Steele as Jody
- George Clinton as Doctor Clinton
- Guru Singh and Jimmy ScreamerClauz as patients

Smear

- Shane Carpenter as Charlie
  - Angel Deradoorian as Charlie (voice)
- Sandra R. Kisling as Michelle
- Anders Holm as Teacher

Sock

- Mali Matsuda as Angel
- Pretty Ricki Fontaine as Jenny
- David Firth as Roach Man
- Bob Heslip as Bob
- Byron Bowers as Smoking Roach

Additional cast

- Regan Farquhar as News Pirate
- Hugh Moore as Anchor 1
- Jen Saunderson as Anchor 2
- Krista Allen as Weathergirl

== Production ==
Flying Lotus initially developed the film from a five-minute animated concept with David Firth before expanding it into a feature-length project. He cited several Japanese films, including Funky Forest (2005), Meatball Machine (2005), and Tetsuo: The Iron Man (1989), as influences on its style.

Flying Lotus and Firth had previously collaborated on the music video for "Ready Err Not". Winston Hacking contributed animation to the film's interstitial sequences and later directed and animated the music video for "Post Requisite", which expands upon an animated segment featured in the film.

== Music ==
The film features a score by Flying Lotus alongside British electronic musician Aphex Twin and Japanese composer Akira Yamaoka. A number of other musicians contributed to, or played on the score, including Thundercat, Kamasi Washington, Miguel Atwood-Ferguson, Dennis Hamm, Dante Winslow, Niki Randa, Brandon Coleman, Busdriver, Buttress, and Angel Deradoorian, the latter three of which also perform in the film. A soundtrack album is forthcoming with no known date of release.

== Release ==
The film premiered at Sundance Film Festival on January 21, 2017. The screening reportedly prompted numerous audience walkouts, with Flying Lotus later stating that "only like 20 people out of like 400" had left.

In June 2017, Flying Lotus announced that the film would be released on Shudder on July 21, alongside a limited theatrical release. Shudder acquired distribution rights to the film in North America, Ireland, and the United Kingdom ahead of its release.

== Reception ==
On the review aggregator website Rotten Tomatoes, 32% of 22 critics' reviews are positive, with an average rating of 4.60/10. Metacritic, which uses a weighted average, assigned the film a score of 51 out of 100, based on 11 critics, indicating "mixed or average" reviews.

Jake Nevins of The Guardian similarly described the film as largely nonsensical and grotesque, while noting its occasional visual appeal and use of dark humour. Simon Abrams of RogerEbert.com gave the film 2.5 out of 4 stars, describing it as "a surreal collection of comedy sketches that was often loud and monotonous, but still worth watching." He also praised its individual sequences and considered it a promising feature debut for Flying Lotus. John DeFore of The Hollywood Reporter gave the film a negative review, warning that its graphic imagery and excessive gore would likely repel even viewers accustomed to monster films. Chris Plante of The Verge described the film as "the grossest movie ever made", criticizing its graphic imagery and provocative humor.
