= Rassa Railroad =

Former horse-drawn tramroad in south Wales

The Rassa Railroad was a horse-drawn tramroad in south Wales, running between Sirhowy Ironworks and Beaufort Ironworks, with connections also to the Trefil Rail Road and the Ebbw Vale Ironworks. It was later served with a tram engine.

== History ==
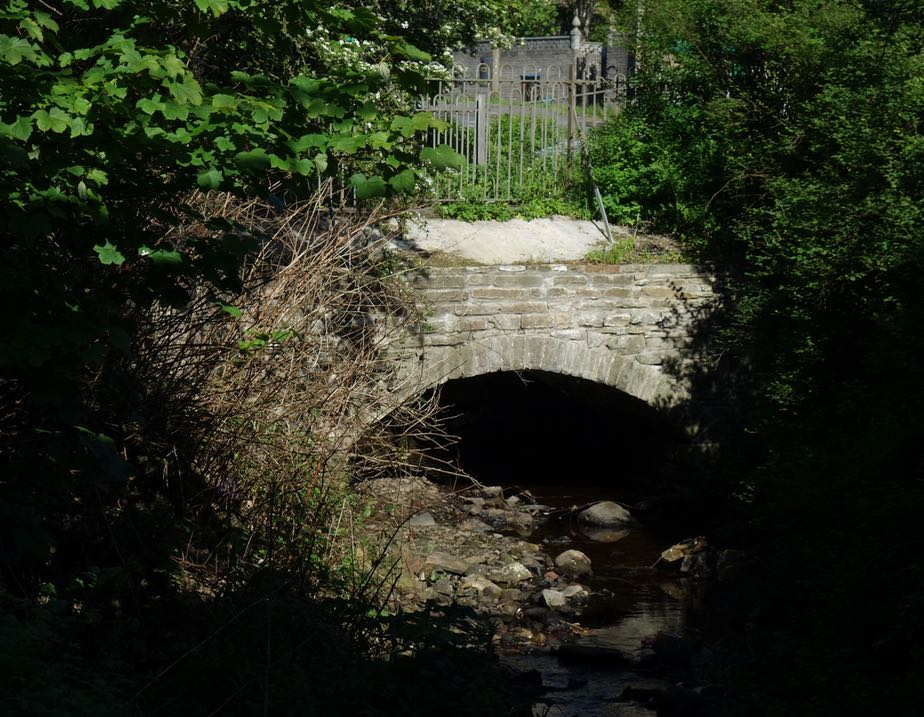
Rassa Railroad bridge over the Rasa Brook (SO160115)

The Rassa Railroad opened in 1794 as an edge railway of approximately 3 ft 4 in (1,016 mm) gauge. It was laid out by Thomas Dadford, engineer of the Monmouthshire Canal Co., which owned the line. After a few years it was converted to a 4 ft 2 in (1,270 mm) gauge plateway. A tram engine was used on the route from 1829. At some point the owner of the Rhymney Ironworks also secured running rights over the Rassa line.

== Route ==
The railway ran for 2 1/2 miles (4.0 km), directly north from Sirhowy then east through the village of Rassau to Beaufort. At Trevil Machine (location of a weighing machine), where the line turned sharply to the east, a junction was made with the Trefil Rail Road from the limestone quarries at Trefil. A further junction with the Trefil line at Shop Row led to the Ebbw Vale Ironworks at Pont-y-Gof. There was at least one viaduct. Sirhowy was also served by the Sirhowy continuation of the Nine Mile Point Tramroad.

The recommended carrying weight was up to 45 long cwt (5,000 lb or 2,300 kg) per set of wheels, but loadings of up to 3 long tons (6,700 lb; 3,000 kg) of iron were noted. Other materials carried included coal and limestone.

== Today ==
The former tramroad lies within Blaenau Gwent, now passing communities such as Rassau, Carmeltown and Glyncoed. The former tramroad permanent way is represented now by areas of tarmac and pathways. There is at least one surviving stone bridge.
