= Ebbw Vale Garden Festival Funicular =

Coordinates: 51°45′0.77″N 3°11′41.61″W

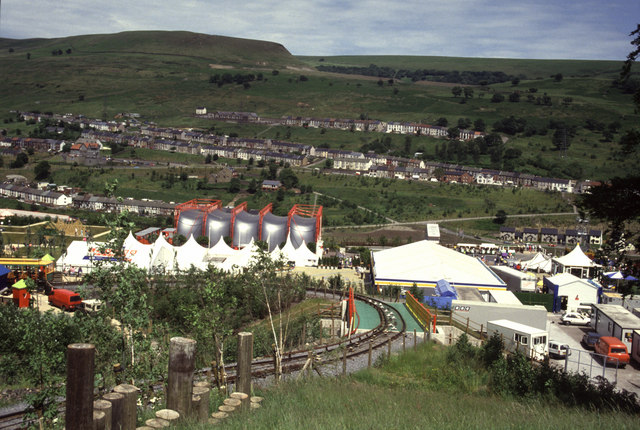
The Garden Festival site, with the funicular track in the foreground

The Ebbw Vale Garden Festival Funicular was a funicular railway built to carry visitors around the Ebbw Vale Garden Festival in 1992.

The funicular was intended as a viewpoint across the festival site, as much as a means of transport between levels, and so at 920 metres (3,020 ft) it was quite long by funicular standards although had only a short rise of 72 metres (236 ft). The route meandered in a rough S shape, so that passengers on both sides could see the view across the site. The 3 ft 6 in (1,067 mm) gauge cars were open-sided, with toast-rack seating. The two trains each had three 8-metre (26 ft) cars and could seat 96 people. Gradients were 1:9 overall, with a maximum of 1:5 and flat areas at the end stations and passing loop. With a journey time of 4 1/2 minutes, it could move a target maximum of 1,000 people per hour.

The track layout was a conventional two rail funicular with a central passing loop. The points were fixed and the outside wheels of each car were double-flanged, to guide the cars through the loop. Operation was with a single loop winding cable and semi-balanced trains, but unusually the electric winding drum was at the lower station. If unbalanced in the descending direction, the winding motor could be used for regenerative braking and fed electricity back into the site supply, an advanced feature for the early '90s. The stations were unstaffed and the automatic control was started via radio by the driver of the descending car.

The funicular was the first to be built in the UK since 1902. Its track and rolling stock was British-built by WGH Ltd of Old Edlington, who were in the coal-mining area near Doncaster and experienced in cable railways. It cost around £700,000 (£1,800,000 in 2023 money) to build.

At the close of the festival the funicular was offered for sale at around £200,000 but it is understood there was no sale and it was scrapped on site.

== See also ==
- Ebbw Vale Cableway
