= Ebbw Vale Garden Festival =

Garden festival in Wales

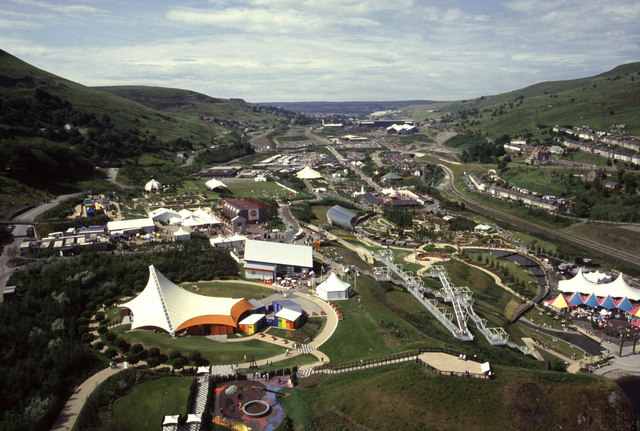
- Gryff, the festival mascot
- Genre: National Garden Festival
- Dates: 1 May 1992 until 4 October 1992
- Locations: Ebbw Vale, Blaenau Gwent, Wales
- Coordinates: 51.749°N 3.194°W

The Ebbw Vale Garden Festival of Wales (National Garden Festival 1992) attracted over two million visitors to Ebbw Vale in South Wales.

== Background ==
The national garden festivals were a high-profile 1980s initiative by the then Conservative government in response to criticism of their alleged neglect of areas hit by the decline of heavy industry. Environment Minister Michael Heseltine proposed that derelict land should be reclaimed for a Garden Festival as a symbol of the rebirth of such areas. The festivals were held every two years. The first such festival was held in Liverpool in 1984. Subsequent festivals were held in Stoke-on-Trent (1986), Glasgow (1988), Gateshead (1990) and Ebbw Vale Garden Festival (1992) which eventually won the competition. The festivals were highly successful in attracting millions of visitors from all over the country to industrial areas long ignored by British tourists. However they did not always lead to the hoped-for long-term injection of private investment in the affected areas.

== Legacy ==
The Festival Park site is identifiable today but little of the festival infrastructure remains. The lakes at the lower part of the site are the most obvious relic. The upper end of the funicular is now a retail park.

Of the five National Garden Festivals, none of them saw the hoped-for boom in development immediately after closure. Those closest to a busy urban area, particularly Gateshead, did see some housing development but in all cases this was driven by pre-existing local economic strength, rather than any long-term planning around the festival, or any knock-on benefits. In many cases, it was nearly 20 years before anything like the full site was under development.

The Festival Park (Garden Festival) site is now occupied by over 1,000 houses, a fishing lake, Festival Church, an owl sanctuary, a large environmental sculpture of Mother Earth, woodlands and a shopping centre.

== Clock ==
"In the Nick of Time" clock

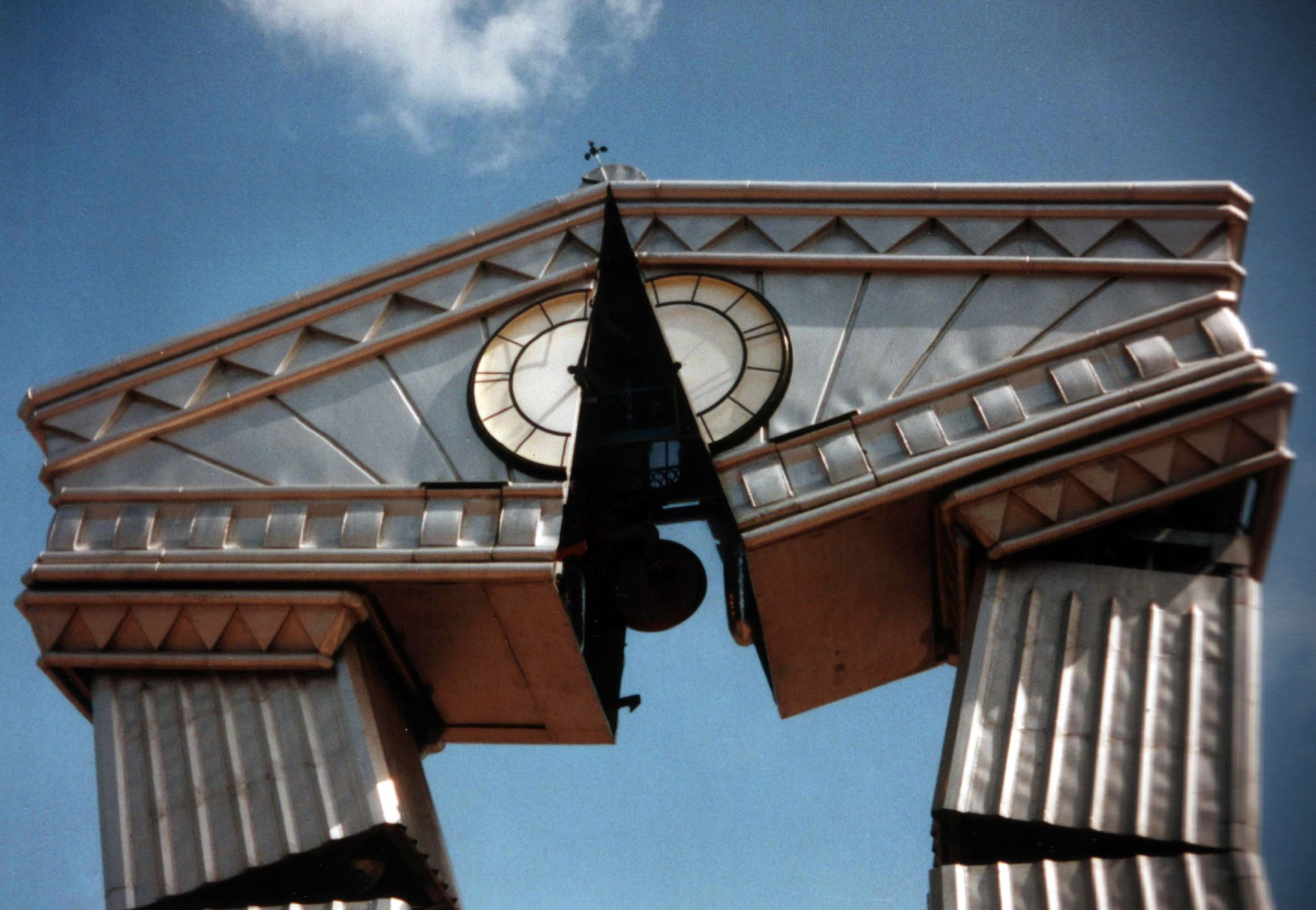
The "collapsible" clock in the Ebbw Vale Garden Festival

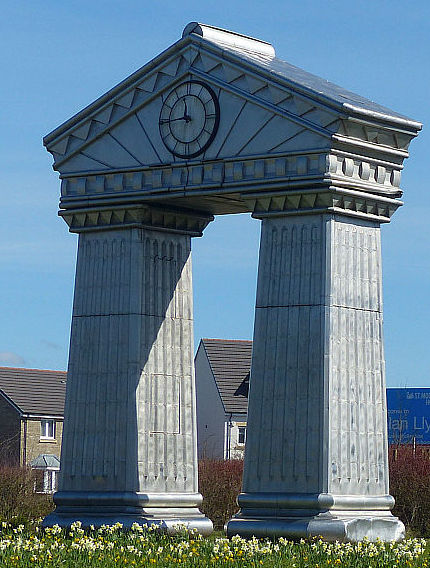
The clock now in Newport

A mechanical clock known as “In the Nick of Time” by sculptor Andy Plant was erected on the site. The clock was commissioned and paid for by Newport Council at a cost of £100,000. On the hour, the structure would open to expose the hidden characters inside. After the festival event the clock was relocated to John Frost Square, Newport. The clock is currently located on the roundabout leading to the Glan Llyn development behind Newport Retail Park in Newport. The clock no longer opens.

== See also ==
- Ebbw Vale Garden Festival Funicular
