= The Golden Cobra =

BBC Three comedy series

- Genre: Comedy
- Written by: Adam Llewellyn; James Prygodzicz; Thomas Rees
- Directed by: Adam Llewellyn
- Starring: Jeff Mirza; James Prygodzicz; Mark John; Adam Llewellyn; Thomas Rees; Sonal Fricker; Steve Ballinger; Shaila Mudhoo; Lizzie Luke; Laura Dagleish; Stuart Ashen; David Firth; John Rutledge; Josh Hooper
- Theme music composer: Adam Harvey; Gavin Robinson
- Opening theme: The Golden Cobra Theme Tune
- No. of seasons: 2
- No. of episodes: 20

Production
- Executive producers: Paul Forde; Ben Caudell; Navi Lamba
- Producers: Sarah Breese; Dan Thomas

Original release
- Network: BBC Three
- Release: 16 August 2024 – present

The Golden Cobra is a 2024 BBC Three animated comedy series written and created by Adam Llewellyn, James Prygodzicz and Thomas Rees. The series premiered on 16 August 2024 and was produced by BBC Cymru Wales and is a spin-off of the cult YouTube web-series "The Vale" produced by the same team. The series features the voices of Jeff Mirza, David Firth, Stuart Ashen, Josh Hooper and Goldie Lookin' Chain frontman, John Rutledge, Diane Morgan and Troma Entertainment founder, Lloyd Kaufman.

== Synopsis ==
Fresh out of prison and trying to start over, Nick takes the only available job at The Golden Cobra, the worst takeaway in Ebbw Vale, run by psychopath Basil and his normal family.

== Cast ==
- Jeff Mirza as Basil Abassi
- Mark John as Jub Abassi
- James Prygodzicz as Nick
- Sonal Fricker as Samita Abassi
- Shaila Mudhoo as Mona Abassi
- Adam Llewellyn as Rhys, Bighead, Martin Bastard, Kermit etc.
- Thomas Rees as Connor
- Steve Ballinger as Bennett
- Lizzie Luke as Claire, Bigbird etc.
- Altaf Shah as Ernish
- David Firth as Rose West, Michael Sheen etc.
- Stuart Ashen as Dr. Goode
- Laura Dagleish as Miss Port
- John Rutledge as Scott Quinnell, Mr. Probert etc.
- Josh Hooper as PC Justin
- Bill Bellamy as PC Keith
- Ieuan Rhys as PC Crabtree
- Sloane Harrison as Spalding
- Lily Prygodzicz as Trina

== Production ==
The Golden Cobra was first produced as a pilot for BBC Wales' 2021, Festival of Funny. Due to a popular audience response and ratings, a series of eight 12-14 minute episodes were commissioned by BBC in 2022.

On 21st May, 2025, a second series consisting of 12 episodes was announced as part of BBC Comedy Festival in Belfast to be released at some point in 2026.

== Broadcast ==
The series was broadcast over four weeks as double bills from the 16th of August 2024 - 6th September 2024 late night on BBC Three and BBC One Wales, with a day one drop of all eight episodes on BBC iPlayer.

== Episodes ==
=== Series One (2024) ===
No. overall	No. in Series	Title	Directed by	Written by	Original air date
1	1	"All Good Here"	Adam Llewellyn	Adam Llewellyn, James Prygodzicz & Thomas Rees	16th August, 2024
2	2	"Pigeon Toss"	Adam Llewellyn	Adam Llewellyn, James Prygodzicz & Thomas Rees	16th August, 2024
3	3	"Precious Cargo"	Adam Llewellyn	Adam Llewellyn, James Prygodzicz & Thomas Rees	23rd August, 2024
4	4	"Truth or Dare?"	Adam Llewellyn	Adam Llewellyn, James Prygodzicz & Thomas Rees	23rd August, 2024
5	5	"A Massive Waste of Time"	Adam Llewellyn	Adam Llewellyn, James Prygodzicz & Thomas Rees	30th August, 2024
6	6	"A Big Step"	Adam Llewellyn	Adam Llewellyn, James Prygodzicz & Thomas Rees	30th August, 2024
7	7	"Broken Saddle"	Adam Llewellyn	Adam Llewellyn, James Prygodzicz & Thomas Rees	6th September, 2024
8	8	"A Titan of Rugby"	Adam Llewellyn	Adam Llewellyn, James Prygodzicz & Thomas Rees	6th September, 2024

=== Series Two (2026) ===
No. overall	No. in Series	Title	Directed by	Written by	Original air date	Notes
9	1	"Chops"	Adam Llewellyn	Adam Llewellyn, James Prygodzicz & Thomas Rees	26th September, 2026	Special Guest voice: Lloyd Kaufman
10	2	"Nick's Brother..."	Adam Llewellyn	Adam Llewellyn, James Prygodzicz & Thomas Rees	26th September, 2026	
11	3	"One-Star Review"	Adam Llewellyn	Adam Llewellyn, James Prygodzicz & Thomas Rees	26th September, 2026	
12	4	"Nick's Dilemma"	Adam Llewellyn	Adam Llewellyn, James Prygodzicz & Thomas Rees	26th September, 2026	
13	5	"The Boy Who Found the Wasp's Nest"	Adam Llewellyn	Adam Llewellyn, James Prygodzicz & Thomas Rees	26th September, 2026	
14	6	"Jub's Girlfriend"	Adam Llewellyn	Adam Llewellyn, James Prygodzicz & Thomas Rees	26th September, 2026	
15	7	"Coal Hole"	Adam Llewellyn	Adam Llewellyn, James Prygodzicz & Thomas Rees	26th September, 2026	
16	8	"Miss Port's Party"	Adam Llewellyn	Adam Llewellyn, James Prygodzicz & Thomas Rees	26th September, 2026	
17	9	"The College Gig"	Adam Llewellyn	Adam Llewellyn, James Prygodzicz & Thomas Rees	26th September, 2026	
18	10	"Riding in Cars With Boyos"	Adam Llewellyn	Adam Llewellyn, James Prygodzicz & Thomas Rees	26th September, 2026	
19	11	"Exceedingly Good Boiler Cover"	Adam Llewellyn	Adam Llewellyn, James Prygodzicz & Thomas Rees	26th September, 2026	
20	12	"Chef's Special"	Adam Llewellyn	Adam Llewellyn, James Prygodzicz & Thomas Rees	26th September, 2026	Special Guest voice: Diane Morgan

== Recognition ==
Series	Awards	Category	Other nominees	Result	Ref.
1	Comedy.co.uk Awards 2024	Best Comedy	Daddy Issues; Smoggie Queens; The Completely Made-Up Adventures Of Dick Turpin; Mammoth; Things You Should Have Done	Nominated	
1	RTS Cymru Awards	Best Comedy	Mammoth	Won	
1	Celtic Media Festival	Best Animation	A Wind and the Shadow; Boban is Fuigheag; Li Ban	Nominated	
1	BAFTA Cymru Awards	Breakthrough Cymru	Cleddau; Finding Hope	Won	
1	BAFTA Cymru Awards	Entertainment Programme	Llond Bol o Sbaen; Sgwrs Dan Y Lloer: Noel Thomas; Y Llais	Won	
