= Adam Llewellyn =

Welsh animator (born 1989)

Adam Llewellyn (born 5 March 1989) is a Welsh animator, writer, director, editor and actor. He is the co-creator of BBC Three comedy series The Golden Cobra as well as cult animated web-series The Vale.

== Early life ==
Llewellyn was born and grew up in Ebbw Vale, Blaenau Gwent, Wales. In 2007 while studying at University of South Wales, Newport he met future collaborator Thomas Rees.

== Career ==
In 2019 while working as a teacher, Llewellyn created his web-series The Vale which spanned three seasons on YouTube which he co-wrote with James Prygodzicz, Thomas Rees and Steve Ballinger. Due to the local success of the series, Llewellyn along with Prygodzicz was asked to create a spin-off pilot for BBC Wales' Festival of Funny which lead to the creation of The Golden Cobra.

In 2024, The Golden Cobra aired its first full series on BBC Three and BBC One Wales.

== Filmography ==
=== Web-series ===
Year	Title	Role
2019-2023	The Vale	Creator, Writer, Animator, Director, Actor, Editor & Producer
2024	Eugene and Teddy	Actor

=== Television ===
Year	Title	Role
2024	The Golden Cobra	Creator, Writer, Animator, Director, Actor & Editor
2026	The Golden Cobra - Behind the Scenes	Himself
