= Gwent Archives =

Coordinates: 51.7774°N 3.2023°W

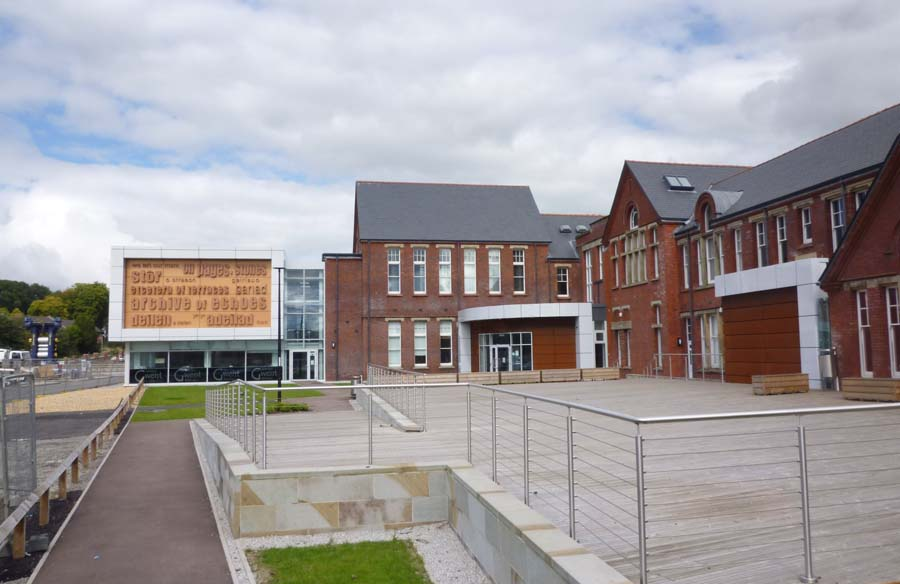
Gwent Archives building

Gwent Archives (Welsh: Archifau Gwent) is the local records office and genealogy centre, based in Ebbw Vale, South Wales for the historic county of Monmouthshire. It covers the modern local authority areas of Blaenau Gwent, Caerphilly County Borough, Monmouthshire, Newport and Torfaen.

== Background ==
Monmouthshire Record Office was established in 1938 at the Shire Hall in Newport. Following local government reorganisation in 1974, it became the Gwent County Record Office and moved to the newly built County Hall in Cwmbran. In October 2011 the record office moved from Cwmbran to a newly developed site in Ebbw Vale and was renamed Gwent Archives.

== Location ==
The Gwent Archives are housed in the Grade II* listed office buildings of Ebbw Vale Steelworks. The red brick building with its tall clock tower was built in 1915/6 for the Ebbw Vale Iron and Steel Company. In 2009 plans were approved for architects Stride Treglown to convert the building into a headquarters for Gwent Record Office, with a new extension, exhibition and educational facilities. The building was finished off with a bilingual poem specially written by the National Poet of Wales, Gillian Clarke, which is partially reproduced on the facade of the new extension.

== Holdings ==
Gwent Archives has two main strongrooms with 6 miles (10 km) of shelving, containing records going back as far as the 12th-century. The new wing has a double roof to help keep a stable temperature and environment. The Ebbw Vale Steelworks Archive Trust, a voluntary group which preserves the history of the industry in the area, is also based at the Archives.
