= MC Devvo =

English musician and comedian

- Also known as: Devvo, Darren Devonshire
- Born: Christian David Webb; November 1982 (age 43); Doncaster, South Yorkshire, England
- Genres: Comedy hip-hop UK Rap UK Hip Hop Ragga
- Occupations: Rapper; songwriter
- Years active: 2004–present
- Website: https://realdevvo.co.uk/

Christian Webb, better known by the stage name MC Devvo is an English rapper and comedian.

== Career ==
Webb came to public attention in 2004, when animator David Firth began posting videos of a Chav stereotype character named Devvo. In 2006, the Devvo character was featured on E4's Funny Cuts. Webb has also appeared in other projects with Firth playing various characters in his podcast Waller FM.

In 2007, he released the album From Yorkshire to New York.

In 2026, Devvo announced a comeback, including a United Kingdom tour. He collaborated with Brett Domino to write and produce a 2026 World Cup song, "Bring It Home".

== Personal life ==
In 2019, Webb was working at a school in Doncaster, and made headlines after being fired due to his connections to the Devvo character.

== Discography ==
=== Albums ===
Studio albums
Title	Details
From Yorkshire to New York	Released: 10 September 2007

=== Singles ===
Title	Year	Album
"Donny Soldier"	2007	From Yorkshire to New York
"Yorkshire 'til I Die"	2026	—
"Bring It Home" with Brett Domino	2026	—
