= Gateshead Garden Festival =

UK National Garden Festival of 1990

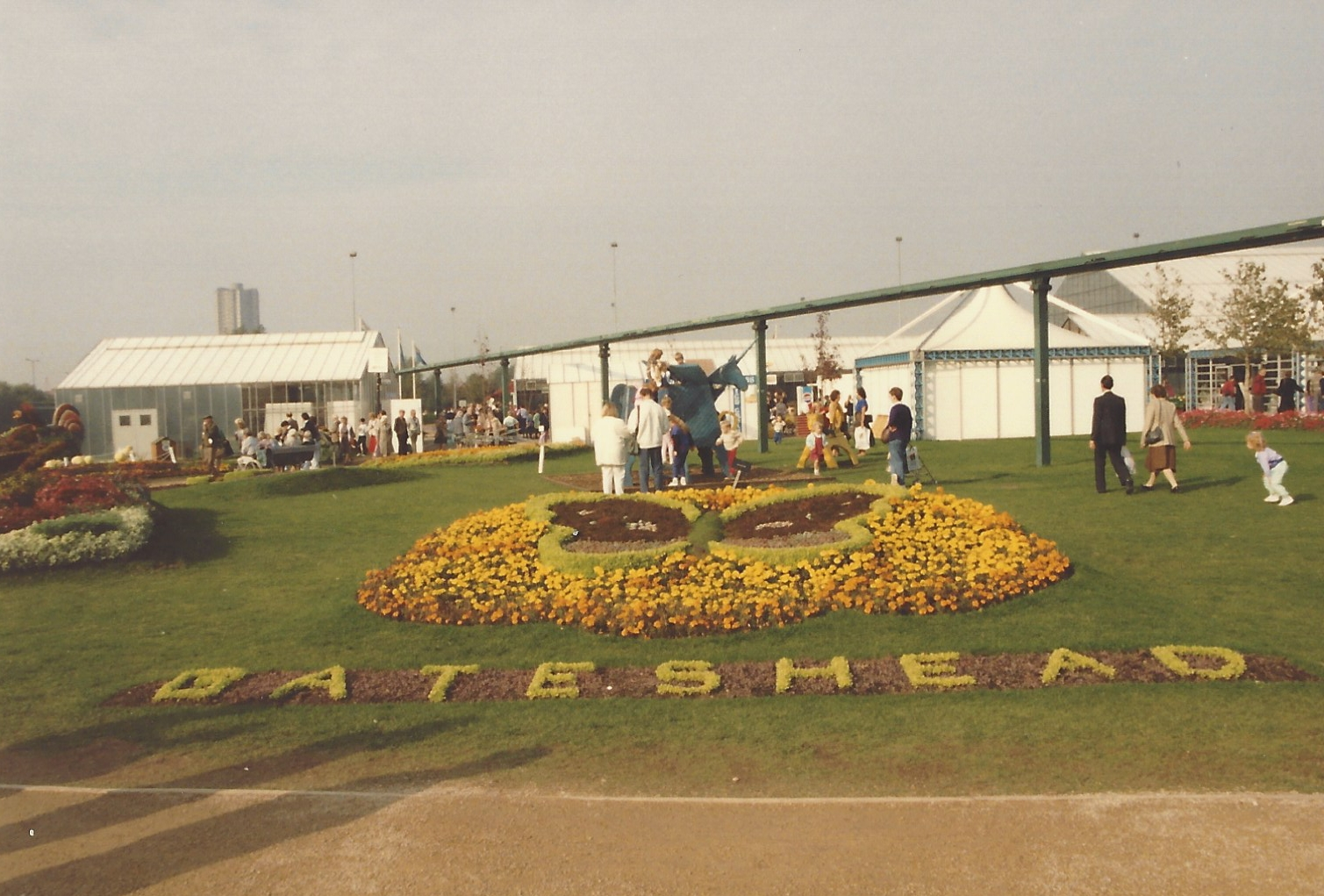
Butterfly display and monorail track

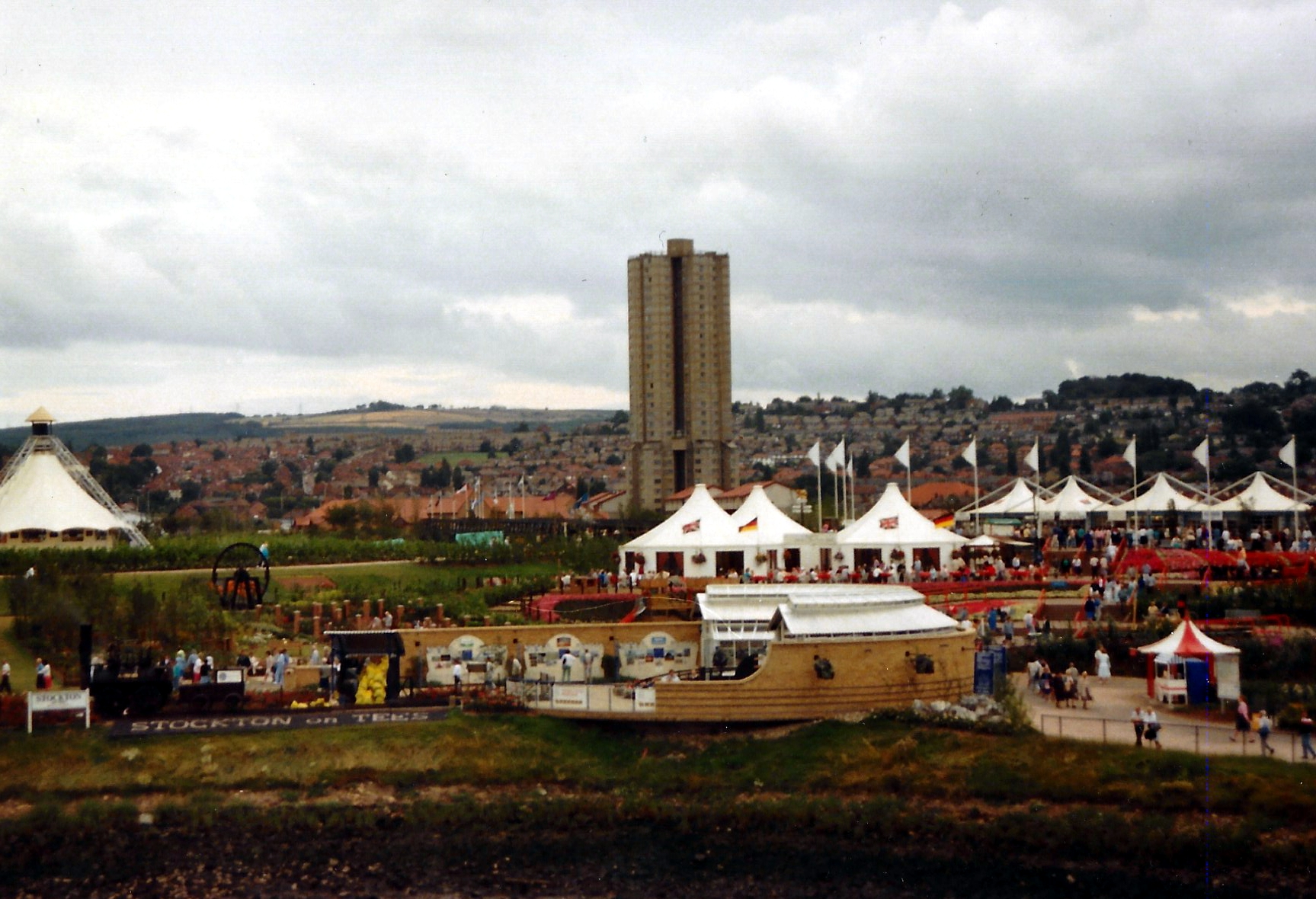
View of the site from Dunston staithes

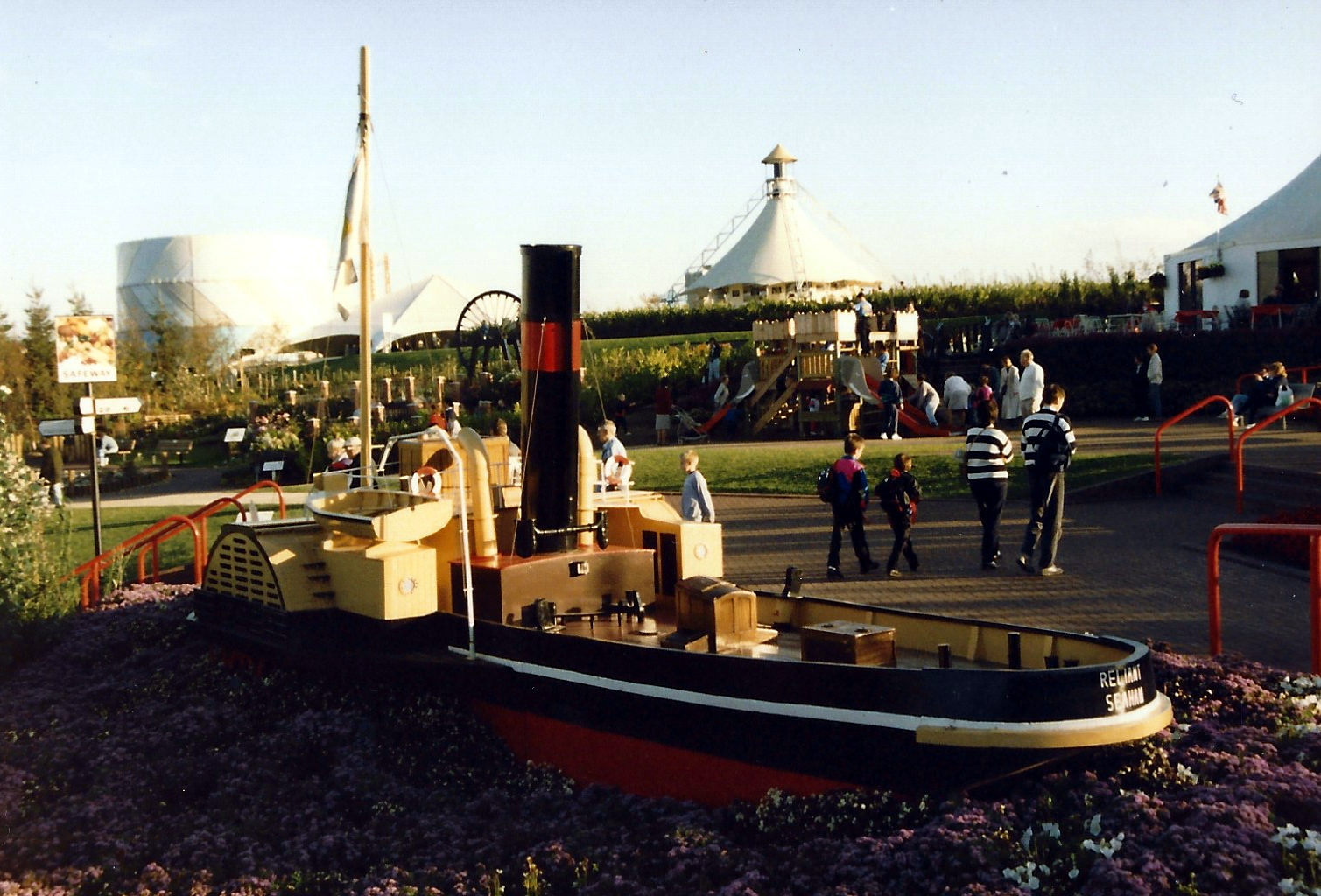
Model tug display

The Gateshead Garden Festival was the fourth of the United Kingdom's five national garden festivals. It was opened in May 1990 by Princess Anne and continued until October 1990, in Gateshead, Tyne and Wear. It lasted 157 days, and received over three million visitors. Attractions included public art displays, a Ferris wheel, and dance, music, theatre and sporting events. The site comprised four areas: Norwood, Riverside, Dunston and Eslington Park, and several modes of transport were provided around the site: a monorail which ran between Norwood and Eslington, a narrow gauge steam railway between Dunston and Redheugh, and a road train which covered the entire site. A ferry across the River Tyne, between Dunston Staiths and Newcastle Quayside, was also provided.

The festival site was created over a two-year period, on 200 acres (0.81 km^{2}) of derelict land, previously the site of a gasworks, a coal depot and a coking plant named Norwood Coke Works. The cost of reclaiming and redeveloping the land was around £37 million. The Evening Chronicle reported: "Around 50,000 cubic metres [1,800,000 cu ft] of discarded coal and coke over 25 acres [0.10 km^{2}] was removed and the area capped with layers of limestone. […] Nearly two million trees and shrubs and 1.2m bulbs were planted. Enough turf was laid to cover 1,000 domestic lawns and three tonnes of grass seed was sown. Five thousand previously unemployed people were trained for roles in the festival." After the festival ended, much of the site was replaced by housing, although still largely derelict. At the site, a pond was constructed named Norwood Pond, named for the area of the former cokeworks.

Reflecting on the Festival's 25th anniversary in 2015, the Evening Chronicle noted: "It is also held to have kick started a process which resulted in the Baltic centre, Sage Gateshead and the Millennium Bridge".

== Sources ==
- Webb, Jonathan CK (2009). Tyneside from the Air. Derby: Breedon Books Publishing Co Ltd. ISBN 9781 85983 683 5.
- Woodhouse, Robert (1992). Gateshead. A Pictorial History. Chichester: Phillimore & Co Ltd. ISBN 0 85033 825 5.
