= David Firth (animator) =

British animator (born 1983)

- Born: 1982 or 1983 (age 43–44); Doncaster, England
- Occupations: Animator; filmmaker

YouTube information
- Channel: David Firth
- Years active: 2006–present
- Subscribers: 2.1 million
- Views: 265 million
- Last updated: March 2026
- Website: fat-pie.com

David Firth (born 1982 or 1983) is an English animator, filmmaker, visual artist, musician, and voice actor. He is best known for creating the animated web series Salad Fingers (2004–present). He also co-wrote the horror comedy film Kuso (2017) and has directed various music videos and animated several segments of Charlie Brooker's Screenswipe. He has also provided voices for the series Smiling Friends (2020–2026).

== Early life ==
Firth was born in Doncaster, South Yorkshire, the son of artists Rosemary and Graham Firth. He began creating stop-motion animation when he was 13 years old, using Lego and other toys. He studied animation at the Hull campus of the University of Lincoln and further studied television and film.

== Career ==
In July 2004, Firth created the animated web series Salad Fingers, which was released on Newgrounds. The series was created using Adobe Flash; Firth became a notable figure in the medium of Flash animation. Ten episodes were released from 2004 to 2013, and an eleventh episode was released in 2019. Having accumulated roughly 110 million video views on YouTube as of 2020, the series is considered to have a cult following.

Since his start on Newgrounds, Firth has released several Flash animations, contributed animation to the BBC television series Charlie Brooker's Screenwipe, and has done voice acting in the Adult Swim animated series Smiling Friends and BBC Three animated series The Golden Cobra. Firth also co-created the comedy rapper character MC Devvo, a dimwitted chav performed by his friend Christian Webb, for a series of videos that satirised the music scene of Doncaster's white working class. In 2022, he contributed an animated segment to Justin Roiland's The Paloni Show! Halloween Special on Hulu. As of 2023, Firth has been developing a video game based on his animated series Jerry Jackson.

In 2014, he created the animated music video for the Flying Lotus song "Ready Err Not", which Pitchfork described as disturbing and highly graphic. Flying Lotus referred to Firth as one of his favourite animators. Firth also co-wrote the 2017 body horror feature film Kuso, which was co-written and directed by Flying Lotus. In 2016, he created the animated short film Cream, which tells the story of a scientist who creates a miracle cream that solves all of the world's problems until it gets out of control. It screened at Regent Street Cinema in London on 16 November that year and featured the voice of Flying Lotus. The two also co-directed the video for Flying Lotus' song "Fire Is Coming" featuring David Lynch.

== Style ==
Ryan Ball, writing for Animation Magazine, describes his animations as "a brilliant and original hodgepodge of hilarity, stupidity and unshakable creepiness". Jack Benjamin of Indy Film Library describes Firth's animation style as "purposefully immature" and notes his frequent use of photograph augmentation and collage techniques to achieve an uncanny valley effect. Firth says that he "[takes] inspiration from the unpredictability of dreams", and describes applying this style as difficult because of the lack of spontaneity in producing animation.
