= Salad Fingers =

British adult animated series

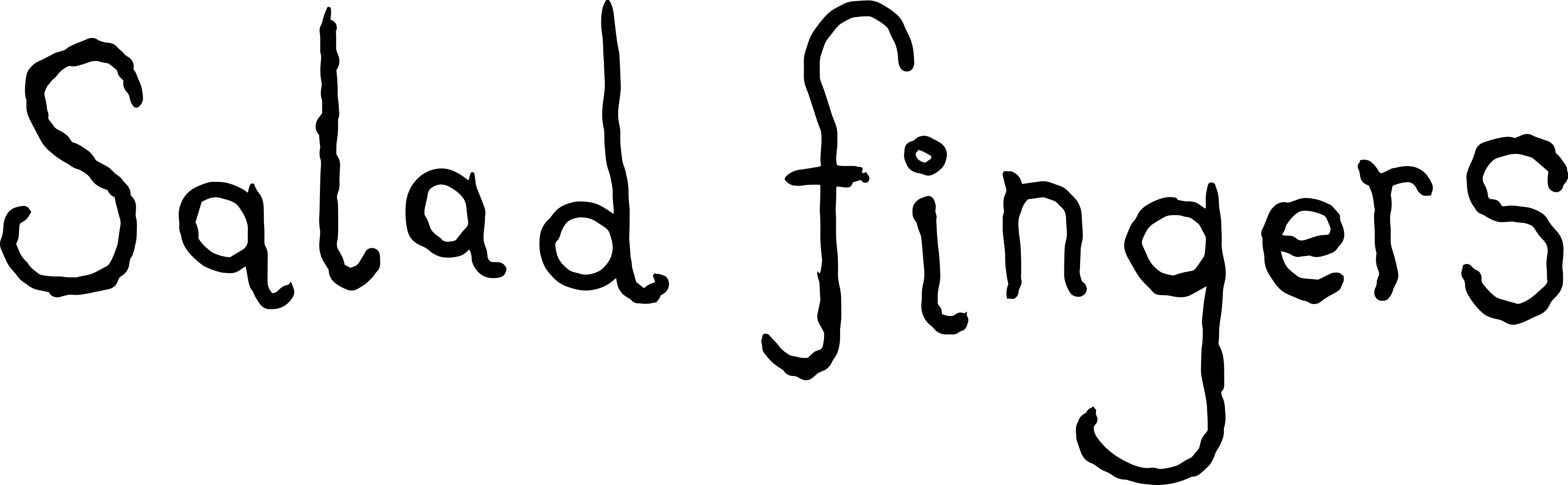
- Created by: David Firth; Christian Webb
- Written by: David Firth
- Directed by: David Firth
- Voices of: David Firth
- Country of origin: United Kingdom
- Original language: English
- No. of episodes: 14

Production
- Animator: David Firth

Original release
- Network: Newgrounds
- Release: 1 July 2004 – present

Salad Fingers is a British adult animated web series created by David Firth and Christian Webb in 2004. It revolves around the eponymous Salad Fingers, a thin, green humanoid creature with lettuce-like hands who inhabits a desolate world. As of September 2025, fourteen episodes have been published on YouTube and Newgrounds. The subject of a cult following, Salad Fingers has been described as a viral phenomenon and is considered a Flash animation classic.

== Development ==
Salad Fingers was conceived as an inside joke when one day, while Firth was playing the guitar, his friend and frequent collaborator Christian Webb commented that he had "salad fingers", referring to the way Firth played the C-chord. In 2004, Firth posted the first episode via Flash to entertainment website Newgrounds, where it was initially unpopular. However, the video quickly gained traction once it was featured on the website's front page. Later, once the series transitioned to video-sharing platform YouTube, Firth turned to crowdfunding because the platform's increasingly restrictive content policy prevented him from monetizing his videos. Firth has used Adobe Animate, formerly Adobe Flash, to create Salad Fingers episodes.

In addition to writing and animating the series, Firth voices the titular character himself. Firth says the character's voice was inspired by that of his grandmother's and Michael Jackson's speaking voice. The softness of Salad Fingers's voice is due to the circumstance that Firth did not want to wake up his parents while recording. While the first episode took Firth "one day and one night" to produce, others took him six months and up to one year. He has cited the works of David Lynch, Tim Burton, and Chris Morris, as well as The League of Gentlemen and South Park as sources of inspiration. Music featured in Salad Fingers episodes includes work credited to Sigur Rós, Aphex Twin, and Boards of Canada. Although the series has inspired numerous fan theories, ranging from speculation about an overarching plot involving a nuclear fallout to identifying hidden anagrams in characters' names, Firth has stated that the series has never been "mapped out" and that he never intended it to have an underlying meaning.

In 2007, the series, then spanning seven episodes, had its first public screening at Sydney Underground Film Festival, where all episodes were shown back to back. In 2009, episodes were screened at Glimmer, Hull Daily Mail's international short film festival. In 2020, a Salad Fingers tour throughout the United Kingdom was announced. The tour was postponed due to the COVID-19 pandemic and was ultimately held in 2021 and 2022. Events featured back-to-back screenings of all episodes released thus far, followed by an in-person interview with Firth.

== Episodes ==
No.	Title	Original release date	Length (minutes)
1	"Spoons"	1 July 2004	1:46
Salad Fingers explains how touching rust stimulates him, and that he holds a particular love of spoons. He asks a boy to see if he has any rusty spoons. The child responds in screeches, at which point Salad Fingers leaves.
2	"Friends"	15 July 2004	3:54
After talking to his finger puppets, Salad Fingers checks for a fish cooking in his oven. Unable to reach it, he asks a bystanding child to fetch it for him. As the child walks into the oven, Salad Fingers notices a rusty nail in the wall and reaches to caress it, causing the oven door to close. Salad Fingers then impales his finger with the nail and faints. He awakes from a dream in a pool of blood, and smoke is emerging from the oven.
3	"Nettles"	1 August 2004	3:18
Salad Fingers encounters a perambulator, places nettles inside of it, and takes it home with him. An armless man appears and chases after him, repeatedly banging his head against the front door. Meanwhile, Salad Fingers rubs the nettles on his chest, causing him to lactate. After awaking from a daydream, Salad Fingers finds the man lifeless in front of the door, hangs him on a meat hook, and offers him a glass of milk.
4	"Cage"	19 August 2004	5:16
A boy, who speaks only in growls and grunts, approaches Salad Fingers, which makes him uncomfortable. A tap connected to a string appears at Salad Fingers's door. It is pulled away, and Salad Fingers chases it. The boy catches him in a cage and offers him a ring, which Salad Fingers rejects. He then disappears from inside the cage and the boy starts crying. Salad Fingers flies away on a giant tap.
5	"Picnic"	25 November 2004	4:19
Salad Fingers talks to his finger puppet before attending a picnic with a crow and a girl. Salad Fingers asks the girl questions, but she does not respond. His finger puppet watches Salad Fingers through the window as he declares the girl his new playmate. The crow steals Salad Fingers's spoon, upon which the girl speaks to him for the first time. Salad Fingers screeches in shock.
6	"Present"	24 July 2005	4:09
One of Salad Fingers' finger puppets presents him with a toy horse, upon which Salad Fingers eats the puppet. He plays with the horse and finds a lone toilet outside. He talks to it and flushes it in concern. He walks back home and sees another version of himself inside, repeating what he had done earlier. The inside version of Salad Fingers goes on to eat his finger puppet and, finally, the other version of himself.
7	"Shore Leave"	28 January 2006	5:19
While digging holes outside, Salad Fingers finds an old corpse that he is familiar with. He pulls it out of the hole, promises to draw it a hot bath, and prepares a dinner of sand for it. Later in the day, Salad Fingers salutes the corpse, serenades it, and kicks it back into the hole crying. Salad Fingers suddenly stands on a stage singing in front of an audience before leaving.
8	"Cupboard"	22 September 2007	5:43
Salad Fingers tunes a radio and feeds it marbles. It suddenly starts emitting a piercing sound, upon which Salad Fingers flees into a small adjacent room. There, he finds a strand of hair, which he adds to his collection of hairs. Later, the radio instructs Salad Fingers to return its hair. It goes on to torment him, at which point Salad Fingers returns to the small room in tears.
9	"Letter"	26 May 2011	8:11
A tree begs Salad Fingers to let it stay in his house but is refused, prompting it to strangle Salad Fingers. Later, Salad Fingers awakes from his sleep in pain. A black mass erupts from his stomach, which he calls his child. While writing a letter, he talks to it and suddenly falls ill. Having recovered, Salad Fingers takes the mass to another house in a bucket and smears it across one of the windows.
10	"Birthday"	24 November 2013	10:01
While preparing a birthday party for a corpse he keeps, Salad Fingers discovers a tall pole in front of his house. He leaves and traverses a forest in search of a hand puppet. After he finds the puppet, it attacks a horse standing nearby. Salad Fingers returns to his house, which is now inhabited by horses. The corpse has skeletonized. Outside, several clones of Salad Fingers are gathered around a table. The pole retracts into the ground and reveals a present, which contains a hat made out of the corpse's skin.
11	"Glass Brother"	30 January 2019	14:38
Salad Fingers talks to his brother through a mirror while ridiculing one of his finger puppets. At home, he brings his finger puppet to life by sewing flesh onto it. Salad Fingers's mother appears in a mirror and demands to be served food, which he is unable to do. After being forced to eat food prepared by his mother, Salad Fingers's brother kidnaps his finger puppet through the mirror. Salad Fingers rescues it by entering the mirror dimension through a puddle outside and finally destroys the mirror.
12	"Post Man"	7 March 2022	8:57
Returning home from his job as a postman, Salad Fingers discovers the mutilated corpse of a dog. He initiates a courtship with it and takes it on several dates. After realizing that the corpse is much younger than himself, Salad Fingers carries it away and leaves it at a tree stump, declaring that they cannot be together. A creature emerges from the tree stump and drags it inside.
13	"Harvest"	20 September 2023	11:00
Salad Fingers is attempting to grow crops for an upcoming feast. Finding no crops growing, he sacrifices one of his finger puppets to the earth, and an enormous flower grows. He consumes one of its seeds, and a miniature Salad Fingers, dubbed "Mr. Boyfingers", sprouts from his back. After Salad Fingers teaches Mr. Boyfingers about the world, Mr. Boyfingers mortally injures him with a rock and cooks him—still alive—in a stew before eating him, taking his place.
14	"Crows"	1 September 2025	11:06
After a murder of crows attacks him at his magic show, Salad Fingers recounts a years-long feud between them that began when the crows started stealing his memories. One night, the crows break into his home and steal his eyes. With the help of his horse companion, whose head was stolen by the crows, a blinded Salad Fingers uses magic to chase off the crows and retrieve their stolen body parts. However, once back home, a crow steals Salad Fingers's final memory, leaving his mind blank.

== Reception and impact ==
Salad Fingers has become the subject of a cult following and has generated a number of memes, having "captured the comically demented and strange underbelly of the internet" according to Elijah Watson of The Daily Dot. The series's characters, themes, and setting have inspired extensive discussions and theories online. In 2005, the San Francisco Chronicle ranked it among its "Top 10" pop culture phenomena. Vulture and Wired respectively consider Salad Fingers to be one of the best and most memorable Flash animations, and The Guardian describes it as one of the first to go "fully viral". By 2020 the series was viewed 110 million times in total on YouTube, with the first episode alone receiving 36 million video views.

Jon Mendelsohn of Comic Book Resources observes that the series has "terrified audiences" by means of its "post-apocalyptic setting and crypticness" and compares it to the television series Twin Peaks. Tanner Fox of Screen Rant describes it as "nothing short of haunting" due to its "weird premises, nails-on-chalkboard background music, and shocking moments of gore and depravity". Devon Maloney of The Verge remarks its emphasis on gore and bodily fluids, calling it "basically ASMR for psychopaths". Will Ramsey of Hull Daily Mail calls it "comic, horrifying and strangely endearing". While David Bryant of We Are Cult deems the first episode "not terribly good", saying that it "relies solely on the shock of its absurdity", he considers subsequent episodes "gradually more sophisticated" as they "do a lot more to flesh out not just Salad Finger's character, but the world which he inhabits". The series's landscapes, figures, dream sequences, and open-ended nature of episodes have drawn comparisons to the works of David Lynch.

Writing for the academic journal Convergence, Jessica Balanzategui and César Albarrán-Torres describe Salad Fingers as "a significant stylistic and generic contribution to the early period of participatory digital cultures" and the character as a "patron saint of the digital uncanny". Balanzategui further identifies Salad Fingers as a major influence on mainstream media works, including the Channel 4 series Don't Hug Me I'm Scared and the 2022 horror films Skinamarink and Talk to Me, as well as the viral TikTok animated web series Skibidi Toilet. Firth credits the transition of Salad Fingers episodes from Newgrounds to YouTube, the latter of which offered "higher and higher-quality video formats", as contributing to the eventual deprecation of the Flash format, in which Salad Fingers episodes had been originally published.

In 2019, a Canadian high school teacher was temporarily suspended after showing his class a range of videos that students described as "weird, creepy and inappropriate" including Salad Fingers. The teacher ultimately resigned from his job at the school and attended a disciplinary program. In response, Firth commented on Twitter that viewings of Salad Fingers should be "mandatory" for children.

== See also ==
- Making Fiends
- Marble Hornets
