= National garden festival =

UK events of the 1980s–90s

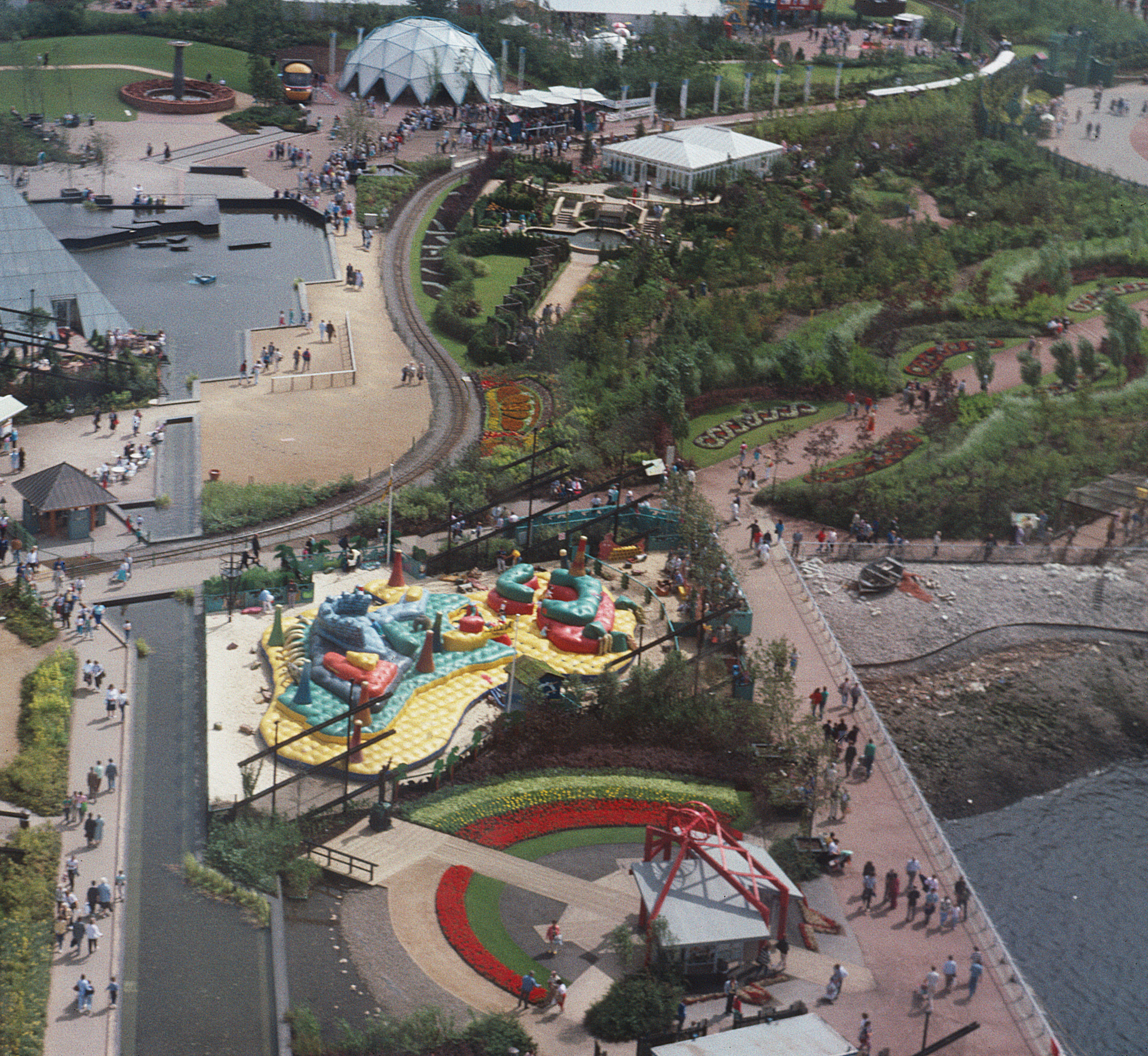
An overhead view of the 1988 Glasgow Garden Festival site.

The National Garden Festivals were events held in the UK during the 1980s and early 1990s to promote the cultural regeneration of large areas of derelict land in industrial districts. Five were held in total – one every two years, each in a different town or city – after the idea was pushed by the Conservative environment secretary Michael Heseltine in 1980.

National Garden Festivals were based on the German Bundesgartenschau concept, introduced post-war to reclaim large derelict industrial plots. The Festivals cost from £25 million to £70 million each, and the land they reclaimed included the contaminated former sites of steelworks and other heavy industry.

== Festivals ==
- Liverpool Garden Festival, 1984. Now a mix of housing, derelict sites (some intended for house building as of 2013), and a section of parkland renovated to restore public access in the early 2010s.
- Stoke-on-Trent Garden Festival, 1986. Now mostly maturing garden parkland, with some retail and offices.
- Glasgow Garden Festival, 1988. Now the Glasgow Science Centre, and a digital media village on the banks of the River Clyde.
- Gateshead Garden Festival, 1990. Now a housing estate.
- Ebbw Vale Garden Festival, 1992. Now a mix of housing, parkland, and a small business park.

== See also ==
- Urban regeneration
- Garden festival
