= Lambton College =

College in Sarnia, Ontario, Canada

Lambton College of Applied Arts and Technology
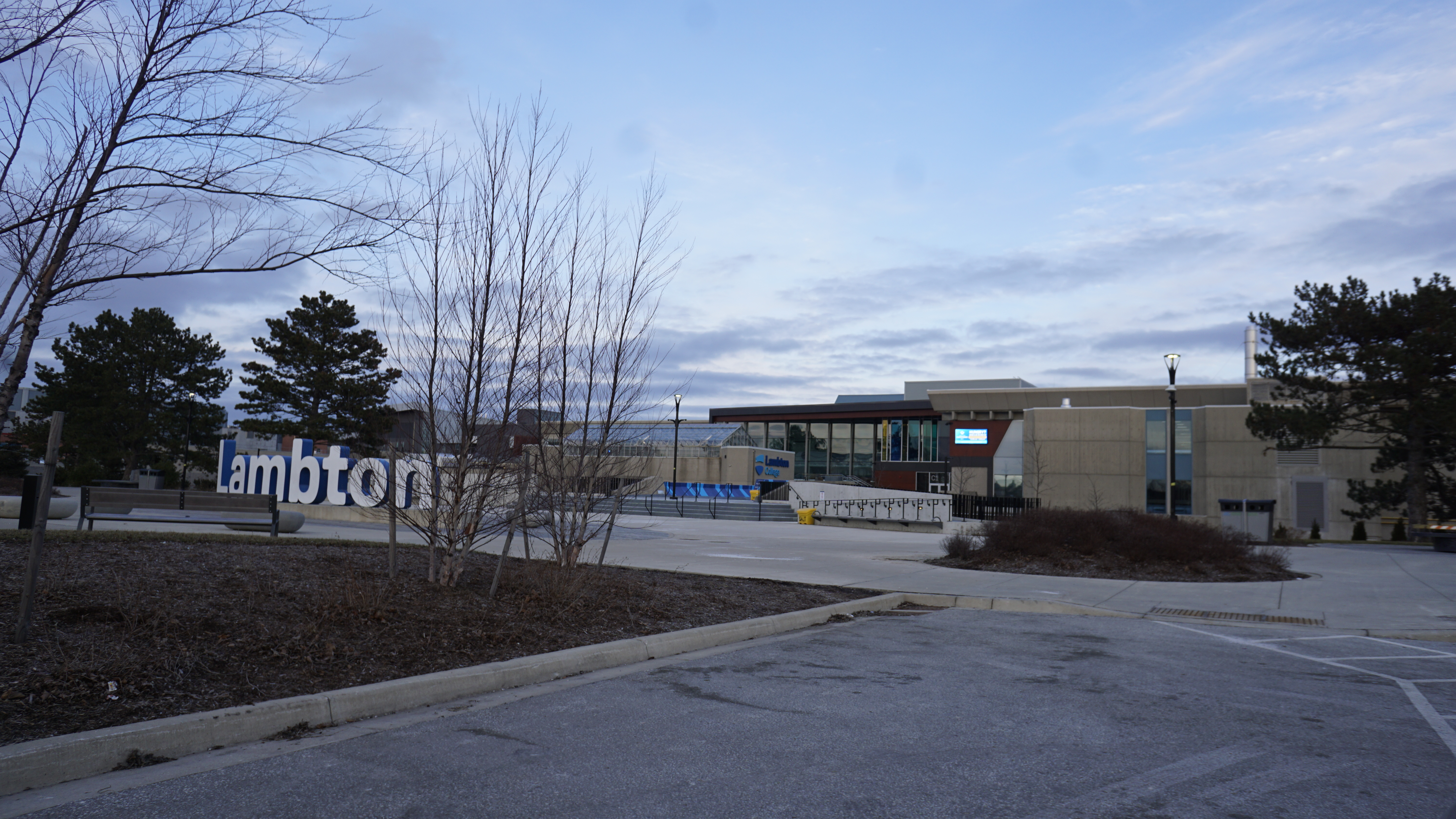
- Type: Public
- Established: 1969
- Affiliations: CCAA, ACCC, AUCC, CBIE
- Chair: Tania Lee
- President: Rob Kardas, president & CEO
- Students: Over 3,500 full-time, over 6,500 part-time, 500 international (on campus), over 3,500 international (off shore), 600 apprenticeship (2025: 2,182 FTEs)
- Location: 1457 London Road; Sarnia, Ontario; N7S 6K4; 42°58′49.89″N 82°20′54.91″W
- Campus: Urban
- Sports teams: Lambton Lions
- Colours: White and blue
- Mascot: Pounce
- Website: www.lambtoncollege.ca

Lambton College is a public college located in Sarnia, Ontario, Canada. Founded in 1966, the college offers programs across various fields, including business, community services, health sciences, fire and engineering technology.

The campus is located on the traditional territory of the Ojibwe, Potawatomi, and Odawa Nations. These three nations make up the traditional Three Fires Confederacy. Lambton College acknowledges the grace and welcome they have offered to all students, staff and guests.

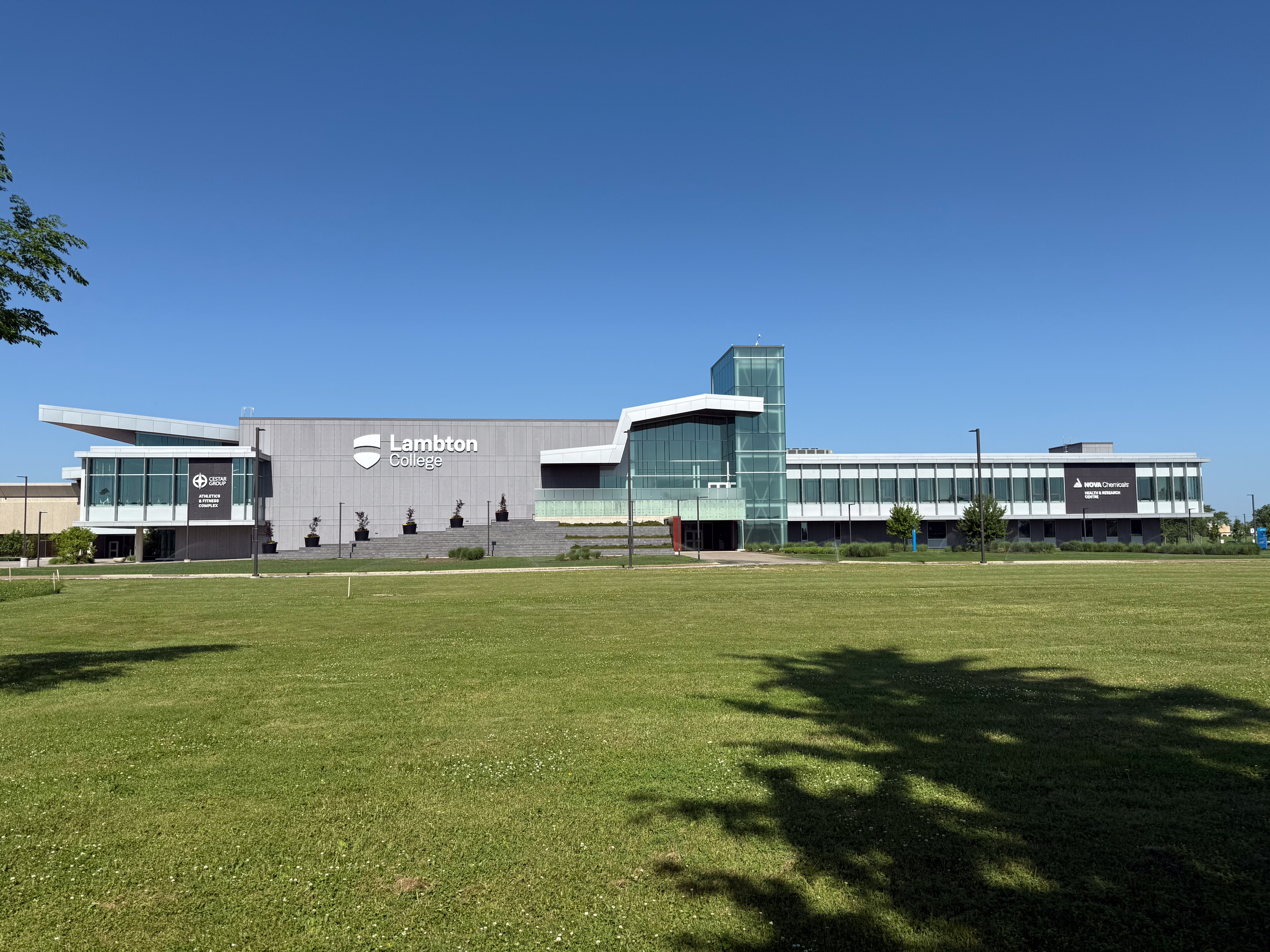
Athletics & Fitness Complex + NOVA Chemicals Health & Research Centre

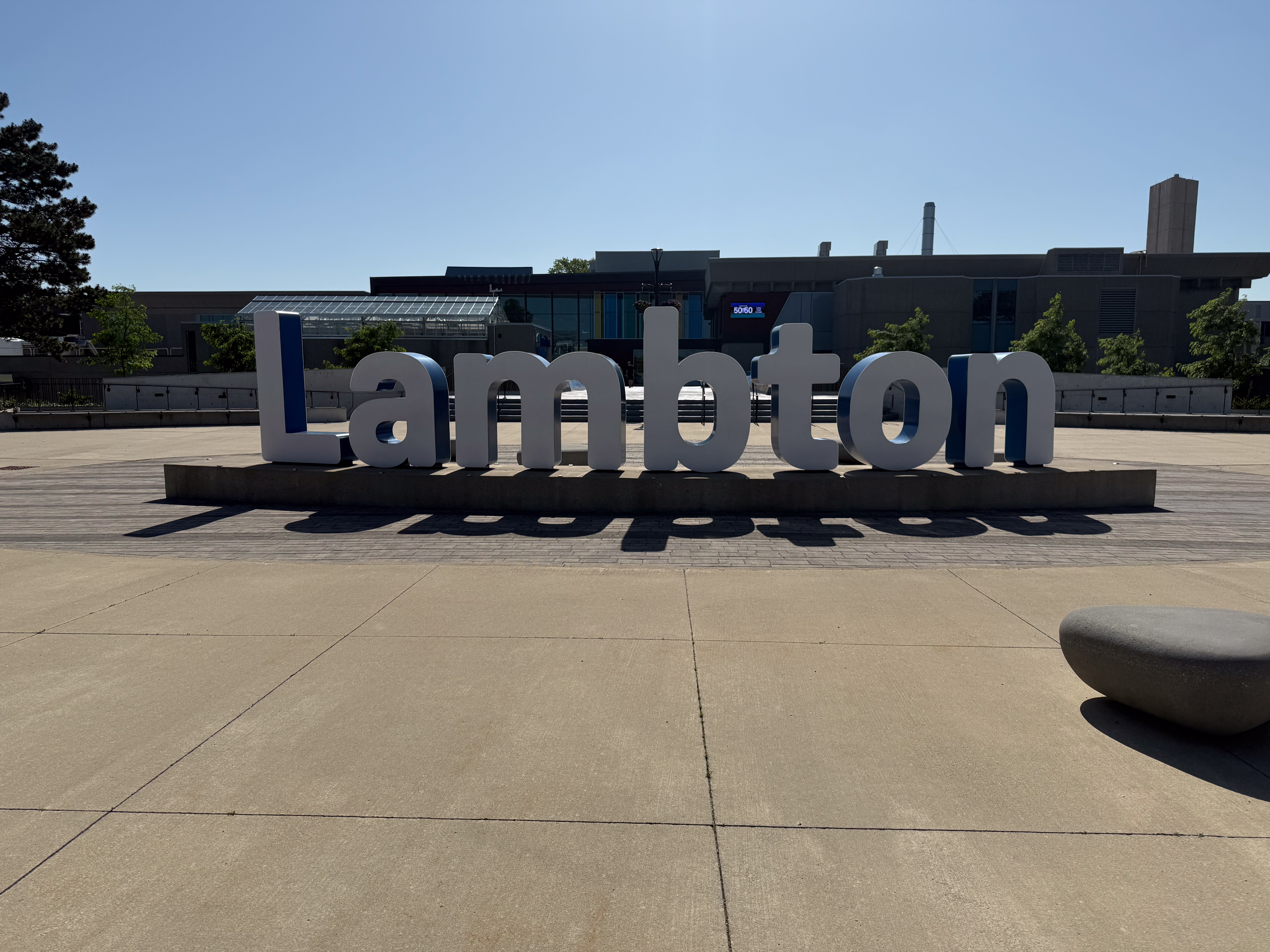
Letters, head on

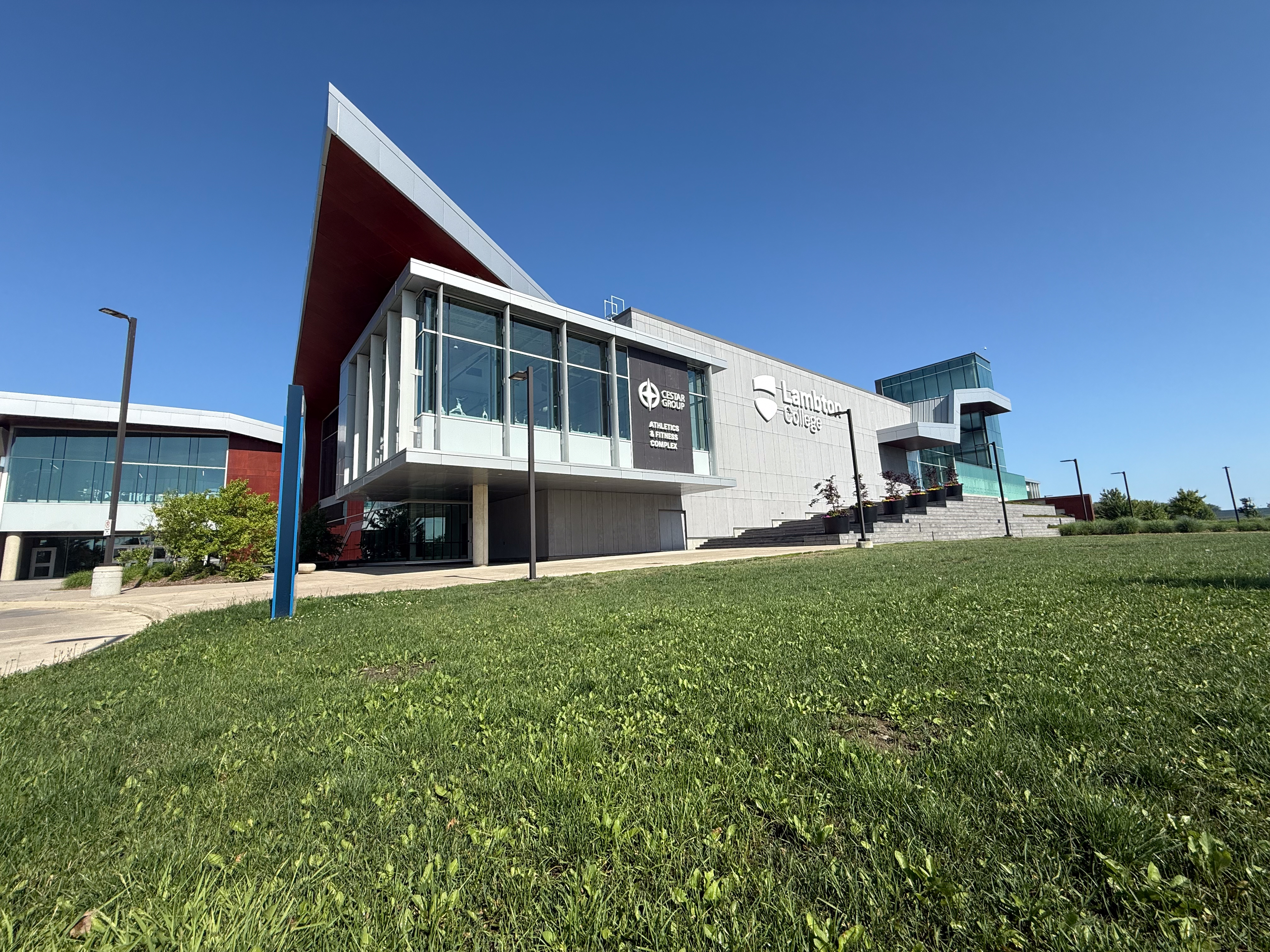
South entrance, closest to Wellington Road

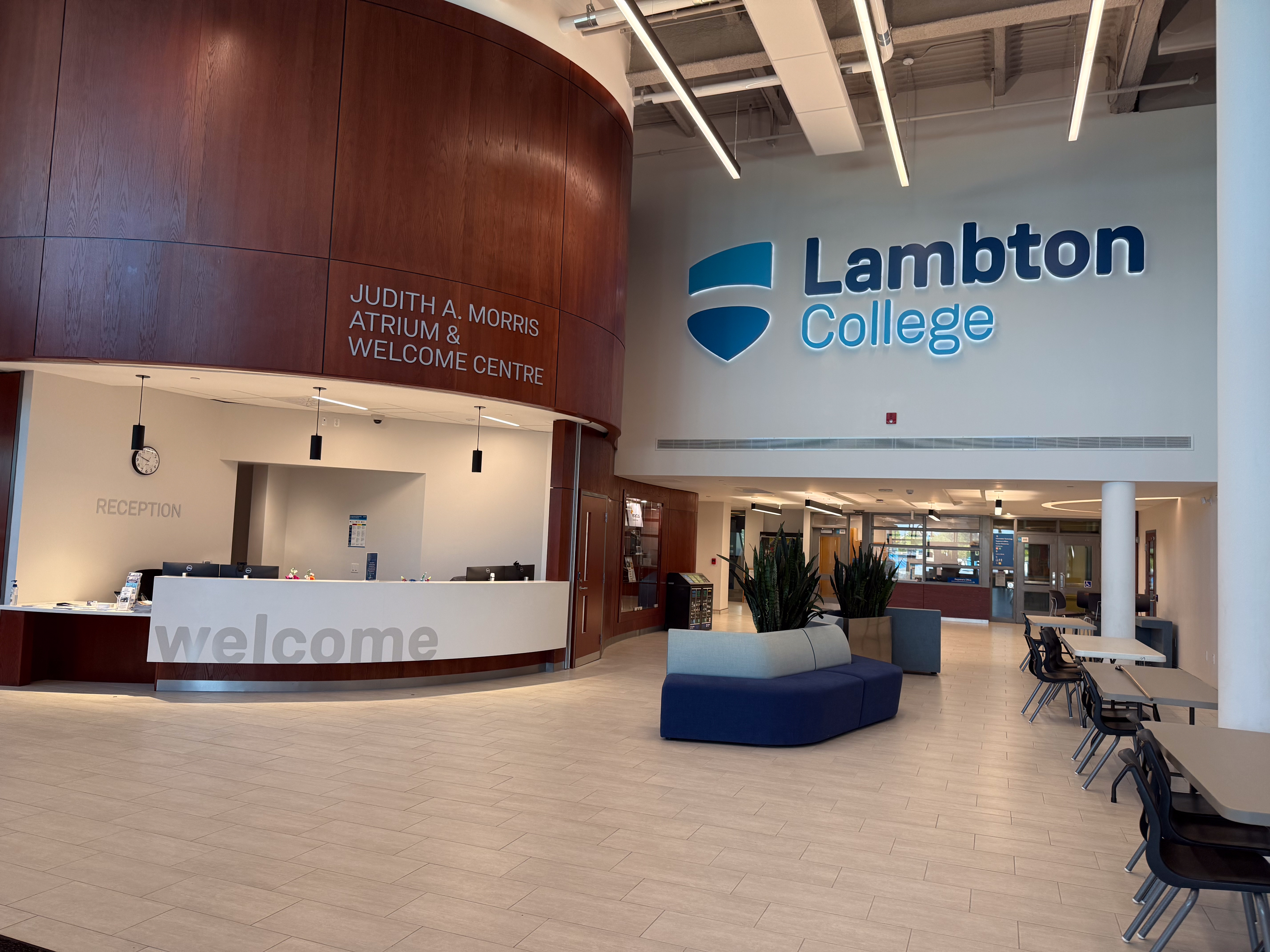
Letter at bridge entrance

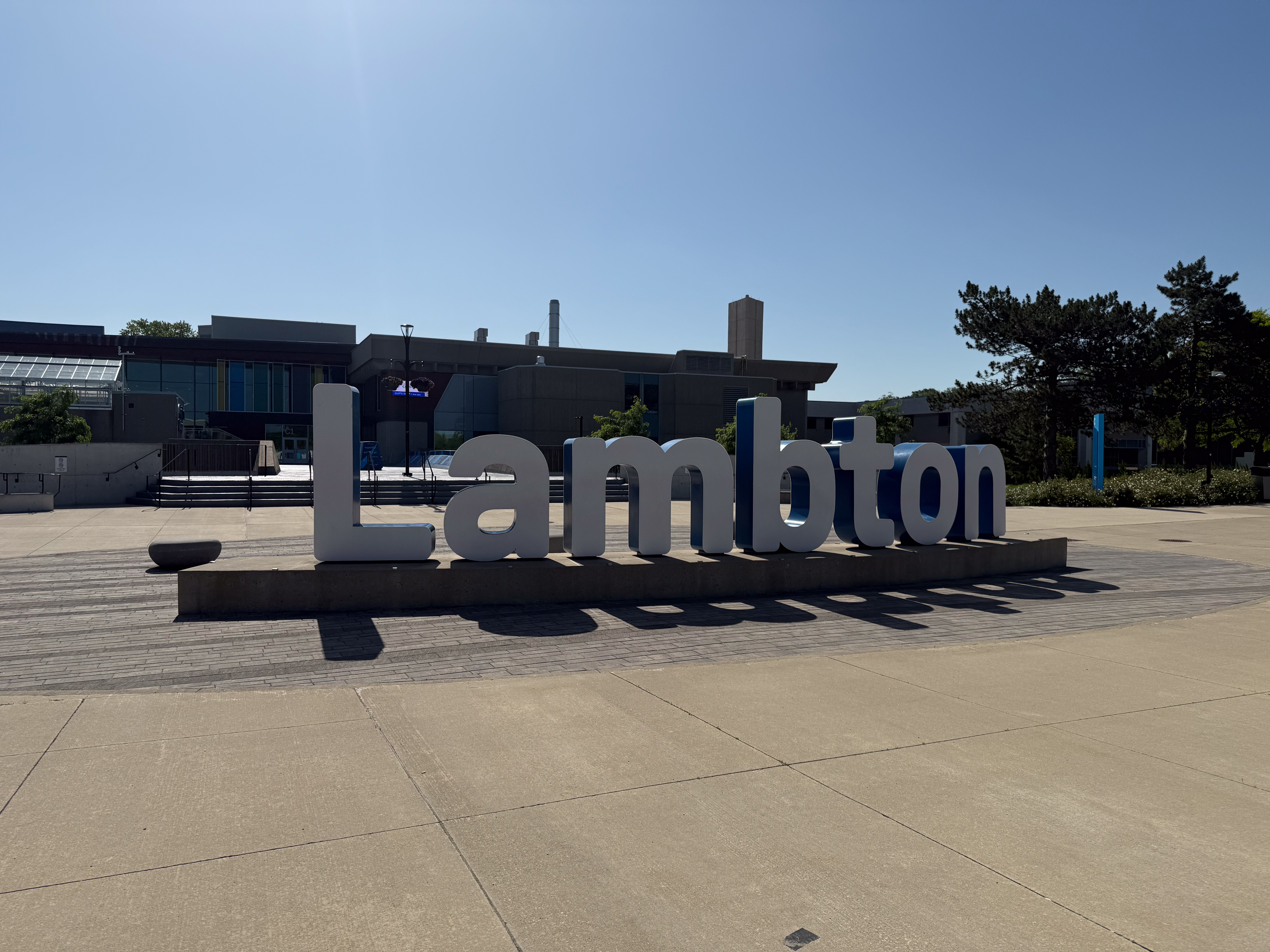
Letter at bridge entrance

== Programs ==
Lambton College has more than 70 post-secondary programs and apprenticeships, academic upgrading, post-graduate, part-time and training programs. The college also has pathways that lead to credentials.

Academic schools:

- School of Applied Science, Engineering Technology & Trades
- School of Business, Information Technology & Liberal Studies
- School of Health, Community Services & Fire Science
- School of Nursing
- Apprenticeship training
- Online education

== Buildings and facilities ==
After many decades with no new construction, Lambton College had a number of new additions and upgrades starting in the late 2010s.

The NOVA Chemicals Health & Research Centre was officially opened on May 15, 2019. The facility is home to all Health Sciences programming labs and advanced technology simulation facilities.

The Athletics & Fitness Complex opened on October 18, 2018 with a 15,000 sq. ft. facility and over 1,200 seats.

Centre of Excellence in Energy & Bio-Industrial Technologies was designed to bring together academic programming, industry-standard training, and research labs. The official opening took place in September 2018 after a two-year, $14.2 million upgrade of the 34,000 sq. ft. facility, which also included the addition of 7,000 sq. ft. of training space.

Capstones is an on-campus restaurant and applied learning environment for culinary programs.

Formerly known as the Fire & Public Safety Centre of Excellence, the campus was rebranded as the Lambton College Fire School in spring 2019. It is an $11-million facility featuring a two-story structure with classrooms, a triple-truck bay, a fire tower and training props.

The Skilled Trades Training Centre provides skilled trades and apprenticeship training with classrooms, labs and facilities.

The Sustainable Smart Home is a $1.2 million building, featuring a cutting-edge energy management system, used for applied research and learning.

The Salon & Spa at Lambton is a teaching facility and a full-service spa and salon run and managed by students in Lambton's Esthetician, Medical Esthetics & Advanced Skin Care Therapies and Hairstylist programs.

== Athletics ==
The Lambton Lions varsity sports teams play in the OCAA and CCAA conferences. There are currently nine varsity sports offered:

- Badminton
- Men's baseball
- Men's basketball
- Women's basketball
- Cross country
- Firefit
- Men's soccer
- Women's soccer
- Women's softball

== History ==
In 1966, Lambton was the second college in the Ontario college system to officially open. At this time 45 students were enrolled in five programs at the college. The main campus' utilized a brutalist architecture style and the cornerstone was dedicated on June 4, 1970 by then Ontario Minister of Education Bill Davis. The cornerstone contained a time capsule containing coins, bills, stamps, the college calendar for 1970–71, a copy of the school's charter, the school seal, a copy of the land deed for the college among other items. These items were removed during a cornerstone opening in celebration of the 50th anniversary in 2019 during campus renovations. The time capsule was then reviewed, and added to and then sealed, also as part of the 50th anniversary celebrations. The new capsule can be found inside the North entrance of the NOVA Chemicals Health & Research Centre.

The first president of Lambton College was Wolfgang Franke. He started full-time duties in January 1967 and his starting salary was $18,000. The first faculty tour of the original site was delayed because the building housing the classrooms was locked and no one had the key. Faculty member Ron Lawrence discovered (much to his dismay) that his house key fit the lock.

In 1975, a sculpture commissioned by the school, Homage, was constructed by artist Haydn Davies. The college removed the sculpture in 2005, which was the subject of a lawsuit settled in 2010.

== International ==
Lambton College has been welcoming international students for over 50 years, offering a diverse and inclusive environment. The college provides opportunities for international students to study at its campuses in Sarnia and Ottawa.

International students at Lambton College can benefit from a variety of support systems, including academic assistance, emotional support, and social activities. The college also offers programs that are eligible for the Post-Graduate Work Permit (PGWP), allowing students to gain valuable Canadian work experience through co-op placements and applied research opportunities.

== Scholarships and bursaries ==
Lambton College offers a variety of scholarships and bursaries.

These financial aids are provided by various donors and are awarded based on different criteria. Scholarships are typically granted for academic excellence or merit, while bursaries are given to students who demonstrate financial need.

In the 2021-22 academic year, Lambton College distributed over $1.5 million in bursary funding and $170,000 in scholarship funding. A total of 964 students received bursaries during this period.

== Notable alumni ==
- Judy Foote
- Piyush Bhatia, former student of Sambhram Institute of Technology

== See also ==
- Canadian government scientific research organizations
- Canadian industrial research and development organizations
- Canadian Interuniversity Sport
- Canadian university scientific research organizations
- Higher education in Ontario
- List of colleges in Ontario
