= Homage (sculpture) =

Sculpture by Haydn Davies

- Artist: Haydn Llewellyn Davies
- Year: 1974
- Owner: Lambton College

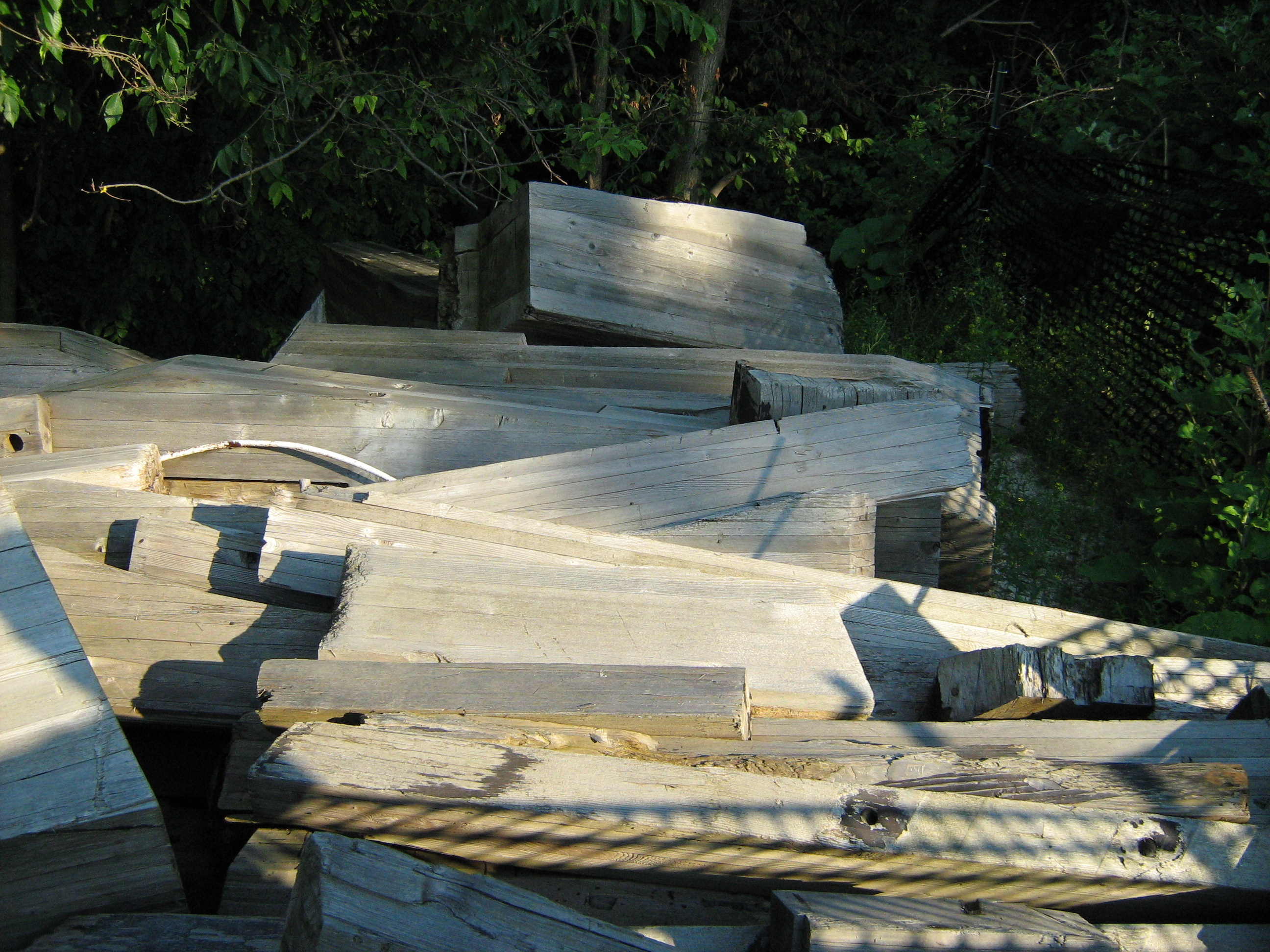
The remains of Homage in the field behind the school.

Homage was a sculpture by Haydn Davies, commissioned by Lambton College to stand outside the school's main entrance in Sarnia, Ontario, Canada. It was constructed in 1975 and destroyed by the college in 2005.

== History ==
In 1974, the college commissioned Davies to construct Homage, a wooden structure, outside the main entrance of the college. James Adams of The Globe and Mail called Homage, "one of Canada's most famous public sculptures".

=== Destruction ===
In June 2005, the college tore it down with a backhoe, citing safety concerns due to an ant infestation and other animals degrading the structure. Davies' son Bryan evaluated the damage as only superficial and contended the sculpture could have been repaired. In negotiations about compensation to Davies for the destruction, the Davies family proposal included an apology and commissioning of a new $60,000 sculpture by Davies. Lambton College was unwilling to fund a new piece and unlikely to apologize stating, "we believe Lambton was well within its moral and legal rights". The college president Tony Hanlon in an email to Bryan sought assurances that there would be no further public criticism of the college. Bryan Davies stated, "My father cannot, in good conscience, agree not to speak out". In 2006, Davies sued the college for $1.2 million, contending the college failed to maintain the structure. Davies died in 2008 and the lawsuit was settled in 2010, with the details not made public.

Bryan Davies made a video homage2Homage which called it an arbitrary decision to destroy the structure.

The story of the sculpture's destruction inspired a play, called Homage, by Anthony Black. The play was first produced in 2009 by 2b theatre company of Halifax, Nova Scotia.
