= Andrew Dutkewych =

Canadian contemporary artist

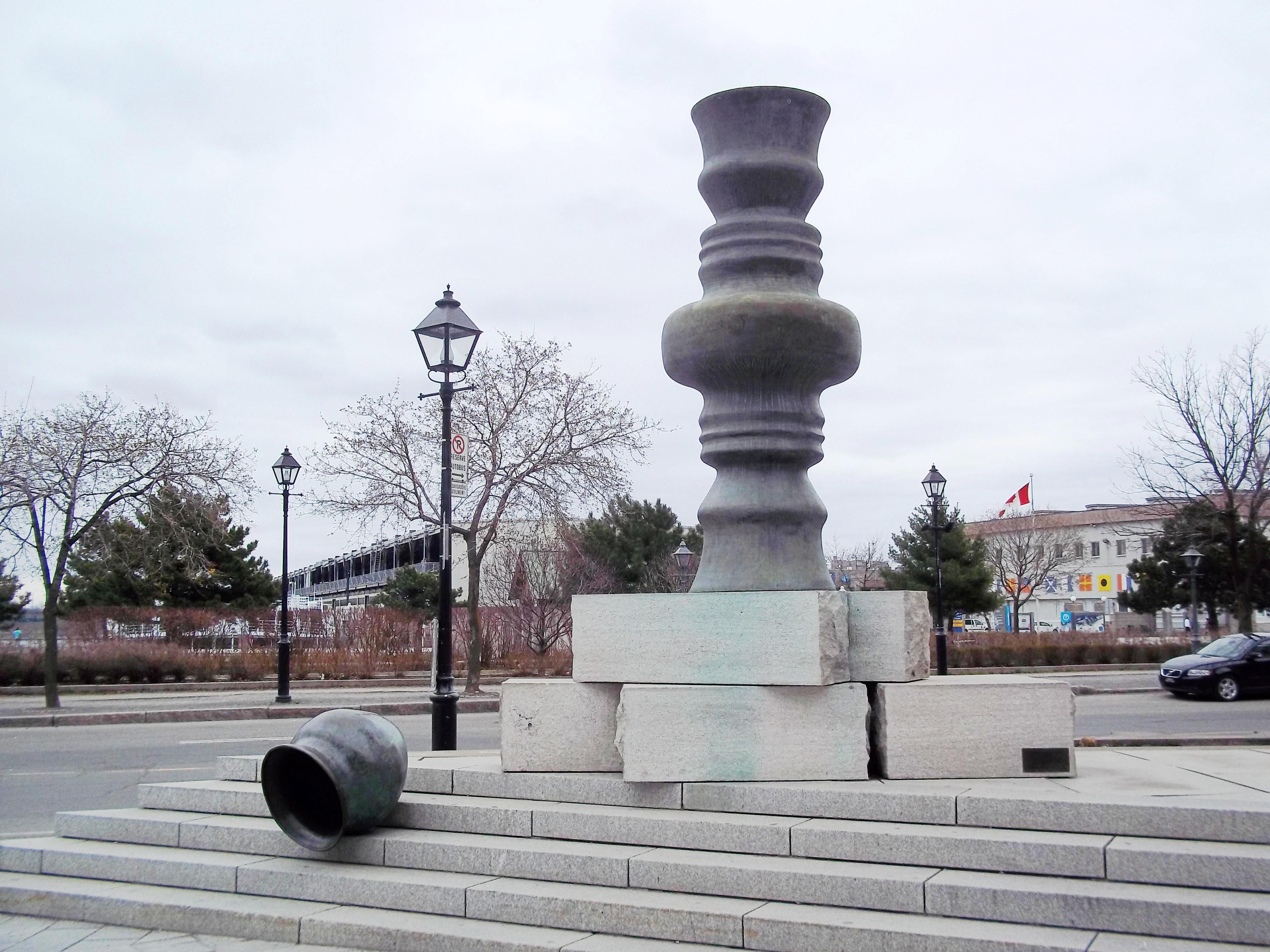
Dutkewych's Entre Nous, near the Pointe-à-Callière museum in Montreal

Andrew Dutkewych (born 1944, Vienna) is a Canadian contemporary artist known for his sculptural works.

== Life ==
Dutkewych was born in Vienna in 1944. In 1966 he received a Bachelor of Arts from Philadelphia College of Art (1966) as well as a degree from the Slade School of Fine Art in London. Dutkewych is a professor of sculpture at Concordia University in Montreal.

== Work ==
Dutkewych works mainly in the areas of drawing, sculpture and public art.

== Public art ==
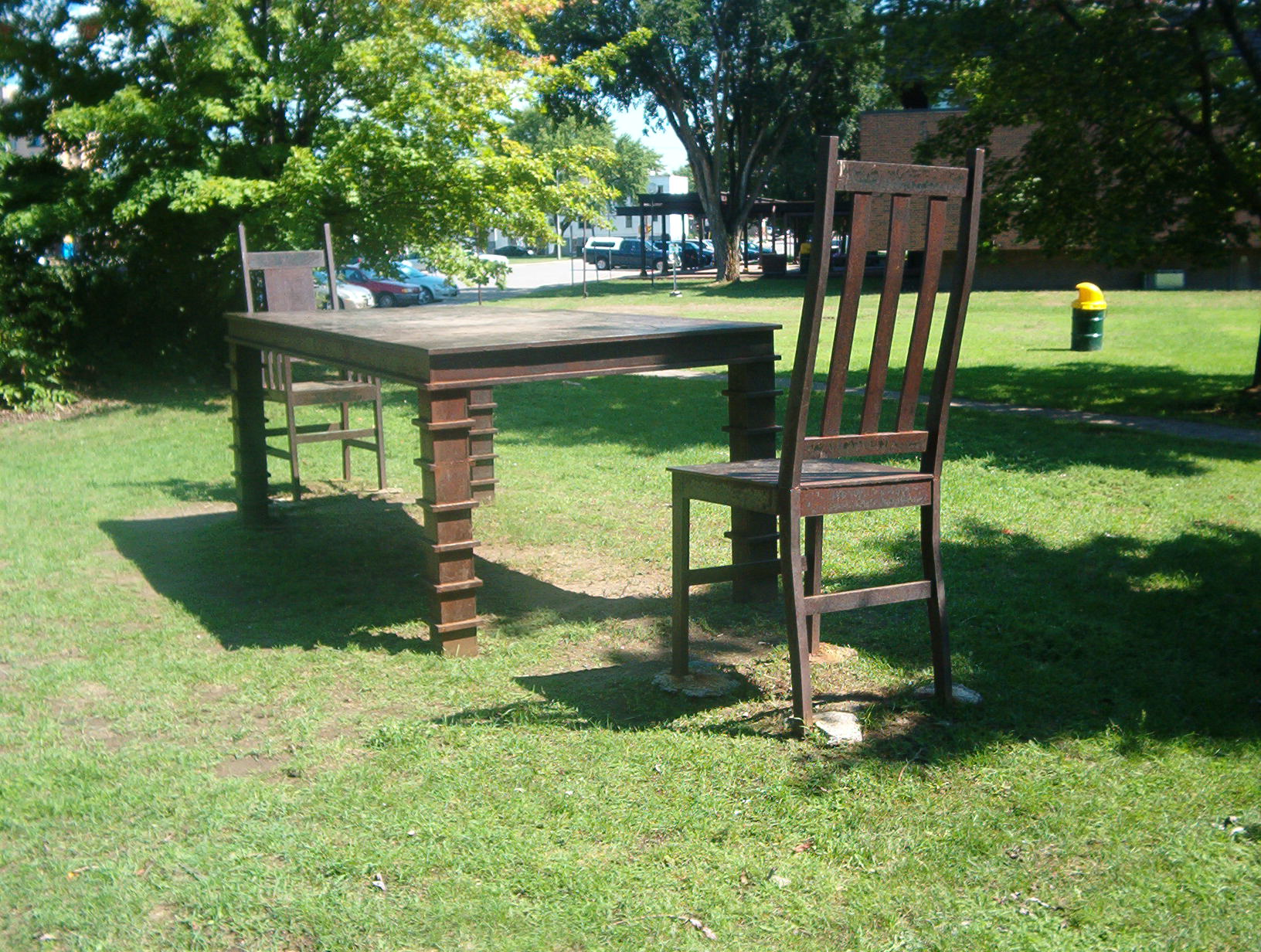
Andrew Dukewych's public sculpture Hole in the Sky, 1981 at the Art Gallery of Algoma, Sault Ste Marie.

Dutkewych's 1977 work Cascade III is in the collection of the Gananoque Sculpture Park. In 1981 he installed his work Hole In The Sky permanently in the sculpture garden of the Art Gallery of Algoma. His public fountain-sculpture Autour et de très près (1992) is installed on the campus of the Université du Québec à Montréal. He created the permanent public artwork Entre Nous in 1992 for the Pointe-à-Callière Museum in Montreal. The piece, created through Quebec's "1% for art" program, consists of a large and a small bronze casting integrated with a stone bench, situated at the convergence of two streets that enclose the museum.

== Collections ==
In addition to the permanent collections holding Dutkewych's works are also held in the permanent collections of the Musée national des beaux-arts du Québec and the Montreal Museum of Fine Arts. His works are also held in the permanent collections of the Art Gallery of Nova Scotia and the Leonard & Bina Ellen Art Gallery at Concordia University.

== Publications ==
- Dutkewych, Andrew; Sir George Williams Art Galleries (1982). Andrew Dutkewych: cascade series : September 15-October 2, 1982 : Sir George Williams Art Galleries, Concordia University. Montréal: Galleries = Les Galleries. ISBN 978-2-920394-02-5.
- Sir George Williams Art Galleries; Sir George Williams Art Galleries (1982). Andrew Dutkewych - cascade series. Montreal: The Galleries.
- Dutkewych, Andrew; Art Gallery of Hamilton (1989). Andrew Dutkewych. Hamilton, Ont.: Art Gallery of Hamilton. ISBN 978-0-919153-06-6.
- Dutkewych, Andrew; Stebbins, Joan; St-Pierre, Gaston; Southern Alberta Art Gallery (1989). Andrew Dutkewych. Lethbridge: Southern Alberta Art Gallery. ISBN 978-0-921613-10-7.
- Gould, Trevor (1989). Andrew Dutkewych. Art Gallery of Hamilton.
- Dutkewych, Andrew; St-Pierre, Gaston; Expression, Centre d'exposition de St-Hyacinthe (1996). Andrew Dutkewych: le vertige de l'équilibriste. Saint-Hyacinthe, Québec: Expression. ISBN 978-2-9802607-8-0.
- Fortin, Jocelyne; Dyck, Aganetha; Dutkewych, Andrew; Musée régional de Rimouski (2002). Traversée des sens, métamophose des apparences: Aganetha Dyck et Andrew Dutkewych. Rimouski: Musée régional de Rimouski. ISBN 978-2-920367-66-1.
