= Art Gallery of Algoma =

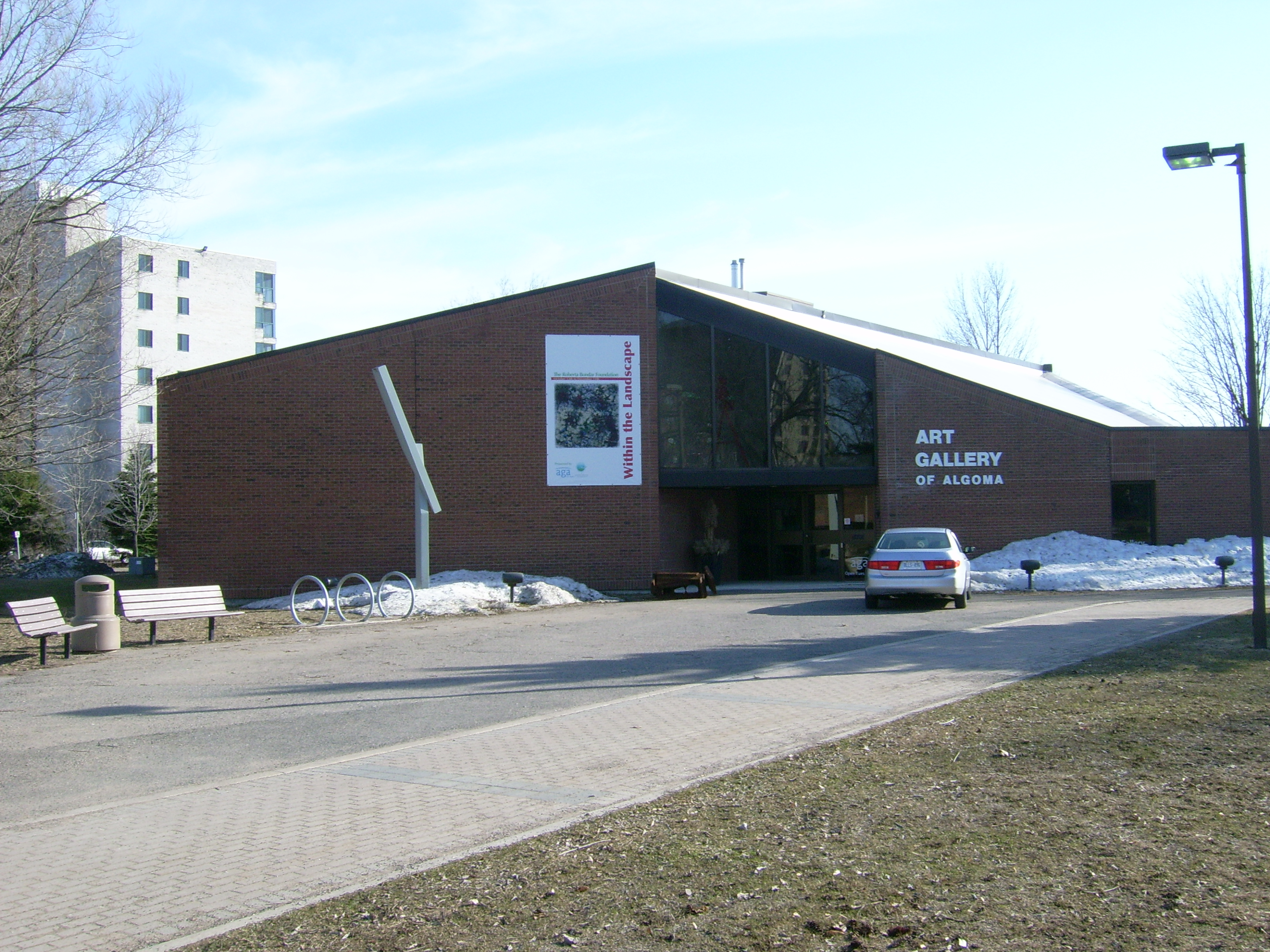
- Established: 7 July 1975; 50 years ago
- Location: 10 East Street, Sault Ste. Marie, Ontario, Canada
- Coordinates: 46°30′26″N 84°19′52″W
- Type: Art museum
- President: Mark A. Lepore
- Curator: Jasmina Jovanovic
- Website: www.artgalleryofalgoma.ca

The Art Gallery of Algoma (AGA) is an art museum in Sault Ste. Marie, Ontario, Canada. The museum occupies a 930 square metres (10,000 sq ft) facility, situated near the shoreline of St. Marys River.

The museum was formally incorporated on 7 July 1975, and in 1980, moved to its present location near the St. Marys River. The Art Gallery of Algoma serves as the principal art museum for the Algoma District, and maintains a permanent collection of approximately 5,000 works from regional artists, and other Canadian artists.

== History ==
In 1974, the arts community of Sault Ste. Marie formed an association with the aim to establish a permanent art museum in the city. The association was later formally incorporated as the Art Gallery of Algoma on 7 July 1975. From the association's founding, to June 1976, the institution held exhibitions at the city's Civic Centre, or the Old Stone House.

On 30 June 1976, the museum formally opened its permanent building, enabling the museum to organize classes, exhibitions, and seminars. However, in 1978 the Sault Ste. Marie City Council opted to move the museum to Clergue Park. Construction for the new building began in September 1979, with the building opening in September 1980.

== Architecture ==
The museum property is situated on the north shore of the St. Marys River, east of the Sault Ste. Marie Canal. The property comprises the museum's main building, and a sculpture garden. The 930 square metres (10,000 sq ft) main building was designed by local architect, R. V. B. Burgoyne. The building exterior features diagonal roof lines, and a large two-storey window at its lobby. Burgoyne stated his design was intended to be "people centred". Since its opening in 1980, the building has undergone several renovations, including its gift shop.

== Selected works ==
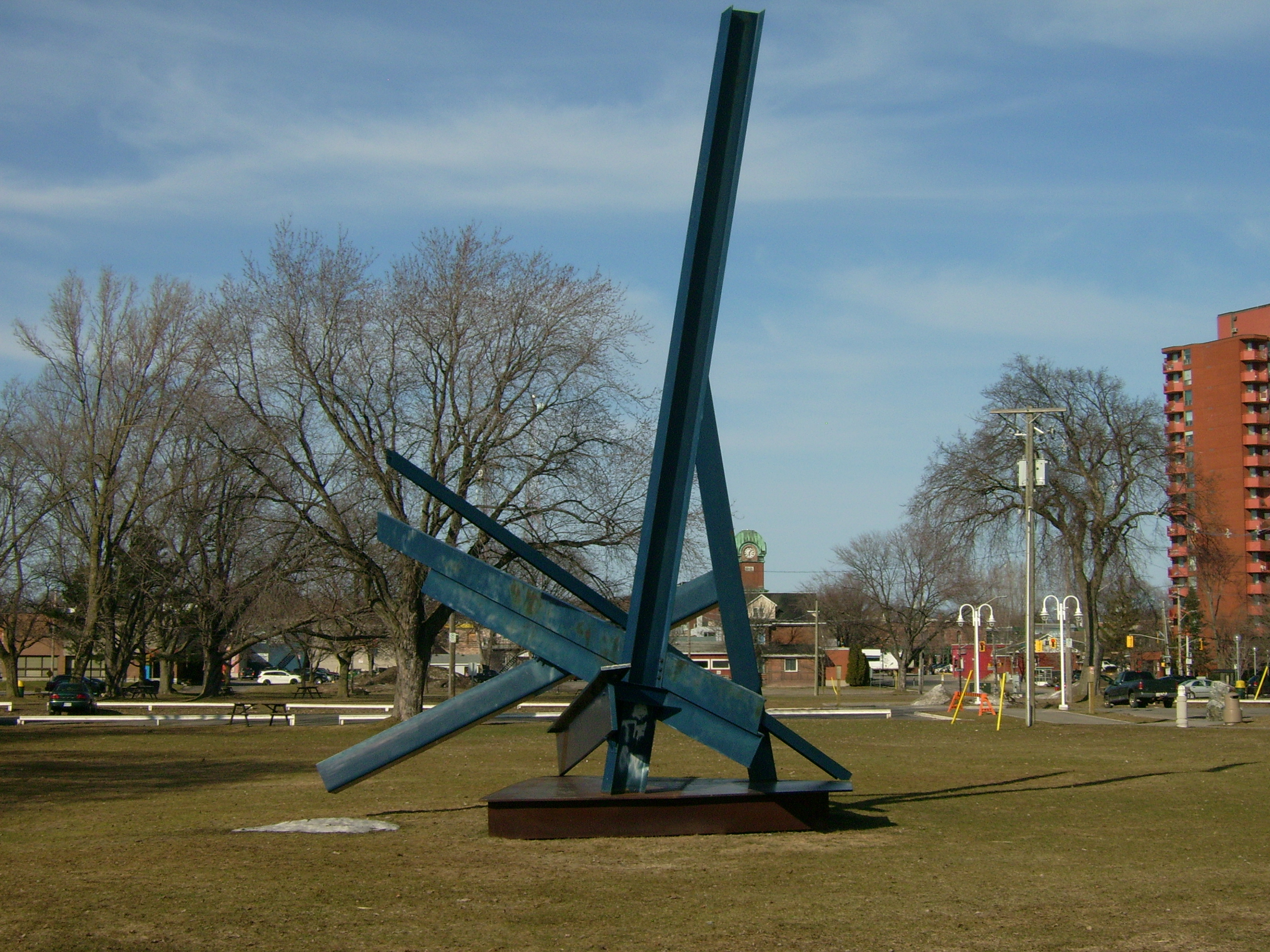
Algoma Blue by Haydn Llewellyn Davies

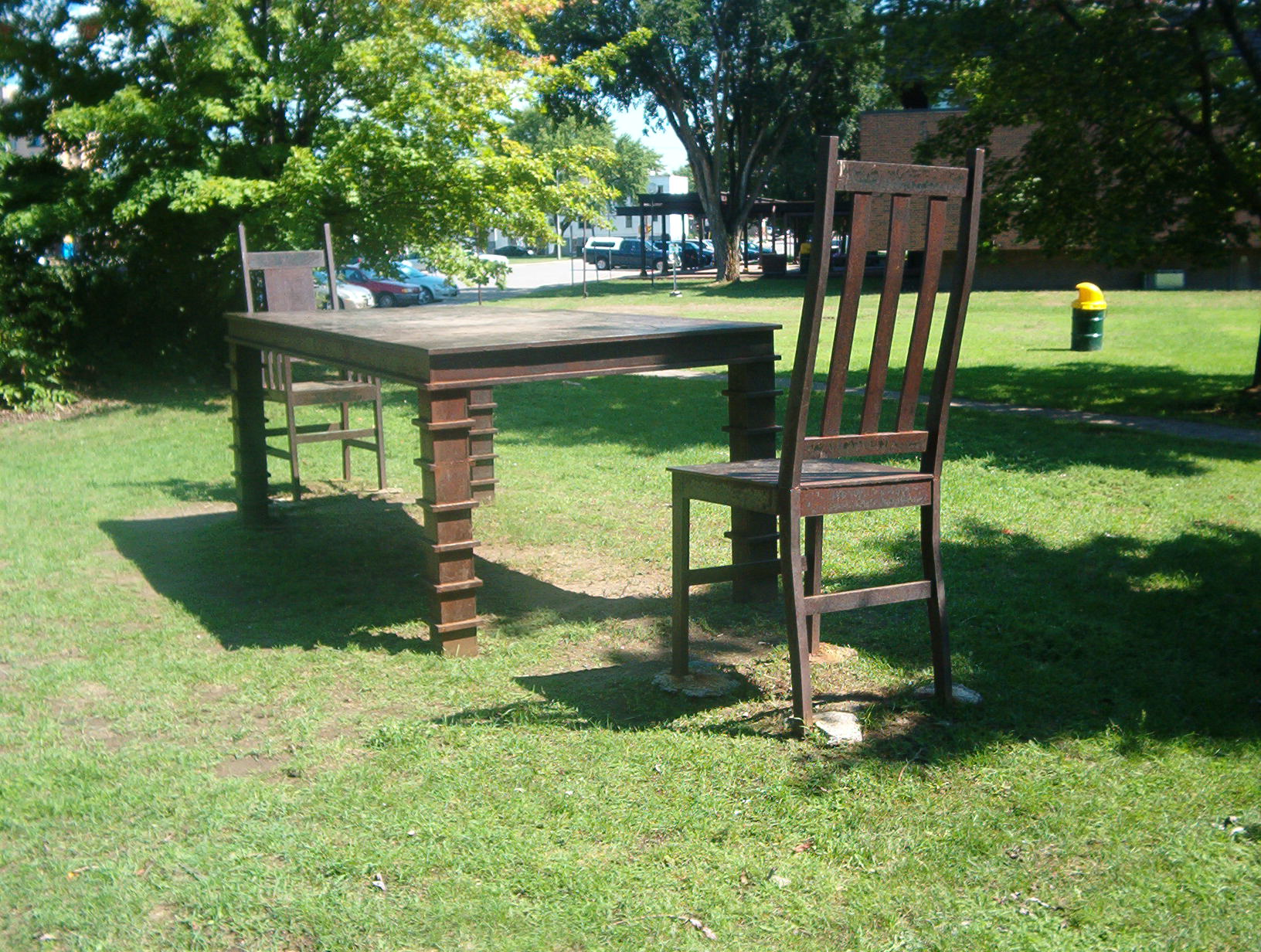
Hole in the Sky, 1987, by Andrew Dutkewych

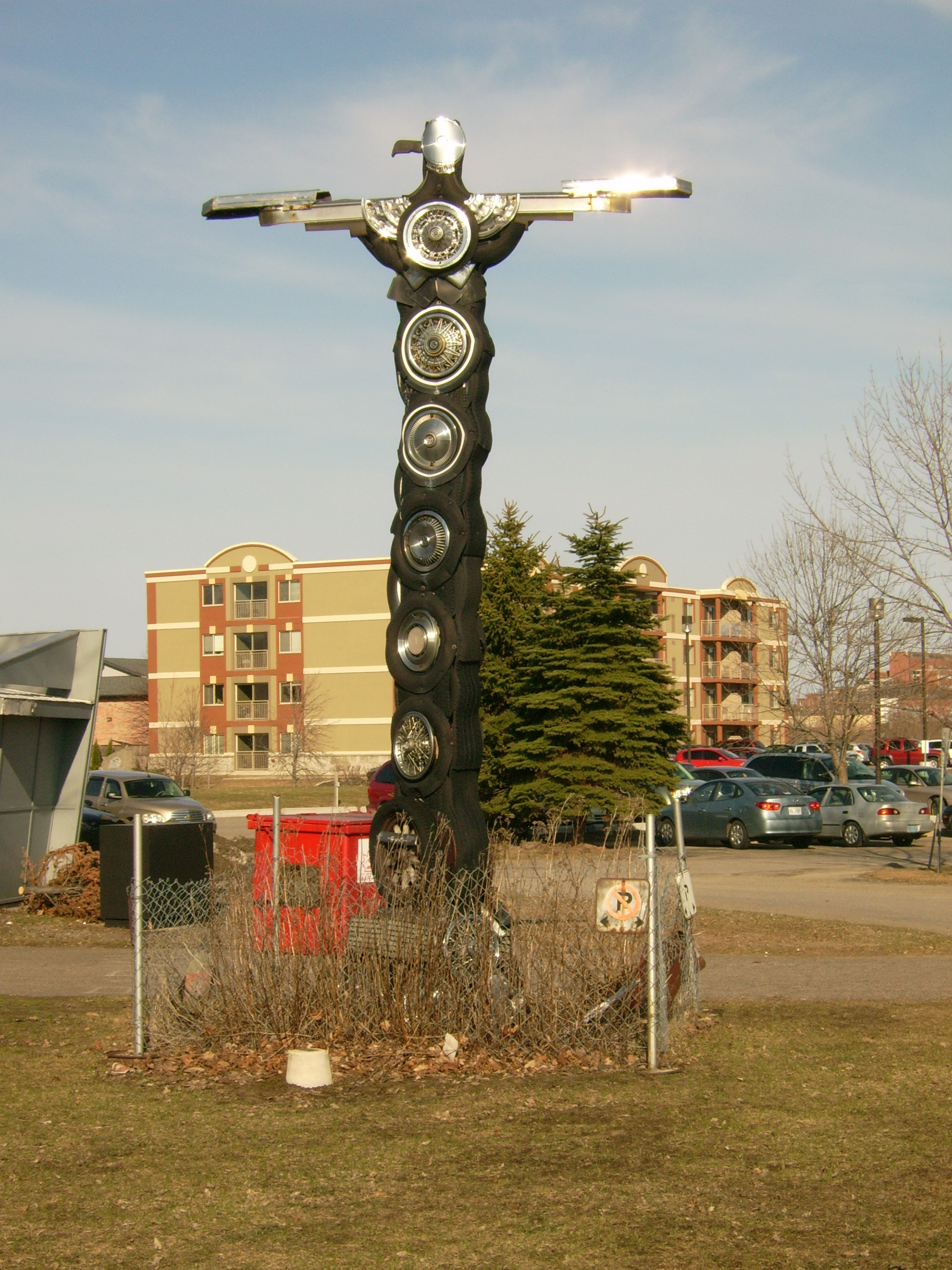
Dis Car Dead Parts #2 by William Morin

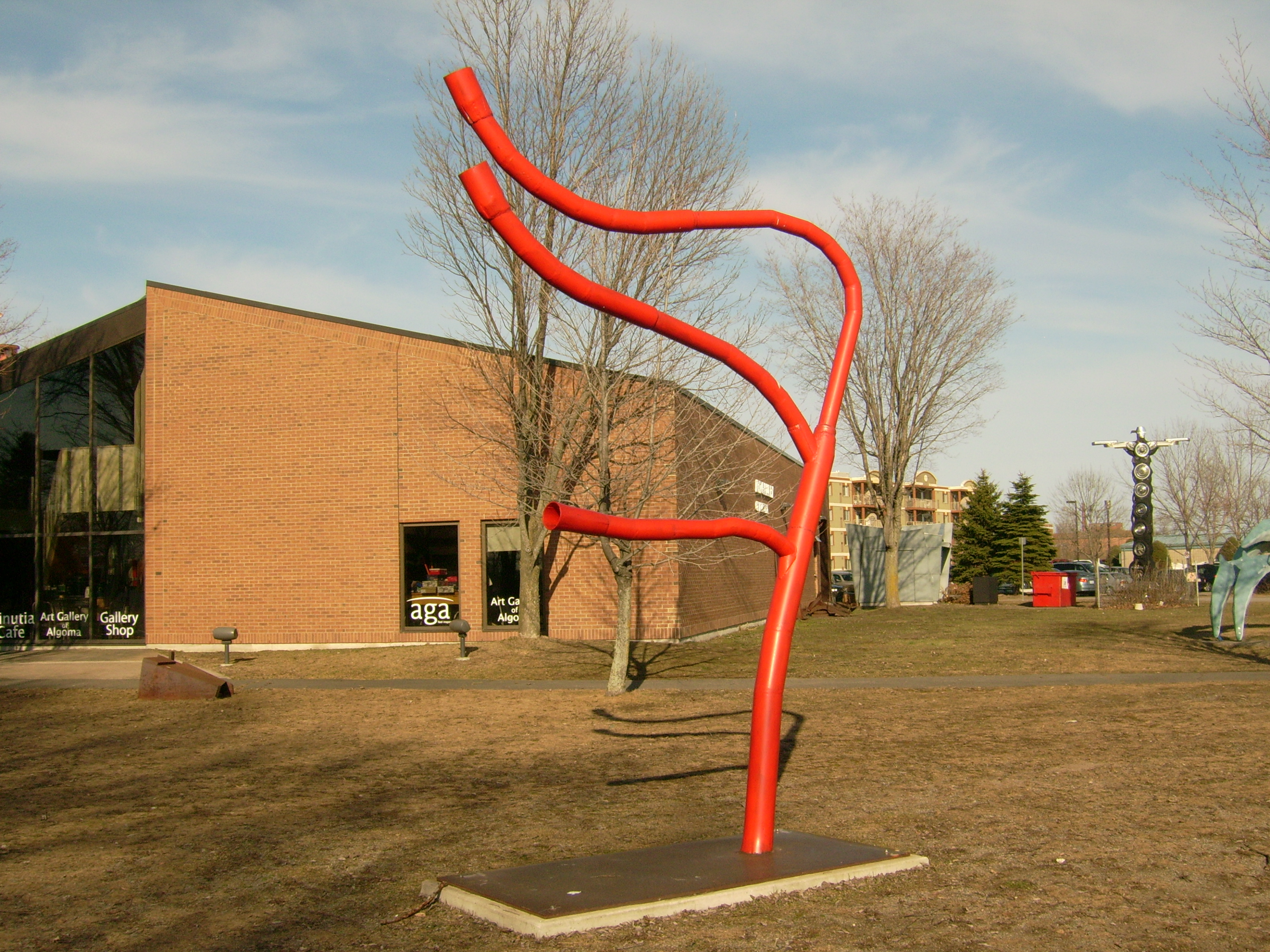
Three Winds by Pat Gladu

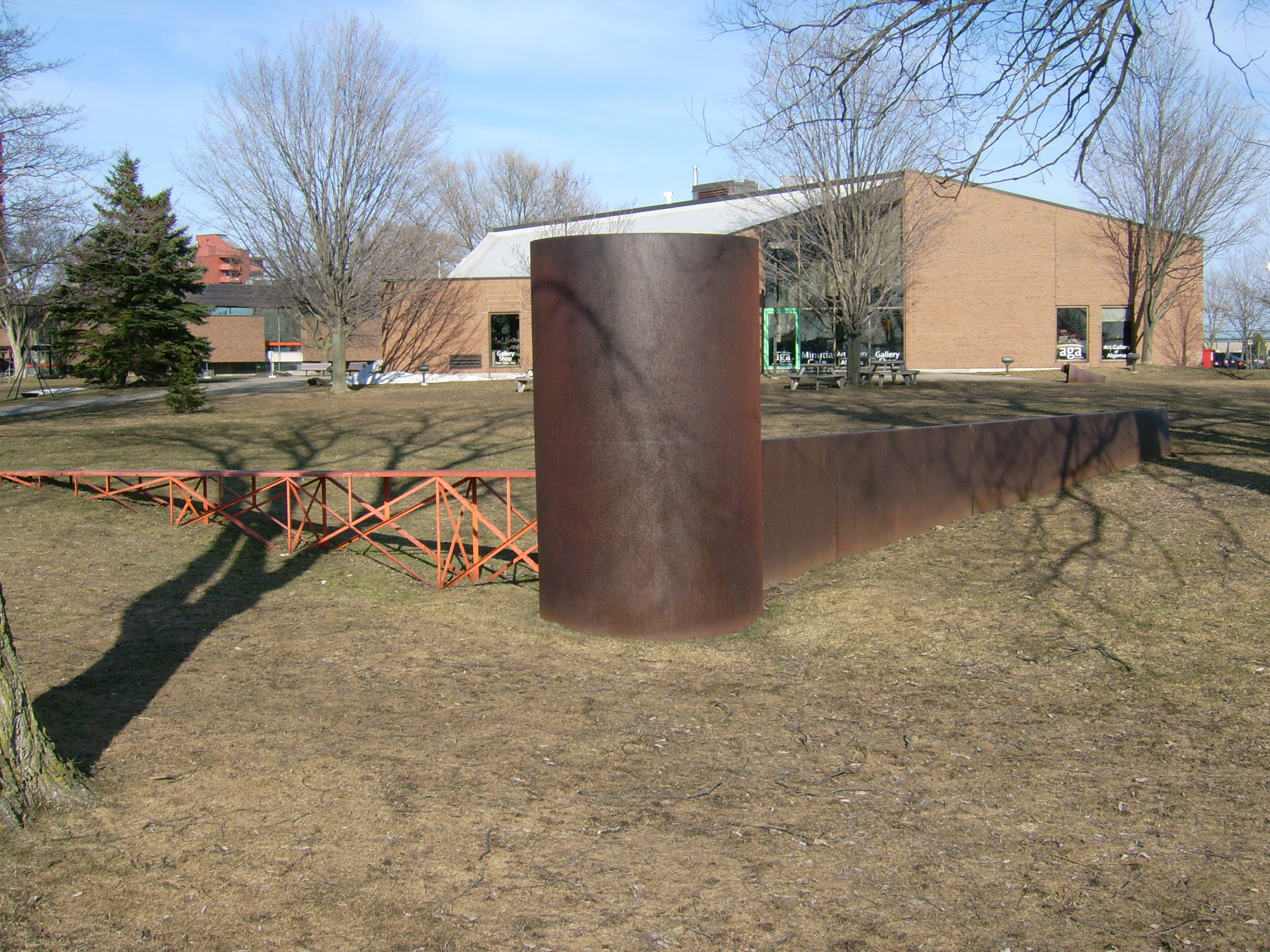
Pivotal Divide by Murray MacDonald

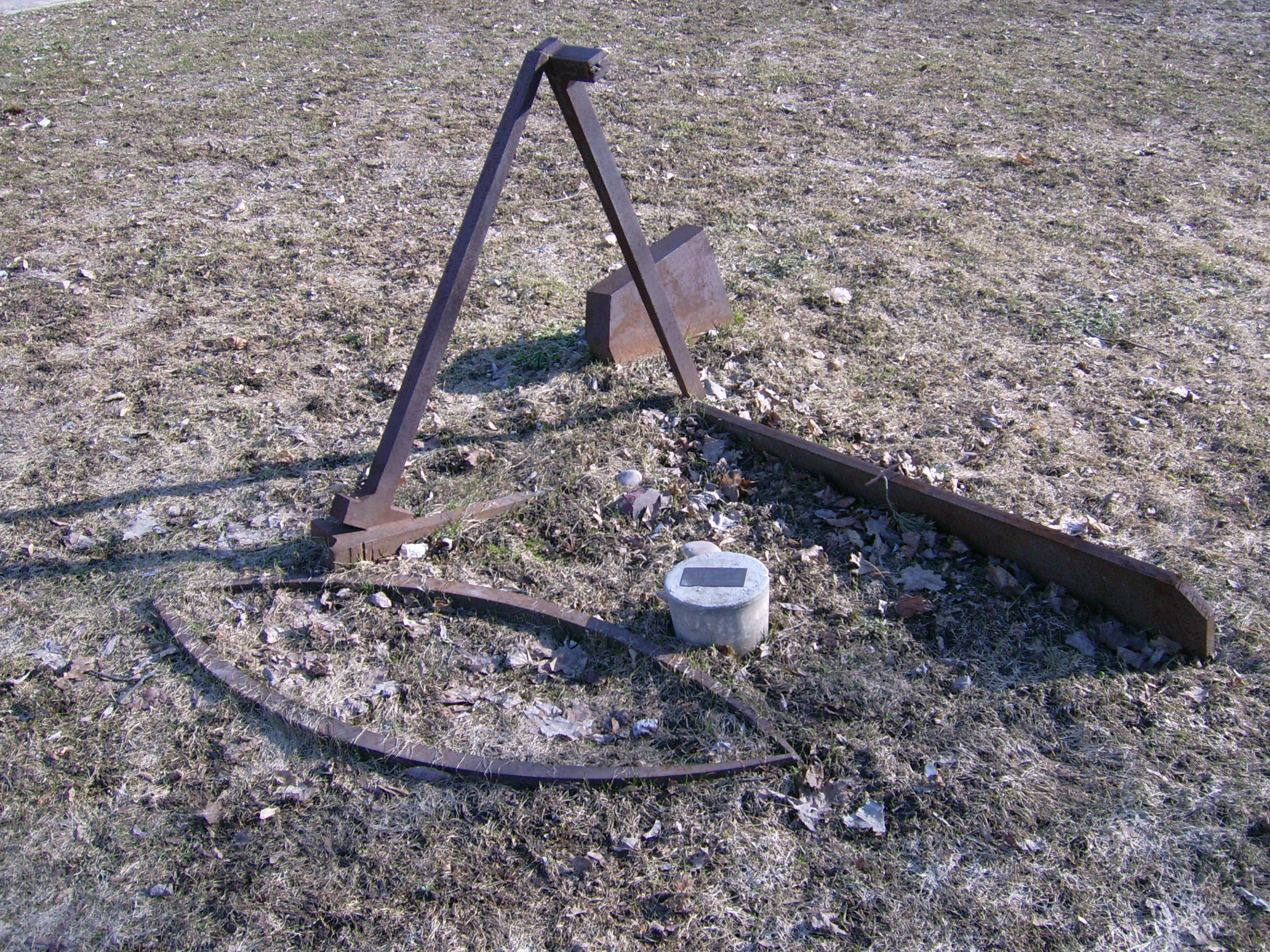
Untitled by André Fauteux

== See also ==
- List of art museums
- List of museums in Ontario
