= Haydn Llewellyn Davies =

Canadian artist (1921–2008)

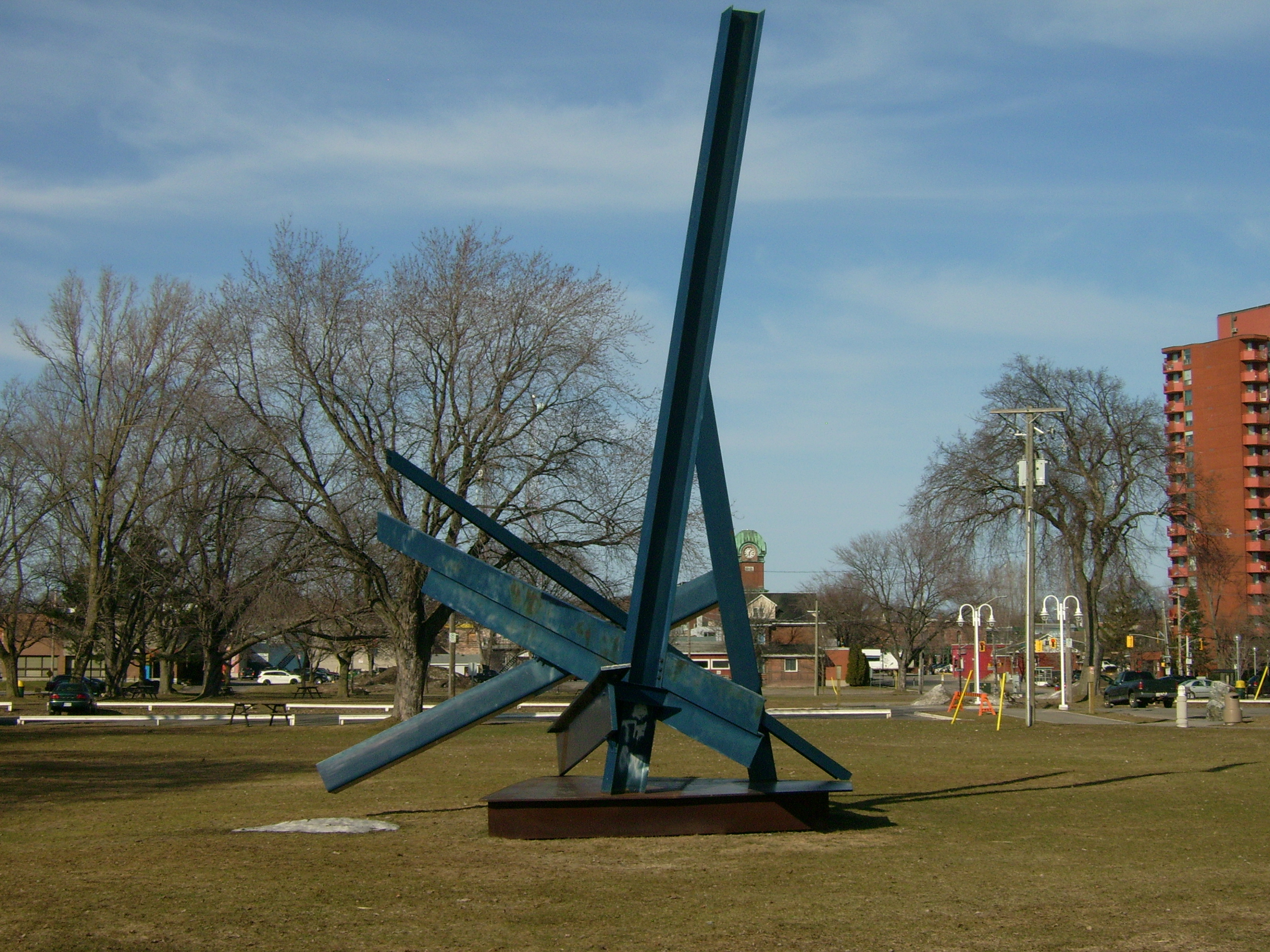
- Algoma Blue, Art Gallery of Algoma sculpture park
- Born: November 11, 1921; Rhymney, Wales
- Died: March 24, 2008 (aged 86); Toronto, Canada

Haydn Llewellyn Davies RCA (11 November 1921 – 24 March 2008) was a Welsh-born Canadian artist known for his large constructivist sculptures which stand outside many public buildings across Canada.

Davies was born on 11 November 1921 in Rhymney, Wales, his father was called Emrys and his mother was called Rosina, her maiden name being Gallop. The Davies family emigrated to Canada when he was around nine years old. He studied art at the Central Technical School from where he graduated in 1939. In the Second World War he joined the Royal Canadian Air Force and served overseas from 1941 -1945 with Bomber Command, attaining the rank of sergeant and being mentioned in despatches. While serving in the RCAF Davies designed a poster which is in the collection of the Victoria and Albert Museum in London.

After he finished his war service he completed his education at The Ontario College of Art, graduating in 1947. After graduating, Davies commenced work in graphic design and advertising, eventually rising to become a senior vice-president and director of McCann-Erickson Advertising of Canada, from where he resigned in 1976 when he was 55 to start work as a full-time sculptor. Me married Eva Koller in 1948 and the couple had two sons.

His work has been exhibited in a galleries including the Anita Shapolsky Gallery in New York City. In 2004 the Canadian government designated his sculpture Algoma Blue, located outside the Art Gallery of Algoma in Sault Ste. Marie, a heritage piece.

Davies was a member of the Royal Canadian Academy of Arts.
