= Building Digital UK =

Building Digital UK (BDUK)
Executive agency overview
- Jurisdiction: United Kingdom
- Minister responsible: Rt Hon Jonathan Reynolds, MP, Secretary of State for Business and Trade
- Deputy Minister responsible: Liz Lloyd, Parliamentary Under-Secretary of State for Digital Economy
- Executive agency executive: Lesley Cowley, Chair
- Parent department: Department for Science, Innovation and Technology
- Website: https://www.gov.uk/government/organisations/building-digital-uk

Building Digital UK (BDUK) is a unit within the Department for Science, Innovation and Technology (DSIT) responsible for rolling out broadband and mobile coverage to hard-to-reach (often rural) places across the United Kingdom. It was originally established as a directorate in the Department for Culture, Media and Sport in 2010 but later established as an executive agency in April 2022. It's parent department was changed to DSIT in February 2023 during a cabinet reshuffle by Rishi Sunak, however it was integrated into DSIT on 1 November 2025.

BDUK work to improve broadband and mobile connectivity in partnership with private companies, with the government subsidising private companies capital costs, so they can provide services such as broadband in areas that would otherwise be commercially unviable. The networks remain owned and operated by private companies, with BDUK responsible for certain governance and compliance. BDUK works to deliver two programmes, Project Gigabit (Broadband) and the Shared Rural Network (4G).

== Project Gigabit ==
BDUK is responsible for delivering 'Project Gigabit', the government's programme to enable hard-to-reach communities to access gigabit-capable broadband, focusing on homes and businesses that are not included in broadband suppliers’ plans. The government has committed to achieving nationwide gigabit coverage and aims for 99% of premises to have access to a gigabit-capable connection by 2032.

In 2019 only 6% of businesses and homes could access gigabit-capable broadband, this had increased to 78.5% by 2024 and to 87% by March 2025. The 2024-2025 annual progress report stated that factors which could impact the projects aims, included "supplier challenges, funding constraints, market conditions or deployment complexities".

== Shared Rural Network ==
This programme aims to deliver 4G to rural areas with limited or no 4G coverage, in partnership with mobile network operators, via a shared network of phone masts, across the UK. The most significant improvements are being delivered in Scotland, Wales and Northern Ireland. The £1 billion programme was funded by Three, EE, O2 and Vodafone, and the government.

In 2025 the government announced that the programme had delivered a significant objective earlier than expected, with 4G available in 95% of the UK (by landmass). Earlier in the year, the programme had been scaled back, reducing the number of planned new masts to 60. By July 2025, 56 masts were live across the UK, including 30 in Wales. By March 2026, the number of live masts in the UK had increased to 119, including 50 in Wales.
