= Blaenau Gwent (UK Parliament constituency) =

UK Parliament constituency (1983–2024)

Coordinates: 51.777°N 3.195°W

- Former county constituency for the House of Commons
- Boundary of Blaenau Gwent in Wales
- Preserved county: Gwent
- Population: 69,814 (2011 census)
- Electorate: 53,791 (December 2010)
- Major settlements: Ebbw Vale, Abertillery, Brynmawr, Tredegar

1983–2024
- Seats: One
- Created from: Abertillery, Brecon and Radnor and Ebbw Vale
- Replaced by: Blaenau Gwent and Rhymney
- Senedd: Blaenau Gwent, South Wales East

Blaenau Gwent was a constituency in South Wales, that was represented in the House of Commons of the UK Parliament from 2010 to 2024 by Nick Smith of the Labour Party.

The constituency was abolished as part of the 2023 review of Westminster constituencies and under the June 2023 final recommendations of the Boundary Commission for Wales. The entire constituency became part of Blaenau Gwent and Rhymney.

== Constituency profile ==
Blaenau Gwent is a post-industrial area which formerly had significant coal and steel sectors.

== History ==
=== Predecessor seats ===
Blaenau Gwent incorporates most of the area of Aneurin Bevan's old constituency and other areas as population expansion has been low or negative following the 1960s. The constituency was created in 1983, twenty-three years after Bevan's death, from the upper part of the former Abertillery constituency, the town of Brynmawr from Brecon and Radnor, and Bevan's old Ebbw Vale seat with the exception of the area of the Rhymney Community (formerly Rhymney Urban District). The then-Labour party leader Michael Foot, who had won Ebbw Vale in the by-election following Bevan's death, was the seat's first MP.

=== Strong Labour Party majorities ===
Until 2005, the constituency statistically ranked in the top 20 safest Labour seats in the country by size of majority and by continuous representation by candidates from that party. In the 1983 and 1992 general elections, it was Labour's safest seat.

In the 2010 general election, Labour candidate Nick Smith gained the seat with a 29.2% swing from Independent back to Labour; as one of three seats Labour gained in that election where its government fell. The 2015 result made the seat the 30th safest of Labour's 232 seats by percentage of majority.

=== Period of independent representation ===
At the 2005 general election, the Labour Welsh Assembly Member Peter Law ran as an independent and won the seat. He had resigned from the Labour Party in protest at the imposition of an all-women candidates' shortlist following the retirement of incumbent MP Llew Smith and he overturned a 19,313 (60%) Labour majority with a significant 9,121 (25%) majority. In 2006 the Labour Party decided not to require an all-women shortlist at the next general election.

Law died of a brain tumour on 25 April 2006, prompting a by-election in the seat on 29 June. Labour failed to regain the seat as Law's former campaign manager, Dai Davies, was elected to replace him, beating Owen Smith, the Labour candidate who later became MP for Pontypridd.

=== Opposition parties ===
The Conservative Party and Liberal Democrats have both been very weak in the seat. From 1987 until 2017 neither had ever won 10% of the vote and the Conservatives had never achieved one eighth of the total votes cast. However, in 2015 the Conservatives achieved just under 15% of the vote, with Plaid Cymru in second place after Labour. In 2005 the Liberal Democrats received their lowest share of the vote in the United Kingdom and the Conservatives their second lowest, and both lost their deposits, though this particular election saw unusual circumstances.

The 2010 result was one of few where an independent candidate kept their deposit, winning in excess of 5% of the votes cast, and pushed one of the main three parties into fourth place; the independent Blaenau Gwent People's Voice group fielded no candidate in 2015. Three non-Labour candidates exceeded 5% of the vote (the deposit threshold) in 2015, the foremost locally being UKIP (who achieved nearly 18% of the vote), but the Lib Dem and Green candidates failed to retain their deposits.

== Boundaries ==
Map of boundaries 1983–2024

The constituency boundaries are coterminous with those of Blaenau Gwent county borough. The main towns are Ebbw Vale, Abertillery, Brynmawr and Tredegar.

== Members of Parliament ==
Election	Member	Party
1983	Michael Foot	Labour
1992	Llew Smith	Labour
2005	Peter Law	Independent
2006 by-election	Dai Davies	Independent
2010	Nick Smith	Labour
2024	Constituency abolished	

== Elections ==
=== Elections in the 1980s ===
General election 1983: Blaenau Gwent
Party	Candidate	Votes	%	±%
Labour	Michael Foot	30,113	70.0	N/A
Liberal	Gareth Atkinson	6,488	15.1	N/A
Conservative	Talmai Morgan	4,816	11.2	N/A
Plaid Cymru	Stephen Morgan	1,624	3.7	N/A
Majority		23,625	54.9	N/A
Turnout		43,041	76.8	N/A
Registered electors		55,948		
Labour win (new seat)				

General election 1987: Blaenau Gwent
Party	Candidate	Votes	%	±%
Labour	Michael Foot	32,820	75.9	+5.9
Conservative	Andrew Taylor	4,959	11.5	+0.3
Liberal	David McBride	3,847	8.9	−6.2
Plaid Cymru	Stephen Morgan	1,621	3.7	±0.0
Majority		27,861	64.4	+9.5
Turnout		43,247	77.2	+0.4
Registered electors		56,011		
Labour hold		Swing	+2.8	

=== Elections in the 1990s ===
General election 1992: Blaenau Gwent
Party	Candidate	Votes	%	±%
Labour	Llew Smith	34,333	79.0	+3.1
Conservative	David Melding	4,266	9.8	−1.7
Liberal Democrats	Alistair Burns	2,774	6.4	−2.5
Plaid Cymru (Green)	Alun Davies	2,099	4.8	+1.1
Majority		30,067	69.2	+4.8
Turnout		43,472	78.1	+0.9
Registered electors		55,638		
Labour hold		Swing	+2.4	

General election 1997: Blaenau Gwent
Party	Candidate	Votes	%	±%
Labour	Llew Smith	31,493	79.5	+0.5
Liberal Democrats	Geraldine Layton	3,458	8.7	+2.3
Conservative	Margrit A. Williams	2,607	6.6	−3.2
Plaid Cymru	Jim B. Criddle	2,072	5.2	+0.4
Majority		28,035	70.8	+1.6
Turnout		39,630	72.3	−5.8
Registered electors		54,815		
Labour hold		Swing		

=== Elections in the 2000s ===
General election 2001: Blaenau Gwent
Party	Candidate	Votes	%	±%
Labour	Llew Smith	22,855	72.0	−7.5
Plaid Cymru	Adam Rykala	3,542	11.2	+6.0
Liberal Democrats	Charles Townsend	2,945	9.3	+0.6
Conservative	Huw Williams	2,383	7.5	+0.9
Majority		19,313	60.8	−10.0
Turnout		31,725	59.5	−12.8
Registered electors		53,353		
Labour hold		Swing		

General election 2005: Blaenau Gwent
Party	Candidate	Votes	%	±%
Independent	Peter Law	20,505	58.2	N/A
Labour	Maggie Jones	11,384	32.3	−39.7
Liberal Democrats	Brian Thomas	1,511	4.3	−5.0
Plaid Cymru	John Price	843	2.4	−8.8
Conservative	Phillip Lee	816	2.4	−5.1
UKIP	Peter Osborne	192	0.5	N/A
Majority		9,121	25.9	N/A
Turnout		35,251	66.1	+6.6
Registered electors		53,301		
Independent gain from Labour		Swing	+48.9	

2006 Blaenau Gwent by-election
Party	Candidate	Votes	%	±%
Blaenau Gwent PV	Dai Davies (Note: Dai Davies, Peter Law's former agent, stood as an independent with the support of the Blaenau Gwent People's Voice Group.)	12,543	46.2	−12.0
Labour	Owen Smith	10,055	37.0	+4.7
Plaid Cymru	Steffan Lewis	1,755	6.5	+4.1
Liberal Democrats	Amy Kitcher	1,477	5.4	+1.1
Conservative	Margrit Williams	1,013	3.7	+1.3
Monster Raving Loony	Alan "Howling Laud" Hope	318	1.2	N/A
Majority		2,488	9.2	−16.7
Turnout		27,161	50.5	−15.6
Registered electors		52,512		
Independent hold		Swing	−8.4	

=== Elections in the 2010s ===
General election 2010: Blaenau Gwent
Party	Candidate	Votes	%	±%
Labour	Nick Smith	16,974	52.4	+20.1
Blaenau Gwent PV	Dai Davies	6,458	19.9	N/A
Liberal Democrats	Matt Smith	3,285	10.1	+5.8
Conservative	Liz Stevenson	2,265	7.0	+4.6
Plaid Cymru	Rhodri Davies	1,333	4.1	+1.7
BNP	Anthony King	1,211	3.7	N/A
UKIP	Michael Kocan	488	1.5	+1.0
Socialist Labour	Alyson O'Connell	381	1.2	N/A
Majority		10,516	32.5	N/A
Turnout		32,395	61.8	−4.3
Registered electors		52,442		
Labour gain from Blaenau Gwent PV		Swing	+29.2	

General election 2015: Blaenau Gwent
Party	Candidate	Votes	%	±%
Labour	Nick Smith	18,380	58.0	+5.6
UKIP	Susan Boucher	5,677	17.9	+16.4
Conservative	Tracey West	3,419	10.8	+3.8
Plaid Cymru	Steffan Lewis	2,849	9.0	+4.9
Green	Mark Pond	738	2.3	N/A
Liberal Democrats	Samuel Rees	620	2.0	−8.1
Majority		12,703	40.1	+7.6
Turnout		31,683	61.7	−0.1
Registered electors		51,335		
Labour hold		Swing	−5.4	

General election 2017: Blaenau Gwent
Party	Candidate	Votes	%	±%
Labour	Nick Smith	18,787	58.0	±0.0
Plaid Cymru	Nigel Copner	6,880	21.2	+12.2
Conservative	Tracey West	4,783	14.8	+4.0
UKIP	Dennis May	973	3.0	−14.9
Independent	Vicki Browning	666	2.1	N/A
Liberal Democrats	Cameron Sullivan	295	0.9	−1.1
Rejected ballots		35		
Majority		11,907	36.8	−3.3
Turnout		32,384	63.3	+1.6
Registered electors		51,176		
Labour hold		Swing	−6.1	

Of the 35 rejected ballots:

- 25 were either unmarked or it was uncertain who the vote was for.
- 9 voted for more than one candidate.
- 1 had writing or mark by which the voter could be identified.

General election 2019: Blaenau Gwent
Party	Candidate	Votes	%	±%
Labour	Nick Smith	14,862	49.2	−8.8
Brexit Party	Richard Taylor	6,215	20.6	N/A
Conservative	Laura Anne Jones	5,749	19.0	+4.2
Plaid Cymru	Peredur Owen Griffiths	1,722	5.7	−15.5
Liberal Democrats	Chelsea-Marie Annett	1,285	4.3	+3.4
Green	Stephen Priestnall	386	1.3	N/A
Rejected ballots		84		
Majority		8,647	28.6	−8.2
Turnout		30,219	59.6	−3.7
Registered electors		50,736		
Labour hold		Swing	−14.7	

Of the 84 rejected ballots:

- 44 were either unmarked or it was uncertain who the vote was for.
- 30 voted for more than one candidate.
- 10 had writing or mark by which the voter could be identified.

This was the largest decrease in the Plaid Cymru vote share at the 2019 general election.

== See also ==
- Blaenau Gwent (Senedd constituency)
- List of UK Parliament constituencies in Gwent
- List of UK Parliament constituencies in Wales

== Notes ==
Parliament of the United Kingdom
Preceded by Cardiff South East	Constituency represented by the leader of the opposition 1980–1983	Succeeded by Islwyn
