= Circuit of Wales =

Proposed race track in Blaenau Gwent, Wales

- Location: Ebbw Vale, Blaenau Gwent, Wales
- Coordinates: 51.80473°N 3.24319°W
- Major events: British motorcycle Grand Prix (proposed)

Full Course
- Surface: Asphalt
- Length: 3.50 mi (5.63 km)
- Turns: 21

Circuit of Wales (Welsh: Cylchffordd Cymru) was a proposed motor racing circuit and technology park development proposal in Blaenau Gwent on the outskirts of Ebbw Vale, Wales, adjacent to the Neath to Abergavenny Trunk Road (A465). The intention was that it would be funded by private investors and backed by the Welsh Government. In April 2016, BBC News reported that The Heads of the Valleys Development Company, would continue to negotiate with both the financial backers, Aviva, and the Welsh Government.

The circuit was designed to FIA and FIM standards with the aim of hosting events such as the MotoGP, Superbike World Championship, Motocross World Championship, British GT Championship, British Touring Car Championship and the World Touring Car Championship.

Ken Skates, AM and Economy Secretary, issued a statement on 29 March 2017 that detailed reports had been requested and the decision concerning £425M public funding would be available by mid-May. In June 2017, a proposed taxpayer-funded guarantee of £210million was rejected by the Welsh Government on the grounds that the financial risk was too great. The original planned opening had been 2016. In September 2018, an application to renew the expired planning consent was submitted to Blaenau Gwent County Borough Council.

In 2024 the council proposed repurposing the land for industrial or agricultural use.

== Proposal history ==
The project was unveiled towards the end of 2011. After submitting plans to Blaenau Gwent County Borough Council, the circuit received unanimous approval of its outline planning and was given the go ahead to begin development in early July 2013, amidst opposition from groups including Gwent Wildlife Trust, Brecon Beacons National Park, Natural Resources Wales and the Association of Motor Racing Circuit Owners. However, by the end of July, the Welsh Government put the plans on hold whilst it reviewed the planning application. The Welsh Government indicated in August 2013 that the local council would take decisions concerning the project. In 2014, the developers asked the Welsh and UK governments to commit up to £50m towards the scheme. While the developers believe that 6,000 jobs could be created, there are wider objections on environmental grounds.

In July 2014, Alun Davies, Blaenau Gwent AM was found to have broken the Ministerial Code through lobbying Natural Resources Wales in favour of the racetrack. He was sacked the following week.

In November 2014, controversy surfaced after allegations that the Welsh Government had interfered with due process on planning, particularly through gaining privileged information from the Planning Inspectorate. On 17 November 2015, it was reported that the Welsh government had given final approval to deregister the common land on which the circuit is to be built. Congestion at peak times on the Neath to Abergavenny Trunk Road would need to be resolved.

In April 2016, departing Welsh Economy Minister Edwina Hart confirmed that the Welsh Government could not provide the required 100% guarantee to back construction of the circuit. Insurance company Aviva had stated that it could not guarantee even 20% of the £357M package, and hence the Welsh Government had been forced to state its position. Hart said there was a "significant question around the viability of the project" and hence was an "unacceptable risk" to the government underwriting the entire project, and therefore she had "reluctantly come to the conclusion" not to proceed with the guarantee after legal advice. Michael Carrick, CEO of Heads of The Valleys Development Company, said negotiations with the Welsh Government and Aviva would continue.

In June 2017 a proposed taxpayer-funded guarantee of £210 million was rejected by the Welsh Government on the grounds that the financial risk was too great. Instead, ministers announced that £100million would be spent on an automotive business park. Michael Carrick responded by saying that they were keen to continue with the project, understand the reasons it was not supported, and address them. An application to renew the expired planning consent was submitted to Blaenau Gwent County Borough Council in September 2018.

In 2024, discussions were underway to include the area of the former proposed circuit in the Local Development Plan of Blaenau Gwent Council for industrial or agricultural use.

== See also ==
- Lake Torrent
