= Nick Smith (British politician) =

Welsh politician (born 1960)

Nick Smith MP
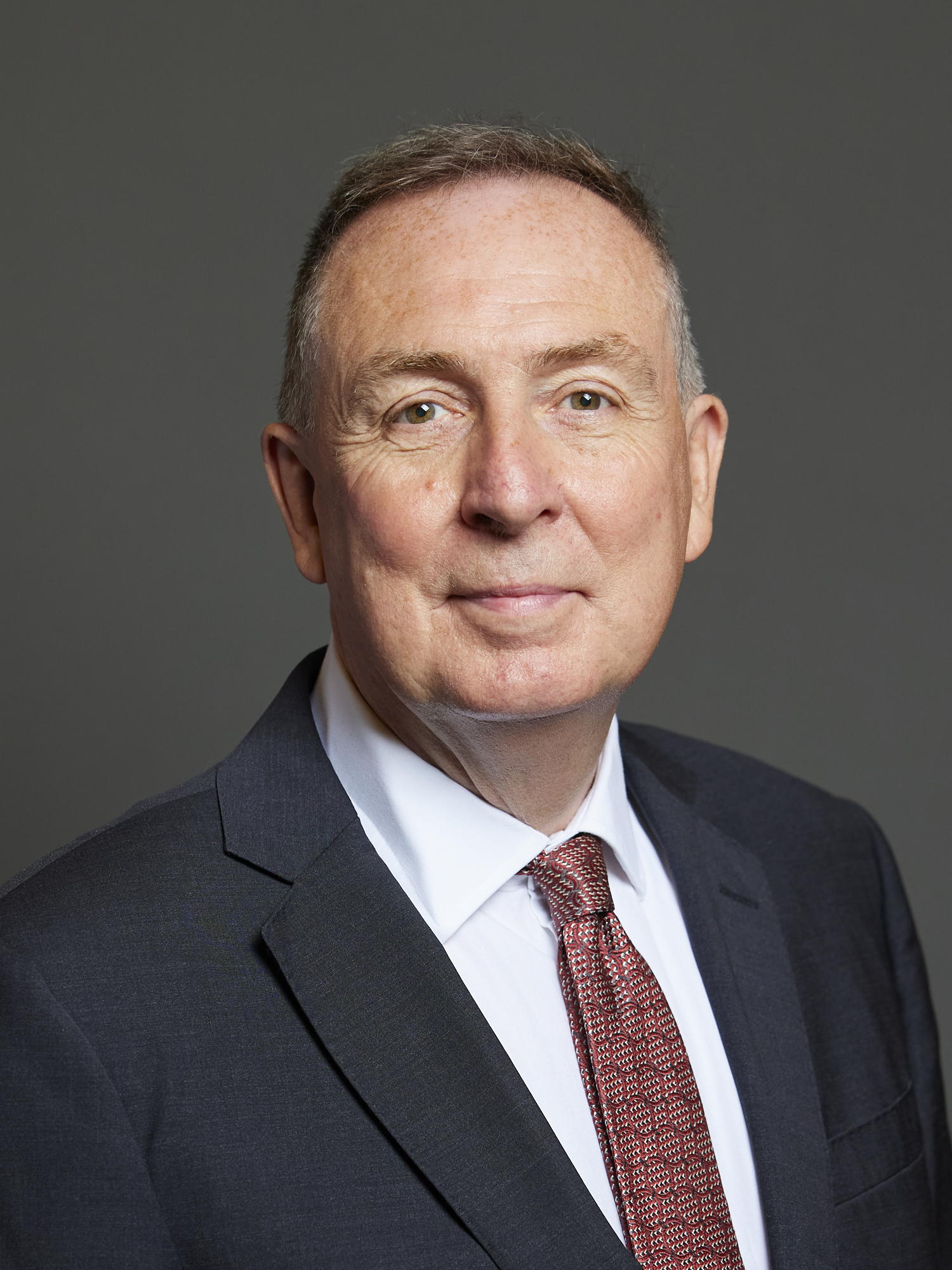
- Official portrait, 2024

Member of Parliament for Blaenau Gwent and Rhymney Blaenau Gwent (2010–2024)
- Incumbent
- Assumed office 6 May 2010
- Preceded by: Dai Davies
- Majority: 12,183 (40.7%)

Member of Camden Council for Kings Cross
- In office 7 May 1998 – 4 May 2006

Personal details
- Born: 14 January 1960 (age 66) Cardiff, Wales
- Party: Labour
- Spouse: Jenny Chapman (m. 2014)
- Children: 2
- Education: Birkbeck, University of London (MSc)
- Website: Official website

Nicholas Desmond John Smith (born 14 January 1960) is a Welsh politician serving as Member of Parliament (MP) for Blaenau Gwent and Rhymney, previously Blaenau Gwent, since 2010. A member of the Labour Party, he served as a Member of Camden Council from 1998 to 2006.

== Early life ==
Born in 1960 into a family of miners and steel workers, Smith grew up in Tredegar and was educated at its comprehensive school. As a young man Smith was a member of the Tredegar Workman's Hall Snooker Club. Now he co-chairs the parliamentary group in support of the sport. Smith went on to study at Birkbeck College, University of London, where he graduated with an MSc in Economic Change.

== Career ==
Smith became a Labour Party organiser in Wales, and later worked around the world as an International Democracy Adviser, for the Democratic Party in the United States, and for the Westminster Foundation for Democracy. His first significant job for the Labour Party was as agent for Frank Dobson in Holborn and St Pancras, and he later acted as agent for Emily Thornberry in her narrow victory in Islington South and Finsbury at the 2005 general election. He was an officer at the Labour Party's national headquarters from 1993 to 1998, where he was responsible for Labour's membership drive.

Smith was first elected to Camden London Borough Council in 1998, and was re-elected as a councillor in 2002. In 2003, he was appointed as the council's Cabinet member for Education, a post which he continued to hold for some months during 2005 while serving as Secretary General of the European Parliamentary Labour Party, in Brussels. From there, he became Campaigns Manager for the National Society for the Prevention of Cruelty to Children, and his last full-time job before his arrival in the House of Commons was as Director of Policy and Partnerships at the Royal College of Speech and Language Therapists.

Smith was selected as Labour's prospective parliamentary candidate for Blaenau Gwent in 2007 and was elected as its Member of Parliament on 6 May 2010, defeating the incumbent Independent Dai Davies. Davies criticised Smith's record in Camden, calling him a product of "Blairite New Labour", while Smith had responded by calling this "personal mud-slinging" and "playing the man and not the ball".

In one of the strongest showings for Labour in Wales, Nick Smith won by more than 10,000 votes on a 61.94 per cent turnout. Voter turnout was up by 19.6 per cent from the previous election in 2006.

The 20.1 percentage point increase in the Labour share of the vote was higher than in any other seat in Britain. The swing from Independent to Labour was 29.2 per cent, the largest in the UK.

On his election success, Smith commented "The local population and the Blaenau Gwent Labour Party have shared values, and that's come through in this result tonight." He also said he had promised Michael Foot he would return Blaenau Gwent to Labour.

In the 2015 general election Smith increased his majority to 58% of the share of the vote, gaining 18,380 votes (+5.6%). Blaenau Gwent now has the highest Labour share of the vote in Wales. The July 2017 general election produced almost a replica of the result two years earlier, with Smith taking 58% of the vote and winning 18,787 votes. Speaking after the announcement, Smith said: "Today the voters of Blaenau Gwent shared my belief that our best hope to get our country moving again is a Labour government. Blaenau Gwent needs more jobs, improved transport, proper funding for our frontline services and only a Labour government in Westminster can do that."

Nick Smith campaigned against leaving the European Union. This was contrary to the desires of his constituency, Blaenau Gwent, who voted to leave and were labelled "Wales' most pro-Brexit town".

In the December 2019 general election Smith won the seat once more, with 14,862 votes (49.18% of those cast), ahead of Richard Taylor (of the Brexit Party) who took 6,215 votes, Laura Anne Jones (Conservative) on 5,749 and Peredur Owen Griffiths (Plaid Cymru) on 1,722. Smith said he was delighted to be elected for his third term but acknowledged that it had been a difficult night for the Labour party as a whole. He said: "I'm extremely grateful to be voted in by the people of Blaenau Gwent, but I'm sad that we're going to have to put up with a Tory rampant administration for the next five years. "I'm going to work very hard here now to make sure to keep up my good community links and make sure we build the party to come back stronger." Smith was an early supporter of Keir Starmer in his Labour leadership bid in 2020.

== Member of Parliament ==
Blaenau Gwent is a seat with a strong Labour heritage. Aneurin Bevan, the post-war Health Minister responsible for creating the National Health Service, and Michael Foot, a former leader of the Labour Party, both held the seat in the second half of the twentieth century. Smith's campaign formed the subject of a Progress pamphlet entitled "Organising to Win" which highlighted the successful tactics he had used to win back the seat for Labour.

Smith made his maiden speech in Parliament on 8 June 2010. He praised the cultural and political heritage of the constituency, and promised to campaign strongly on improving public health, the prospects for young people, and economic growth. As a backbench member, he has led the call for the Government to respond to the collapse of care home provider Southern Cross, bringing the Minister of Health responsible for care services, Paul Burstow, to answer questions before the House, and raising the issue with David Cameron at Prime Minister's Questions.

In 2013, he continued his care home campaigning after the collapse of Operation Jasmine, an £11m seven-year investigation into neglect and abuse in care homes in South Wales. He backed the "Justice for Jasmine" campaign and calls for both a review into the case. He also called for the Care Bill going through parliament to include an amendment that would allow care home owners to be prosecuted for instances of neglect under their care. The Welsh Government announced an Independent Review into the case in December 2013. The Criminal Justice and Courts Bill in 2014 was amended to include laws so staff, managers and directors could face jail sentences for abuse and wilful neglect in their care – with the companies being fined and publicly named for their role in any abuse.

On entering Parliament, Smith was elected to the Public Accounts Committee, responsible for monitoring value for money in public spending. He has highlighted a number of instances of the Ministry of Defence overspending, including changes to the requirements of the two Queen Elizabeth-class aircraft carriers that added billions of pounds to the cost of the contracts. Since his election, he has highlighted the "pathetic" tax contributions of the likes of Amazon, who paid £2.4m in UK tax in 2012 despite £4.3bn in sales.

He was promoted when Douglas Alexander, Shadow Foreign Secretary, appointed him as his Parliamentary Private Secretary and a junior member of Labour's Foreign Affairs team. In September 2015, Smith was promoted to the Shadow DEFRA team as the Minister for Food, Farming and Rural Affairs. He resigned on 29 June 2016, saying that Jeremy Corbyn did not have the leadership skills needed. After the election Smith was appointed as an Opposition Whip. Smith was the Labour Whip and Teller, reading the result to Parliament when Prime Minister May's Brexit deal fell to a record breaking defeat.

Smith's campaigns have included criticising the interest rates that poor families are charged by the rent-to-own sector for buying household appliances. The Financial Conduct Authority announced in May 2018 that it was considering a cap on the sector, a move Smith called "a big step forward".

Since 2017, Smith has defended local steelworkers affected by the British Steel Pension Scheme scandal, including many across South Wales. In 2022, he led the Public Accounts Committee's investigation into the scandal, which found that the Financial Conduct Authority had failed to protect British Steel pension scheme members causing "serious financial harm", which Smith added showed "how badly they were treated, and where the FCA failed to support them in their hour of need.".

He served on the Progress Strategy Board from 2012 to 2014. He is a current member of the Tribune Group.

== Campaign for Mineworkers ==
Smith successfully campaigned for the £1.5bn Mineworkers Pension Scheme transfer reserve to be returned to former mineworkers to give former miners a fairer deal, “overturning an historic injustice and ensuring fair payouts for years to come”.

Smith, who comes from a family of mineworkers, including his three uncles on his mother’s side began campaigning on this issue around December 2017 and over the following seven years championed the cause, asking questions in the House of Commons, writing letters calling for action, challenging Prime Minister Boris Johnson when a promise he made on this issue during the 2019 election was not fulfilled, and helping to secure a Select Committee inquiry which supported the case for the money to be returned to mineworker pensioners.

In its 2024 election manifesto The Labour Party pledged to “end the injustice of the Mineworkers' Pension Scheme”, a promise that was fulfilled when, in her budget of October 2024, Chancellor Rachel Reeves MP announced that the Labour Government would be transferring the Mineworkers Pensions Scheme Investment Reserve Fund back to its members, translating to an immediate uplift of £29 a week on average for members.

Reeves referred to Smith directly in her budget speech saying that she had “listened closely to [her] Honourable Friends for Easington, Doncaster Central, Blaenau Gwent, and Ayr, Carrick and Cumnock on this issue.”

Blaenau Gwent & Rhymney saw the highest number of mineworker pensioners receive the uplift in Wales with 1622 pension scheme members in the constituency. Smith adopted this saying: “My fellow coalfield MPs and I have been campaigning for a fairer deal for mineworkers for a long time, it is fantastic to see our Labour government righting this wrong and returning what is owed to mineworkers and their families.

== Activities and promotion ==
Smith ran his first London Marathon in 2018 for Hospice of the Valleys, a Blaenau Gwent charity which provides palliative care. He has since campaigned on more support for initiatives such as Parkrun and efforts to tackle childhood obesity such as a ban on junk food advertising before 9pm. Smith chairs the All Party Parliamentary Group on Parkrun and has promoted physical activity for improved public health and to help address obesity.

In the 2023 British shadow cabinet reshuffle, he was appointed to the front bench as Shadow Deputy Leader of the House of Commons. In the 2024 Parliament Smith was appointed to the House of Commons Commission which has overall responsibility for the administration and services of the House of Commons. Smith was also elected as Chair of the House of Commons Administration Committee.

Since October 2024 Smith has been a member of the House of Commons Commission, the committee responsible for the administration and services of the House of Commons, including the maintenance of the Palace of Westminster and the rest of the Parliamentary Estate. Smith was elected as Chair of the Administration Committee on Tuesday, November 26, 2024. The Administration Committee considers services provided for Members, their staff and visitors by the House of Commons Service and makes recommendations to the House of Commons Commission. Speaking about his role Smith said: “I am delighted to have been elected by my colleagues as Chair of the House of Commons Administration Committee. There’s much for the Committee to be getting on with in this Parliament, and while MPs will be focusing on a busy legislative agenda, we’ll also be making sure that the House is working as effectively as possible to support MPs in their work.”

Smith was elected as chair of the Bevan Society in January 2025. The Aneurin Bevan Society is an organisation which aims to “support and promote the values held by Aneurin Bevan” and promote the life and work of Bevan.

== Motion of no confidence passed by local party members ==
On 11 October 2023 a motion of no confidence in Smith was passed by Members of Blaenau Gwent Constituency Labour Party. Minutes of the meeting were provided to Welsh news service Nation.Cymru describing conflict with their MP among party members:

"The motion was moved and seconded and the Chair opened the floor for discussion. Some members expressed a sense of conflict that they agreed with the motion and the strength of feeling amongst members but also felt that the priority needed to be getting the Tories out. There was a general feeling of a lack of confidence in the MP's acknowledgement and representation of members' views". Comments made included members saying they didn't feel they could knock doors for the MP and that the CLP Constituency Labour Party needed a candidate that it could get behind in the election. A member read out a communication from the MP sending apologies to the meeting as he was campaigning in Tamworth, England. A vote on the motion of no confidence was taken. Some 16 members voted in favour, six against and there were three abstentions. The article continues: A longstanding member of Blaenau Gwent CLP, who did not wish to be named, said: "People on the left in the local party have been unhappy with Nick Smith for a long time, but now he has opponents on the right who are against him too. He doesn't seem to be interested in the views of ordinary members and a lot of his local activity seems to be geared to photo opportunities. There's unhappiness that he has been reselected automatically for the expanded seat of Blaenau Gwent and Rhymney."

The motion of no confidence was described as being “unlikely to affect his candidacy at the next general election.” At the 2024 general election, Smith was elected with “by a landslide with over 16,000 votes”, and with a majority of 12,183 - Labour’s highest majority in Wales. Following the general election, Smith celebrated the win with a “very well-attended” event for party members which he said showed “what a strong and united campaign we ran locally.”

== Personal life ==
Smith has two daughters from his first marriage and lives in Nantyglo. He married secondly fellow Labour MP, now member of the House of Lords Jenny Chapman, Baroness Chapman of Darlington in July 2014. He previously lived in Camden Town.

Smith is a keen hiker, and is the President of his borough's Red Ramblers organisation. He is also President of Ebbw Valley Brass. He is a member of the Parc Bryn Bach Running Club in Tredegar and chairs the parliamentary group in support of parkrun.

== See also ==
- 2006 Blaenau Gwent by-elections
- Labour Party leadership of Keir Starmer

Parliament of the United Kingdom
Preceded by Dai Davies	Member of Parliament for Blaenau Gwent; 2010–2024	Constituency abolished
New constituency	Member of Parliament for Blaenau Gwent and Rhymney; 2024–present	Incumbent
