= Trish Law =

British politician (born 1954)

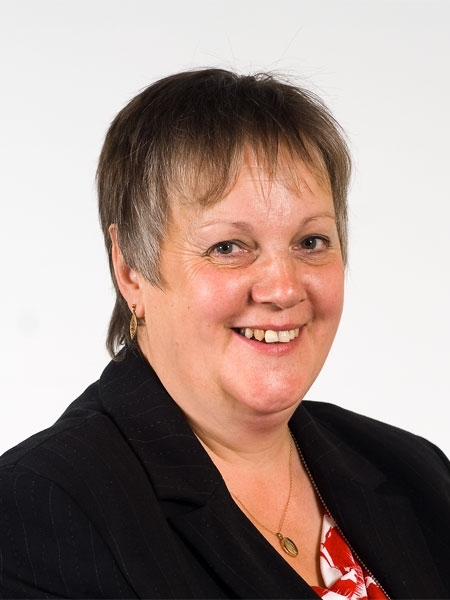
- Official portrait, 2007

Member of the Welsh Assembly for Blaenau Gwent
- In office 29 June 2006 – 31 March 2011
- Preceded by: Peter Law
- Succeeded by: Alun Davies
- Majority: 5,357 (22.8%)

Personal details
- Born: Patricia Bolter; 17 March 1954 (age 72) Nantyglo, Blaenau Gwent, Wales
- Party: Independent (2010-present)
- Other political affiliations: Blaenau Gwent People's Voice (2006-2010)
- Spouse: Peter Law (died 2006)
- Children: 5

Patricia Law (née Bolter; born 17 March 1954) is a Welsh politician who was the Blaenau Gwent People's Voice AM for Blaenau Gwent in Wales between 2006 and 2011.

== Background ==
Patricia Bolter was born in Nantyglo, Blaenau Gwent, in 1954. She was educated in Nantyglo Junior School, Glanyravon Secondary Modern School and Ebbw Vale College. She trained as a Nursing Assistant in an EMI unit for Gwent Healthcare NHS Trust, before marrying Peter Law. The couple were married for 30 years and had five children and one grandchild.

During Peter Law's term as AM and MP, Trish Law worked in his constituency office. She was Mayoress of Blaenau Gwent in 1988–89, Secretary of Abertillery and Blaina Inner Wheel Club (Rotary) and for a short period of time was Secretary of the League of Friends at Blaina Hospital.

== Political career ==
After Peter Law's resignation from the Labour Party due to the imposition of an all-women shortlist, and later death from a brain tumour on 25 April 2006, Trish Law was supported by Blaenau Gwent People's Voice Group, the group formed by those who helped Peter Law overturn a 19,000 Labour majority at the 2005 General Election. She won the seat at a by-election on 29 June 2006. Labour also failed to regain the Westminster seat as Peter Law's former campaign manager, Dai Davies, was elected to replace him.

Following her election, the National Assembly for Wales became the first UK legislature to have a female majority of representatives. Although an independent, Law backed Labour's Assembly Budget after Finance Minister Sue Essex accepted two of her demands: a commitment that women's refuges will be set up in all Welsh counties that don't currently have one; and the opening of a therapy centre in Blaenau Gwent for people suffering from depression, stress and low self-esteem. This and other campaigns meant Law won the BBC Wales award for Campaigning Politician of the Year.

Law won re-election as an independent at the 2007 National Assembly for Wales election.

In November 2008, Law attempted to prevent a reading by poet Patrick Jones, arranged by Liberal Democrat AM Peter Black and scheduled to take place in the buildings of the Welsh Assembly on 11 December 2008. Jones had been invited by Black to give a reading from his book Darkness Is Where the Stars Are, after the bookseller Waterstone's had cancelled a launch event for the book following threats to disrupt the event from Christian fundamentalist group Christian Voice, led by Stephen Green.

Notwithstanding that the UK's blasphemy law had been repealed, Law wrote to Welsh Parliament Presiding Officer Dafydd Elis-Thomas to ask him to forbid the reading, saying: "I am disgusted that, two weeks before Christmas Day, it is proposed to proceed with the reading of blasphemous poems which are an insult to Jesus Christ and to all his followers."

Her request for censorship was refused, Assembly Commission chief executive Claire Clancy saying: "Neither officials nor the Assembly Commission make judgments on the nature or purpose of these events, except to ensure they would not give rise to any legal problems. Assembly buildings are public buildings, and secular in character. It is our responsibility to ensure that events sponsored by any Assembly Members are always allowed to take place without fear of disruption or intimidation, while respecting the right to peaceful protest."

In August 2010, Law indicated that she would not seek re-election at the 2011 Assembly election.

== Offices held ==
Senedd
Preceded by Peter Law	Assembly Member for Blaenau Gwent; 2006- 2011	Succeeded by Alun Davies
