= Peter Law =

Welsh politician (1948–2006)

- Official portrait, c. 2003

Member of Parliament for Blaenau Gwent
- In office 5 May 2005 – 25 April 2006
- Preceded by: Llew Smith
- Succeeded by: Dai Davies
- Majority: 9,121 (25.9%)

Secretary for Local Government and Regeneration
- In office 6 May 1999 – 17 June 2000
- First Minister: Alun Michael
- Preceded by: Office created
- Succeeded by: Edwina Hart

Member of the Welsh Assembly for Blaenau Gwent
- In office 6 May 1999 – 25 April 2006
- Preceded by: New Assembly
- Succeeded by: Trish Law
- Majority: 11736 (59.4%)

Personal details
- Born: Peter John Law; 1 April 1948 Abergavenny, Monmouthshire, Wales
- Died: 25 April 2006 (aged 58) Nantyglo, Gwent (county), Wales
- Party: Blaenau Gwent People's Voice (2005-2006); Independent (2005); Labour and Co-operative (before 2005)
- Spouse: Trish Law
- Children: 3 daughters, 2 sons
- Education: Open University
- Occupation: Grocer, NHS Trust Chair

Peter John Law (1 April 1948 – 25 April 2006) was a Welsh politician. For most of his career Law sat as a Labour councillor and subsequently Labour Co-operative Assembly member (AM) for Blaenau Gwent. Latterly he sat as an independent member of Parliament (MP) and AM for the same constituency.

Law resigned from the Labour Party in 2005. In the 2005 general election, he defeated the Labour candidate by over 9,000 votes. The Daily Telegraph described his victory as "one of the most spectacular general election results of modern times".

== Early life ==
Born in Abergavenny, Law was educated at Grofield Secondary School and then attended Nant-y-Glo Community College. He later studied at the Open University. He ran a General Store between 1964 and 1987. He was subsequently appointed chair of Gwent Healthcare NHS Trust.

== Political career ==
Law served as a councillor for Nantyglo and Blaenau Urban District Council between 1970 and 1974. He continued to serve as a councillor on Blaenau Gwent County Borough Council until 1999 and was appointed mayor for 1988-1989.

He was latterly a close ally of Llew Smith, MP for Blaenau Gwent from 1992, and was selected for the constituency in the first elections to the National Assembly for Wales in 1999, winning the seat easily. He was appointed to the cabinet of Alun Michael as Assembly Secretary for Local Government and Housing, but lost his post in a cabinet reshuffle in 2000 by successor First Minister for Wales Rhodri Morgan.

When Morgan formed a coalition government with the Liberal Democrats, Law made no secret of his opposition to the decision and was not retained in the administration. He became a vociferous backbench critic and following his re-election with an increased majority in the 2003 election he stood as candidate for the Deputy Presiding Officer of the Welsh Assembly. However, the Labour AMs voted instead for John Marek who was an independent AM, thereby ensuring that an opposition member was in the Chair and unable to vote against the Welsh Assembly Government.

=== 2005 general election ===
Law left the Labour Party in protest at the use of an all-woman shortlist in selecting the candidate for the general election, which was used to replace the retiring Llew Smith. Law believed all-woman shortlists were being selectively imposed on local parties only where a leadership-supported male candidate was unlikely to be selected, citing the example of Ed Balls and Pat McFadden as new leadership-supported male candidates, and noting that use of all-woman shortlists had been stopped in Scotland.

Smith had enjoyed a majority of 19,313, making it the safest parliamentary seat in Wales. Prior to the announcement of Law's rumoured candidacy, his Labour opponent Maggie Jones stated that Law would be "very foolish" to stand against her. She argued "Blaenau Gwent is solidly Labour and I don't think people will vote for anyone else."

Law won the seat with 58.2% of the vote, defeating Labour candidate Maggie Jones, and gaining a majority of 9,121 votes. He campaigned while recovering from surgery for a brain tumour. Law initially withdrew from the election on 4 April upon receiving the news of his tumour, but he was persuaded to continue standing, receiving treatment throughout the campaign.

Shortly after his victory, Law highlighted his former party's failure to acknowledge the problems with the use of all-women short-lists, stating: "What I find very strange is that even after the result in Blaenau Gwent, there is no one in the party [Labour] who is prepared to admit that they were wrong." Law noted Prime Minister Tony Blair's initial misgivings about the shortlist and how this contrasted with the views of his wife Cherie Blair, questioning whether she had excessive influence over the party's national leader.

Law's independent position had a particularly significant impact in the Welsh Assembly, as it meant that Labour lost its majority. As a result, the party suffered a number of defeats by combined opposition parties who, when they agreed to do so, were able to vote down Labour policies.

Law was the third Welsh MP or AM to win a constituency as both a party candidate and an independent, following S. O. Davies, the MP for Merthyr Tydfil from 1934 until his death in 1972, who was deselected by the local Labour Party on grounds of age prior to the 1970 general election, but ran against the official candidate as an independent and won; and John Marek, who remained AM for Wrexham, later forming his own party, Forward Wales.

=== Parliamentary career ===
Law won the award of Welsh Politician of the Year by both BBC Wales and the Wales Yearbook.

== Personal life ==
Law married Trish Bolter in 1976 and they have three daughters and two sons. They lived in Nantyglo.

== Death and legacy ==
Law died at his home in Nantyglo, aged 58, suffering from a recurrent brain tumour first diagnosed during the 2005 election campaign. As a result of his death, there were by-elections in Blaenau Gwent for both the UK Parliament and the Welsh Assembly seats. In the by-elections Law's former agent, Dai Davies, won the election to Law's former Westminster seat, while his widow Trish Law succeeded him in the Welsh Assembly. Both stood under the banner of the Blaenau Gwent People's Voice Group.

His widow has claimed that he was offered a peerage to not stand against Labour in Blaenau Gwent in 2005, an allegation denied by Labour. The claim had considerable media impact because of the ongoing Cash for Peerages police investigation.

Law's funeral was held on Thursday 4 May 2006, at Christchurch in Ebbw Vale, exactly a year after he was elected to parliament. Some schools and businesses closed in order to allow people to see the cortège, and people lined the streets, with the funeral described as the biggest in the town since that of Nye Bevan. Law was cremated at Gwent Crematorium. On 10 May 2006 a thanksgiving service took place at St Paul's Church for those unable to get a seat or unable to attend Law's funeral.

In December 2007 a memorial concert in honour of Law was held locally, with the proceeds raised donated to Hospice of the Valleys. On 10 December 2007 a plaque in Law's honour was also installed at the new Ebbw Vale Parkway railway station, with the location chosen to mark his years of campaigning for a railway link to Cardiff to be restored for the community.

== Offices held ==
Senedd
Preceded by (new post)	Assembly Member for Blaenau Gwent; 1999–2006	Succeeded by Trish Law
Political offices
Preceded by (new post)	Minister for Local Government and Regeneration; 1999–2000	Succeeded by Edwina Hart
Parliament of the United Kingdom
Preceded by Llew Smith	Member of Parliament for Blaenau Gwent; 2005–2006	Succeeded by Dai Davies

== See also ==
- List of United Kingdom MPs with the shortest service
