= 2006 Blaenau Gwent by-elections =

Two parliamentary by-elections in South Wales in 2006

By-elections for both the United Kingdom parliamentary and Welsh assembly constituencies of Blaenau Gwent were held on 29 June 2006, triggered by death of incumbent independent Member of Parliament (MP) and Assembly Member (AM) Peter Law on 25 April 2006. Law's successors won both seats: Dai Davies—Law's former election agent—won the UK parliamentary by-election as an independent with support from the Blaenau Gwent People's Voice (BGPV); meanwhile, Trish Law—Peter's widow—who also ran as an independent on a BGPV ticket, won her husband's former seat in the Welsh Assembly.

Law denied the Labour Party a victory in the AM by-election which would have restored their majority in the Welsh Assembly; they lost it when her husband was expelled from the party.

Davies was the first independent to hold a seat previously occupied by another independent in a by-election since Sir Charles Townshend won the November 1920 The Wrekin by-election. The by-elections were held on the same day 2006 Bromley and Chislehurst by-election.

== Westminster by-election ==
2006 Blaenau Gwent by-election
- 29 June 2006

The Blaenau Gwent seat in the UK House of Commons. Triggered by death of incumbent
- Turnout: 50.5% (▼15.6%)
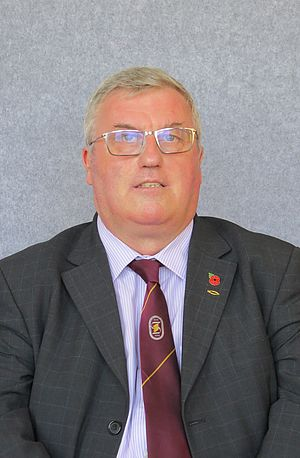

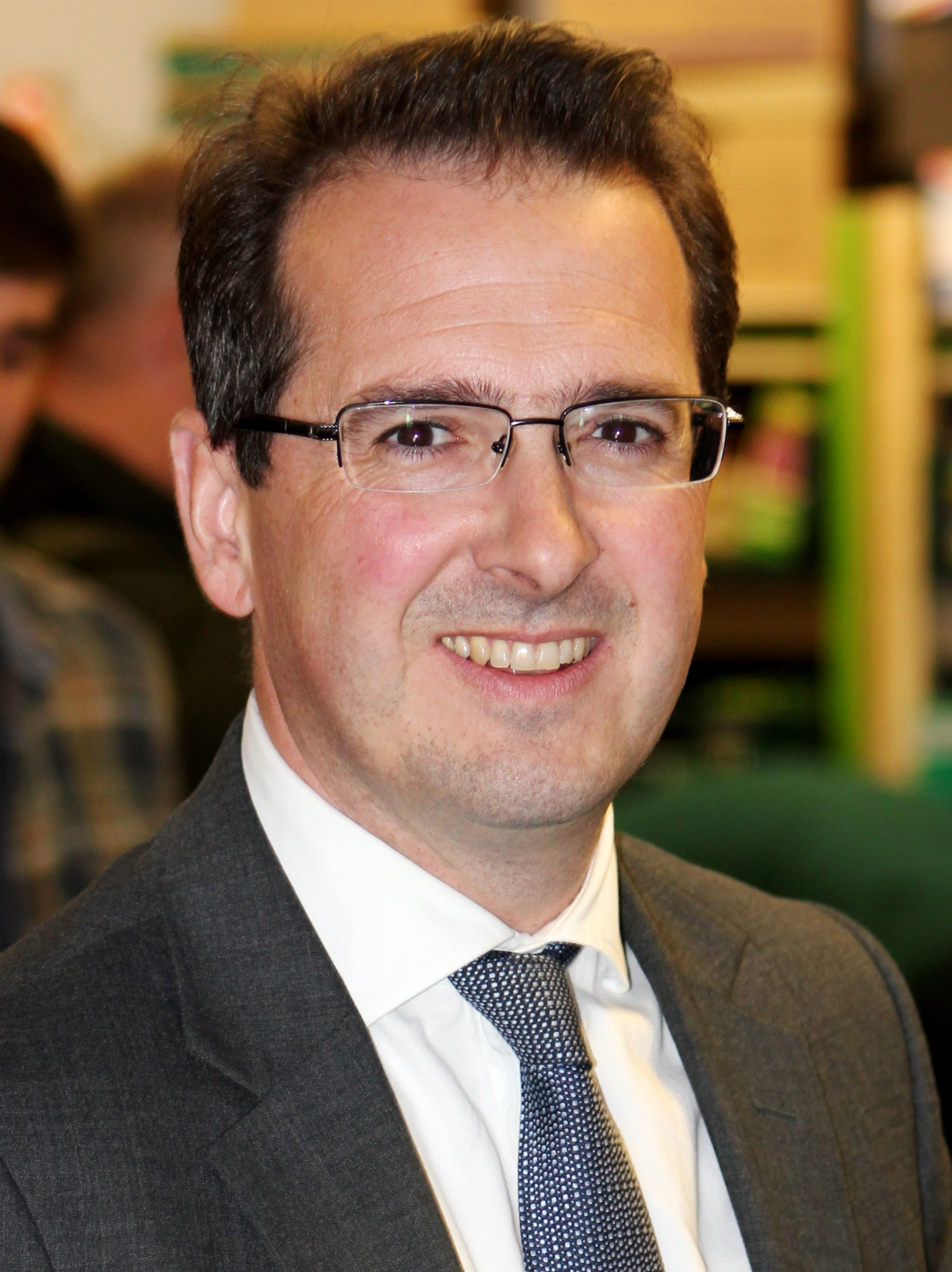

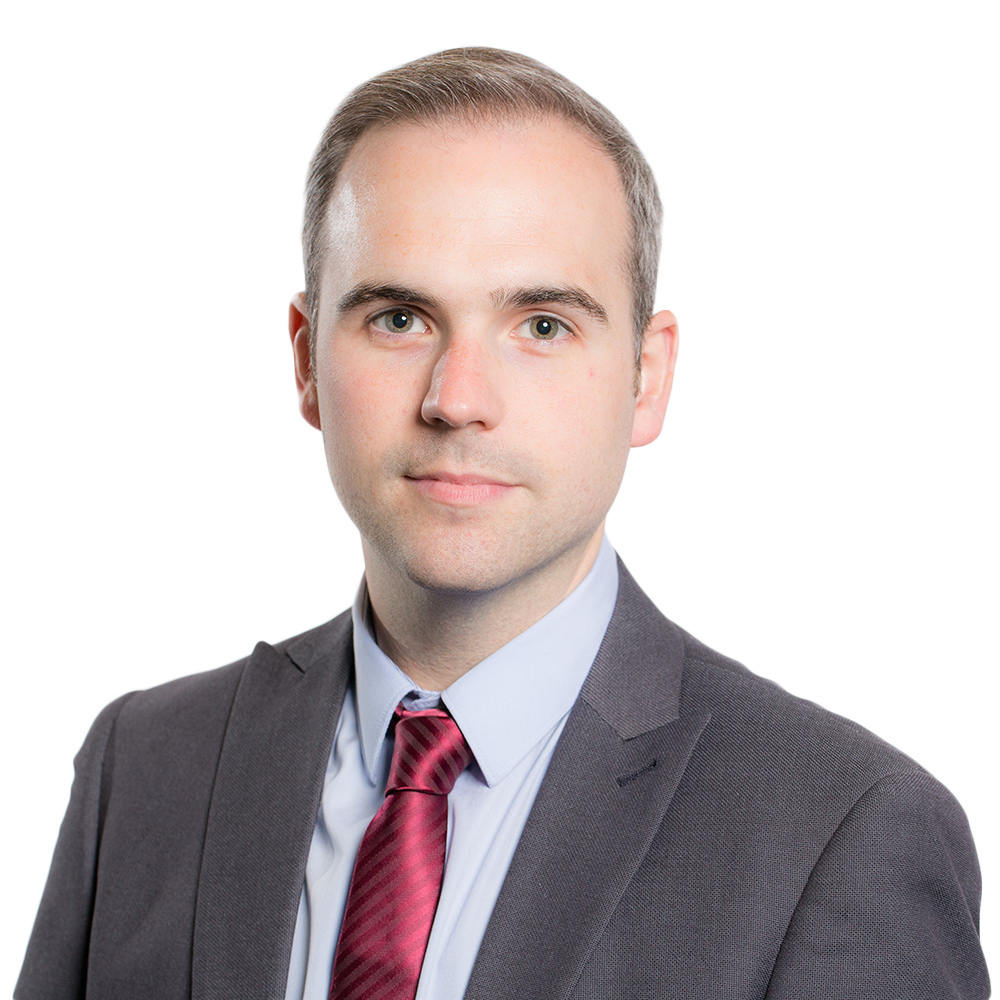
	First party	Second party
Candidate	Dai Davies	Owen Smith
Party	Blaenau Gwent PV	Labour
Popular vote	12,543	10,055
Percentage	46.7	37.0
Swing	▼11.5%*	▲4.7%
	Third party	Fourth party
		LD
Candidate	Steffan Lewis	Amy Kitcher
Party	Plaid Cymru	Liberal Democrats
Popular vote	1,755	1,477
Percentage	6.5	5.4
Swing	▲4.1%	▲1.1%
MP before election
Peter Law
Blaenau Gwent PV
Subsequent MP
Dai Davies
Blaenau Gwent PV

The writ for the UK Parliament by-election was moved on 6 June so that it would be held on the same date as the Assembly by-election, (29 June 2006). Labour whips had reportedly pressed for the election to be held on 25 May. The movement of the writ was more complicated because Law sat as an independent, and therefore the convention that the party of the former member moves the writ cannot apply. According to the precedent (when Dennis Canavan resigned his Parliamentary seat at Westminster as an independent), the whip of the governing party moves the writ.

=== Candidates ===
Maggie Jones, the Labour candidate who had been defeated by Law at the 2005 general election, was not able to stand, because she had been elevated to the House of Lords. There had been speculation about an independent candidate running with the backing of the Conservatives, Liberal Democrats and Plaid Cymru, but all three parties decided to contest the election.

It had been reported that prior to Law's death that the Labour Party had decided against selecting their candidate for the next general election with an all-women shortlist. It was the use of such a shortlist for the 2005 general election that led to Law standing as an independent. Labour instead left the selection to the local party. The Labour candidate, Owen Smith, was chosen on 8 May. He was a former special adviser and BBC producer who worked for a pharmaceutical company. After losing this by-election, Smith went on to become MP for Pontypridd at the 2010 general election, and in 2016 launched an unsuccessful campaign to lead the Labour party, remaining in Parliament until the 2019 general election.

The Liberal Democrat candidate was Amy Kitcher. The Conservatives stood Margrit Williams, who worked for Sir Malcolm Rifkind. Dai Davies, Peter Law's former agent, stood as an independent with the support of the Blaenau Gwent People's Voice Group.

Despite contesting both the previous Assembly and Parliamentary elections, the United Kingdom Independence Party decided not to stand a candidate, instead calling for a vote for the Blaenau Gwent People's Voice Group - even though the Group does not support withdrawal from the European Union, nor the abolition of the Welsh Assembly, key UKIP policies.

The Conservative fifth place was their worst position in a UK mainland by-election since at least 1945.

=== Result ===
Blaenau Gwent by-election, 2006
Party	Candidate	Votes	%	±%
Blaenau Gwent PV	Dai Davies	12,543	46.7	−11.5
Labour	Owen Smith	10,055	37.0	+4.7
Plaid Cymru	Steffan Lewis	1,755	6.5	+4.1
Liberal Democrats	Amy Kitcher	1,477	5.4	+1.1
Conservative	Margrit Williams	1,013	3.7	+1.3
Monster Raving Loony	Alan "Howling Laud" Hope	318	1.2	N/A
Majority		2,488	9.7	−16.2
Turnout		27,161	50.5	−15.6
Registered electors		52,512		
Blaenau Gwent PV hold		Swing	−8.4	

=== Previous result ===
The 2005 general election result, in the election for the Parliamentary seat, was a gain for Peter Law as an independent candidate.

General election 2005: Blaenau Gwent
Party	Candidate	Votes	%	±%
Independent	Peter Law	20,505	58.2	+58.2
Labour	Maggie Jones	11,384	32.3	−39.7
Liberal Democrats	Brian Thomas	1,511	4.3	−5.0
Plaid Cymru	John Price	843	2.4	−8.8
Conservative	Phillip Lee	816	2.4	−5.2
UKIP	Peter Osborne	192	0.5	+0.5
Majority		9,121	25.9	N/A
Turnout		35,251	66.1	+6.6
Registered electors		53,301		
Independent gain from Labour		Swing	+48.9	

== Welsh Assembly by-election ==
2006 Blaenau Gwent by-election
- 29 June 2006

The Blaenau Gwent seat in the National Assembly for Wales. Triggered by death of incumbent
- Turnout: 49.6% (▲12.2%)
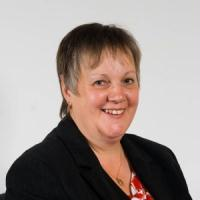
	First party	Second party	Third party
		Lab	LD
Candidate	Trish Law	John Hopkins	Steve Bard
Party	Blaenau Gwent PV	Labour	Liberal Democrats
Popular vote	13,785	9,321	2,054
Percentage	50.3	34.0	7.5
Swing	N/A	▼36.2%	▼3.4%
AM before election
Peter Law
Blaenau Gwent PV
Subsequent AM
Trish Law
Blaenau Gwent PV

The Assembly by-election had to be held within twelve weeks of the vacancy arising. It was announced on 11 May 2006 that the Assembly by-election would be held on 29 June.

=== Candidates ===
Labour chose John Hopkins, who had already been selected as their 2007 Assembly election candidate, to contest the seat. John Price stood for Plaid Cymru. The Liberal Democrats fielded Steve Bard, a councillor in Abertillery. The Conservative candidate was Jonathan Burns, a Cardiff councillor. Peter Law's widow, Trish Law, stood as an independent backed by the Blaenau Gwent People's Voice Group.

The Green Party fought the Assembly election but did not stand at Westminster.

=== Result ===
Blaenau Gwent Welsh Assembly by-election
Party	Candidate	Votes	%	±%
Blaenau Gwent PV	Trish Law	13,785	50.3	N/A
Labour	John Hopkins	9,321	34.0	−36.2
Liberal Democrats	Steve Bard	2,054	7.5	−3.4
Plaid Cymru	John Price	1,109	4.0	−5.6
Conservative	Jonathan Burns	816	3.0	−2.7
Green	John Matthews	302	1.1	N/A
Majority		4,464	16.3	N/A
Turnout		27,387	49.6	+12.2
Registered electors		52,900		
Blaenau Gwent PV gain from Labour		Swing	+43.3	

=== Previous result ===
In 2003, Peter Law was re-elected as the Labour Assembly member for the Blaenau Gwent constituency. By announcing that he would stand as an independent for the parliamentary constituency he expelled himself from the Labour Party (and the Labour Assembly grouping).

Welsh Assembly Election 2003: Blaenau Gwent
Party	Candidate	Votes	%	±%
Labour	Peter Law	13,884	70.2	+9.4
Liberal Democrats	Steve Bard	2,148	10.9	−0.6
Plaid Cymru	Rhys Ab Elis	1,889	9.6	−11.6
Conservative	Barrie O'Keefe	1,131	5.7	+0.2
UKIP	Roger Thomas	719	3.6	+3.6
Majority		11,736	59.4	+18.7
Turnout		19,771	37.4	−10.7
Labour hold		Swing		
Registered electors		52,927		

== Electorate and campaign timetables ==
The electorate for the constituency was 52,900 as quoted by the Returning Officer's Department of Blaenau Gwent Borough Council on 14 May 2006 (-0.75% on the Westminster election and -0.05% on the Assembly election). The close of nominations for the Assembly constituency was on 2 June and for the Westminster seat 14 June.

== Campaigns ==
On 27 April 2006, BBC News published allegations by Peter Law's widow that Law had believed he would be in line for a peerage should he decide not to stand in the 2005 general election. The Labour Party denied that a peerage was offered.

Welsh Secretary Peter Hain attempted to build bridges with Law's supporters by apologising for imposing an all-women shortlist and suggesting that those expelled from the Labour Party might be able to rejoin. This apology was rejected by Dai Davies, Peter Law's agent and putative successor, as coming too late and being a cynical ploy to try to win the by-elections.

== Opinion polls ==
An opinion poll was conducted by GfK NOP between 24 May and 28 May, which asked 1,000 voters in the constituency how they would vote. The results were:

=== Westminster ===
House of Commons seat poll
Party	Candidate	%
Labour	Owen Smith	47%
Blaenau Gwent People's Voice	Dai Davies	35%
Liberal Democrats	Amy Kitcher	6%
Plaid Cymru	Steffan Lewis	6%
Conservative	Margrit Williams	5%

=== Assembly ===
Welsh Assembly seat poll
Party	Candidate	%
Blaenau Gwent People's Voice	Trish Law	43%
Labour	John Hopkins	40%
Plaid Cymru	John Price	6%
Liberal Democrats	Steve Bard	6%
Conservative	Jonathan Burns	3%
Green	John Matthews	2%

== See also ==
- List of United Kingdom by-elections (1979–2010)
- Blaenau Gwent
