= Owen Smith =

British former politician (born 1970)

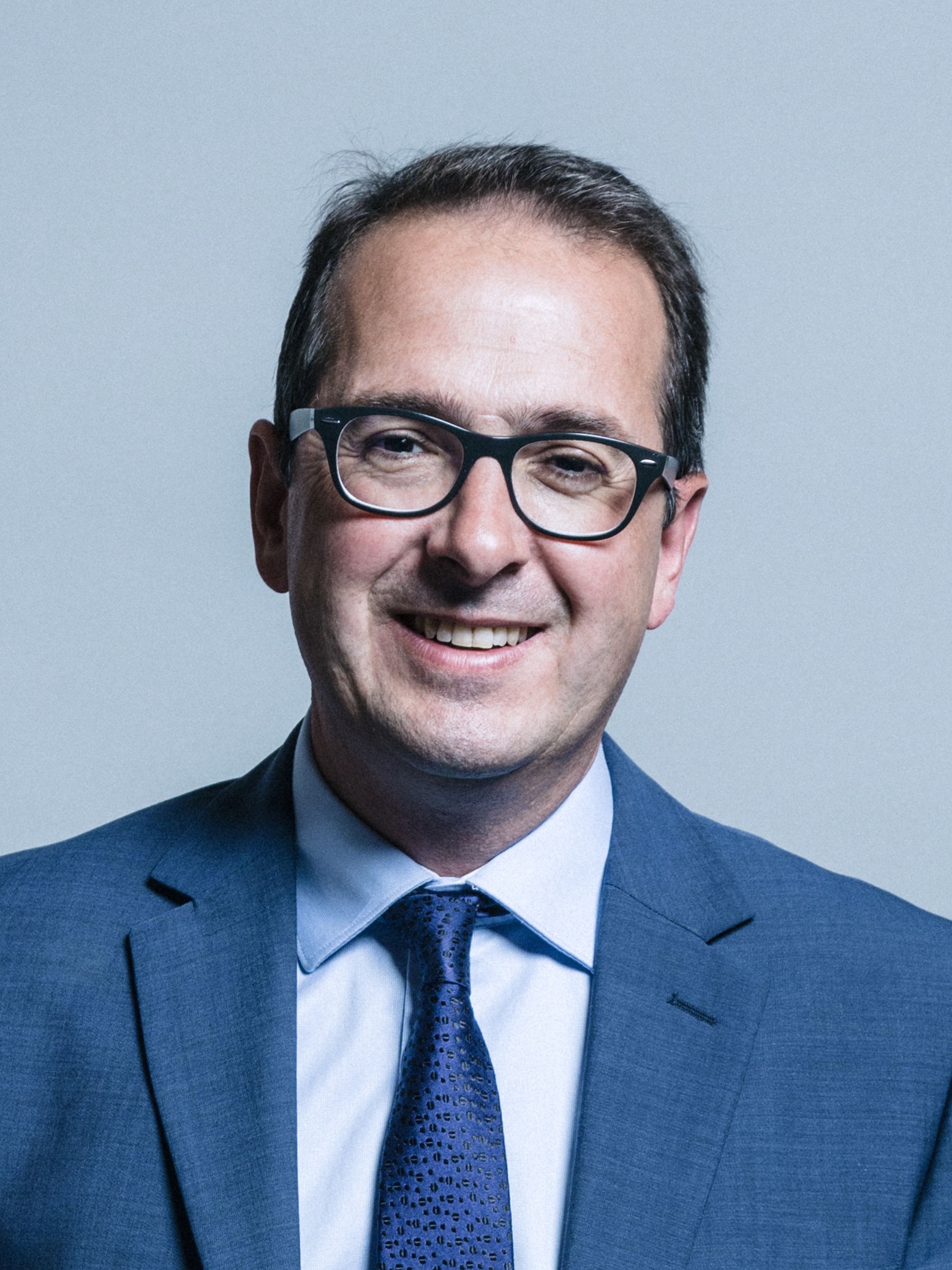
- Official portrait, 2017

Shadow Secretary of State for Northern Ireland
- In office 14 June 2017 – 23 March 2018
- Leader: Jeremy Corbyn
- Preceded by: David Anderson
- Succeeded by: Tony Lloyd

Shadow Secretary of State for Work and Pensions
- In office 14 September 2015 – 27 June 2016
- Leader: Jeremy Corbyn
- Preceded by: Stephen Timms (acting)
- Succeeded by: Debbie Abrahams

Shadow Secretary of State for Wales
- In office 15 May 2012 – 14 September 2015
- Leader: Ed Miliband; Harriet Harman
- Preceded by: Peter Hain
- Succeeded by: Nia Griffith

Shadow Minister for Wales
- In office 25 September 2010 – 15 May 2012
- Leader: Ed Miliband
- Preceded by: Wayne David
- Succeeded by: Nia Griffith

Member of Parliament for Pontypridd
- In office 6 May 2010 – 6 November 2019
- Preceded by: Kim Howells
- Succeeded by: Alex Davies-Jones

Personal details
- Born: 2 May 1970 (age 56) Morecambe, Lancashire, England
- Party: Labour
- Spouse: Elizabeth Wood (m. 1995)
- Children: 3
- Education: University of Sussex (BA)
- Website: Official website

Owen Smith (born 2 May 1970) is a British lobbyist and former politician. A member of the Labour Party, he was the Member of Parliament (MP) for Pontypridd from 2010 to 2019.

After graduating from the University of Sussex, Smith worked as a radio and television producer for the BBC for a decade, then as a special adviser for Welsh Secretary Paul Murphy, and as a political lobbyist for Pfizer and Amgen before being elected to the House of Commons. Smith went on to serve as Shadow Welsh Secretary under Ed Miliband from 2012 until 2015, and then as Shadow Work and Pensions Secretary under Jeremy Corbyn from 2015 until he resigned in June 2016.

On 13 July 2016, he contested the leadership of the Labour Party and was defeated. Following the 2017 general election, Corbyn appointed Smith as Shadow Secretary of State for Northern Ireland. Corbyn sacked him from the Labour frontbench in March 2018 after he publicly called for a referendum on the final Brexit deal, a position that was against Labour policy of the time. Smith did not stand for reelection in 2019.

In 2020, after leaving Parliament, he resumed his lobbying career when he joined pharmaceutical company Bristol Myers Squibb as their UK government relations director, eventually being promoted to vice president and General Manager of their Australia and New Zealand division in 2024.

== Early life and career ==
Smith was born in Morecambe, Lancashire, the son of the Welsh historian and writer David "Dai" Smith, a former chair of the Arts Council of Wales. He was brought up in Barry, Vale of Glamorgan, and attended Barry Comprehensive School. He joined the Labour Party aged 16, and later read History and French at the University of Sussex. He worked for the BBC as a radio producer for ten years, working on a variety of programmes in both Wales and London, including Today for BBC Radio 4 and the weekly politics programme Dragon's Eye for BBC Cymru Wales.

Smith then worked in the biotechnology and pharmaceuticals industry for five years, and became Head of Policy and Government Relations for pharmaceutical corporation Pfizer in 2005. After leaving Pfizer in September 2008, he joined Amgen, another pharmaceutical company.

== Political career ==
=== Before parliament ===
Smith became a special adviser for Paul Murphy, at the time the Secretary of State for Wales, in 2002. He later followed Murphy to the Northern Ireland Office.

In 2006, while still Head of Policy and Government Relations for Pfizer, Smith fought the 2006 Blaenau Gwent by-election. At the time he said that Pfizer had been "extremely supportive" of his aspirations to public office. He lost to independent candidate Dai Davies, polling 37% of the vote while Davies polled 46.2%. During the by-election campaign, Smith spoke with Wales Online and expressed his support for the private sector playing a supportive role in the NHS, private finance initiative (PFI) schemes, but has since described such schemes as a failure.

=== Member of Parliament ===
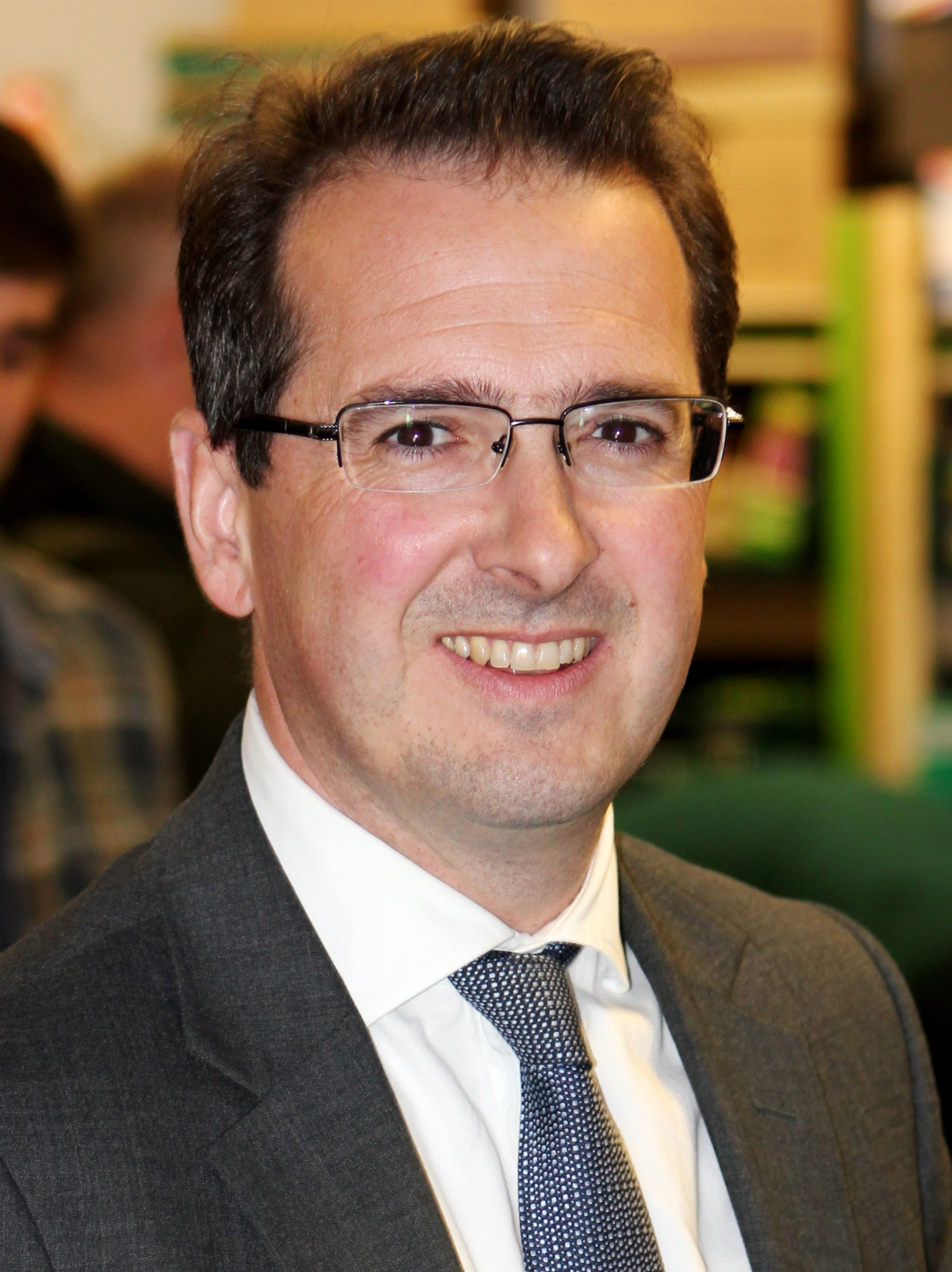
Smith in 2013

Subsequently, he was selected as the candidate for the safe Labour seat of Pontypridd and won it by a majority of 2,785 votes over the Liberal Democrat candidate at the 2010 general election, a much narrower margin than that of the previous Labour MP, Kim Howells, with the Labour majority falling by 25.7%. He then joined the Welsh Affairs Select Committee and was appointed as a Shadow minister for Wales.

In 2012, Smith was promoted to Ed Miliband's Shadow Cabinet as Shadow Secretary of State for Wales, after Peter Hain stepped down.

Smith was named as a potential contender in the 2015 Labour leadership election to replace Ed Miliband. Ultimately, nothing came of this. On 14 September 2015, he was named as the new Shadow Secretary of State for Work and Pensions, following the election of Jeremy Corbyn as Leader of the Labour Party. On 9 January 2016, Smith voiced an interest in eventually standing for the Labour leadership, saying it would be an "incredible honour and privilege" to do the job.

On 27 June 2016, following the mass resignations from the Labour Shadow Cabinet after the British electorate narrowly voted in favour of leaving the European Union in the EU membership referendum, Smith announced he was stepping down as the Shadow Secretary of State for Work and Pensions. He resigned over concerns about the leadership of Jeremy Corbyn, saying "It breaks my heart to say I cannot see how he can continue as leader."

On 29 October 2019, following a Parliamentary vote to back a 12 December general election, Smith tendered his resignation as an MP. He stated: "For political and personal reasons, I have written tonight to Jeremy Corbyn informing him of my decision not to stand at the coming General Election. It has been a great honour and a privilege to serve the people of the Pontypridd Constituency."

=== 2016 Labour leadership election ===
On 10 July 2016, Owen Smith claimed Corbyn and his allies were prepared to see the party split. He claimed on Twitter: "On July 27 I asked Jeremy Corbyn if he was prepared to see our party split & worse, wanted it to. He offered no answer". Smith also claimed "In the same meeting, in response to the same question [John McDonnell] shrugged his shoulders and said 'if that's what it takes'."

Three days later, on 13 July 2016, Smith announced his intention to stand as a candidate in the leadership ballot. He said that he supported many of Corbyn's policies but that Corbyn was "not a leader who can lead us into an election and win for Labour." He suggested that the party's MPs or NEC could choose between him and Angela Eagle, so that only one of the two would go forward to a ballot. He postponed the scheduled official launch of his campaign in Pontypridd on 15 July following the Bastille Day attack in Nice, which he described as "heartbreaking". In launching his campaign on 17 July, he called for a rewriting of Clause IV of the party's constitution to make a specific reference to tackling inequality, which he said should be "right at the heart of everything that we do".

On 18 July 2016, Angela Eagle pulled out of the leadership race because she had approximately 20 fewer nominations than Smith. In an interview, Smith offered the following endorsement of the former contender: "Angela is a star in the Labour firmament. She will be at my right hand throughout this contest and if I am successful, Angela will be alongside me as my right hand woman." He explained that his decision to run for leader was partly because the future of the Labour Party was at risk, stating that the "possibility of split is dangerously real".

On 24 September 2016, Corbyn soundly defeated Smith in the Labour leadership election, securing 61.8% of the vote to Smith's 38.2%.

=== Corbyn Shadow Cabinet ===
Following the 2017 general election, Corbyn appointed Smith as Shadow Secretary of State for Northern Ireland. After Smith announced his support for the UK to remain in the European single market and his support for a second EU referendum (a breach of shadow cabinet collective responsibility), Corbyn fired Smith from the Labour frontbench. He was replaced by Tony Lloyd, who served previously in the Blair government and as Shadow Housing Minister under Corbyn.

=== Departure from Parliament ===
Smith announced on Twitter that he had written to Corbyn about his intention to step down at the 2019 general election. He said he was standing down for "personal and political reasons", and earlier had said "I got elected on a set of values which I think Brexit is incompatible with".

After leaving Parliament, Smith became the UK government relations director for pharmaceutical company Bristol Myers Squibb.

== Political positions ==
Smith identifies as a democratic socialist. In a July 2016 interview with The Guardian he stated, "I'm someone who believes that we live in a capitalist society and that the Labour Party is about trying to achieve socialism within that ... Ameliorating the situation, not overthrowing it by revolution." In an interview with Channel 4 News, Smith specified his position as follows: "I am on the left of the Labour Party, I share many of Jeremy's values but I think I can talk about modernising those values". He has named Nye Bevan, who served as Minister of Health (1945–1951), as his political hero. He is a member of Labour Friends of Israel.

=== Economic issues ===
Smith claims he opposes austerity and has been strongly critical of Chancellor George Osborne's plan of public spending cuts. In May 2010, he apologised for an online article in which he compared the coalition government's austerity programme to domestic violence. As Shadow Work and Pensions Secretary, Smith attacked the government's welfare reforms, calling the bedroom tax "unlawful and discriminatory". He followed the party whip by abstaining on the Welfare Reform and Work bill at its second reading on 20 July 2015, after voting for an amendment that set out the party's objections to aspects of it. On 27 October, Smith followed the party whip by voting against the bill at its third reading.

In regard to tax, Smith promised to reverse cuts in Corporation Tax due to take place up until 2020 whilst reversing the cuts made to Capital Gains Tax and Inheritance Tax in the Summer Budget.

At the launch of his party leadership campaign in July 2016, he proposed that £200 million be invested to "rebuild Britain", defined by the BBC as "building new infrastructure and council housing". He also suggested that income tax rates on the highest paid should be increased, with a top rate of 50%, saying that recent party policy had been "too timid". In an interview with The Guardian in mid-July, Smith said that housing – doubling the number of homes built – would be an important part of his platform.

=== Employment ===
In late July 2016, Smith pledged that, if elected as Leader of the Labour Party, he would ban zero-hour contracts and end the salary freeze for public sector workers, stating that "the public sector pay freeze cannot continue while the costs – of housing and heating, transport and childcare – continue to rise". He said he would also reintroduce Wage Councils for hotel, shop and care workers, most of which were abolished during the 1980s and 1990s. He said about the councils that "I think there's a real case for re-inventing modern wage councils, operating sector by sector, looking at the specific terms and conditions in individual sectors and arguing for better terms and wages for workers in those sectors ... They are very powerful way in which you have an independent debate about the right wage levels and argue in that forum for better terms and conditions".

In his 2016 leadership bid, Smith released proposals for policies aimed at improving workers' rights, such as a repeal of the "Trade Unions Act" and a commitment to ensure workers' representation on remuneration committees. Smith also proposed replacing the current Department for Work and Pensions with a new 'Ministry for Labour' and a revived Department for Social Security.

=== European Union ===
Smith supported the campaign for the UK to remain in the European Union, at the referendum on Britain's membership in June 2016. After the referendum, Smith said that those who had voted to leave the EU had done so "because they felt a sense of loss in their communities, decline, cuts that have hammered away at vital public services and they haven't felt that any politicians, certainly not the politicians they expect to stand up for them, the Labour Party, has been standing up for them." His recommendation was to "put in place concrete policies that will bring real improvements to people's lives so I'm talking about a British New Deal for every part of Britain ..."

On 13 July 2016, following the vote to leave the EU, he pledged that he would press for an early general election or offer a further referendum on the final 'Brexit' deal drawn up by the new prime minister, were he to be elected Labour leader. He also said: "I don't think we should accept we're on a definite path out. I think we need to make sure people are satisfied". According to The Guardian, Smith was in favour of a second referendum on "whatever Brexit deal May's team negotiates with the other 27 EU member states", although a BBC report describes his position as "Would be 'tempted' to call a second EU referendum."

Smith stated in November 2016 that he would vote against the invocation of Article 50 to commence Brexit negotiations, and reaffirmed he supported a second referendum on British withdrawal from the EU. In the series of Parliamentary votes on Brexit in March 2019, Smith voted against the Labour Party whip and in favour of an amendment tabled by members of The Independent Group for a second public vote.

=== NHS ===
During a speech in South Yorkshire in July 2016, he said he wanted to create a tax on the richest 1% in society, which would be at a rate of 15% on unearned income for earners over £150,000 a year, which would help to fund the NHS. He said that this would raise £3 billion for the health service. He then went on to say that he would give the NHS an extra 4% funding per year.

=== Nuclear defence ===
When interviewed on the Today programme in July 2016, Smith revealed that he used to be a member of the Campaign for Nuclear Disarmament and "fundamentally wants the world to be without nuclear bombs." He has described himself as being a "sceptic" of the Trident nuclear programme and as favouring a multilateralist approach to nuclear disarmament (a position he noted as being Bevanite). In 2016, he stated that he would vote to renew Trident, saying: "I want a world without nuclear weapons altogether, but I don't think we hasten that by divesting." Smith did vote in favour of the government's Trident renewal programme motion on 18 July 2016, as did another 139 Labour MPs, in line with long-standing party policy on at-sea nuclear deterrent.

=== Military interventions ===
In 2006, Smith said while discussing the Iraq War that "I thought at the time the tradition of the Labour Party and the tradition of left-wing engagement to remove dictators was a noble, valuable tradition". However, later during the same by-election campaign, in an interview with The Daily Telegraph, Smith argued that the invasion of Iraq was a mistake and "the world would have been a safer place if we hadn't done it."

He was amongst the 557 MPs who voted in favour of the UN-backed air strikes on Libya in 2011.

In December 2015, Smith sided with the Labour leadership by opposing the government's plans for military intervention in the Syrian civil war. He called for lessons to be learned from past intervention in the Middle East and a more diplomatic approach to be pursued instead.

== Personal life ==
He is married to Liz, who is a primary school teacher, and moved to Llantrisant after being elected in 2010, having previously lived in Surrey. They have three children. In 2023 after his promotion with Bristol Myers Squibb, Smith and his family relocated to Melbourne, Australia.

Parliament of the United Kingdom
Preceded by Kim Howells	Member of Parliament for Pontypridd; 2010–2019	Succeeded by Alex Davies-Jones
Political offices
Preceded by Peter Hain	Shadow Secretary of State for Wales; 2012–2015	Succeeded by Nia Griffith
Preceded by Stephen Timms; Acting	Shadow Secretary of State for Work and Pensions; 2015–2016	Succeeded by Debbie Abrahams
Preceded by David Anderson	Shadow Secretary of State for Northern Ireland; 2017–2018	Succeeded by Tony Lloyd
