= Lake Torrent =

Proposed race track in Coalisland, Northern Ireland

Lake Torrent Motorsport Centre
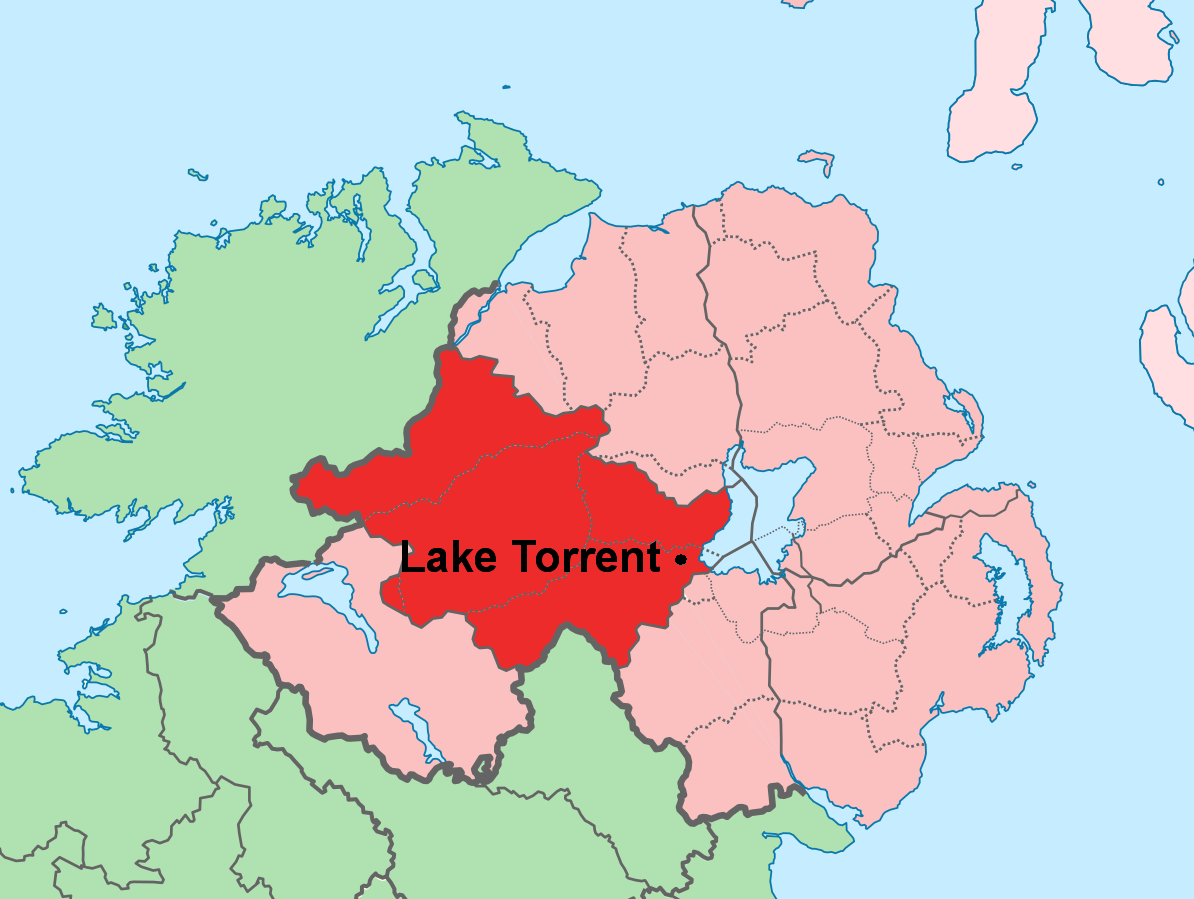
- Position of race circuit within County Tyrone shown in context of Northern Ireland
- Location: Coalisland, County Tyrone, Northern Ireland
- Coordinates: 54°32′09.5″N 6°42′25.5″W
- Owner: Manna Developments Ltd
- Broke ground: 20 September 2017
- Architect: Graham6 Architecture and Engineering
- Major events: World SBK (proposed)
- Website: laketorrent.com
- Length: 3.6 km (2.2 miles)
- Turns: 12

Lake Torrent Motorsport Centre is a failed project to create a new, purpose-built racing circuit for motorsports located in Coalisland, County Tyrone, Northern Ireland. The name is shared with the nearby Torrent River.

Under development from September 2017, the project made little progress and was placed into administration in late 2018, with the site available to purchase from receivers as a commercial development opportunity in 2019. The project's failure was in part blamed on the below-ground works needed to fill and stabilise many historic mine working excavations.

The anticipated completion date for phase-one involving the circuit and infrastructure buildings was 2019. The 163 acres (66 ha) site is situated on disused clay pits, previously providing raw materials for brick production, in an area traditionally known for coal mining. Initial groundworks were formally opened in September 2017, attended by Francie Molloy, MP for Mid-Ulster, unlike the continually stalled Circuit of Wales which has seen no actual development.

== Development ==
The circuit's 2.2 mile (3.6) km design by contracted-consultants Driven International incorporates the existing undulating land-contours having a 24-metre elevation range mixed with 12 turns, allowing for three layouts, and will comply with FIA Grade 2 / FIM Grade B requirements, to include all car and motorcycle sport classes excepting F1 cars.

It is envisaged that there will be approximately four race meetings per year for both motorcycle and cars, and that otherwise it could be used for vehicle development and corporate/training track days.

Triple world superbike champion Johnny Rea commented in October 2017 that it would be a good facility for the development of future Irish circuit-race competitors, but had reservations about mixed-use where the circuit might be used for both car and motorcycle events, as each had different criteria within their respective design considerations. Rea's fellow Northern Irish World Superbike competitor Eugene Laverty in February 2018 expressed his delight concerning the prospect of world-level racing coming his homeland.

Planning consent granted by Mid-Ulster District Council also covers a proposed second-phase, including a hotel, retail and business units together with a range of community and leisure facilities. The development is to be financed privately.

In February 2018, David Henderson, principal of Manna Developments announced the signing at Mid Ulster District Council offices in Dungannon of a three-year contract with Daniel Carrera, executive director of Dorna WSBK, to host World Superbike rounds starting from 2019. The project construction was expected to take 18 months and cost £30M.

== Development delays, administration and sale ==
When questioned about seemingly little activity on the site in June 2018, a year before the intended first race, Henderson commented that there had been unforeseen works below ground concerning over 70 mine shafts and that much topsoil had to be imported to cover the entire area, which were not unusual circumstances when converting a previous industrial site.

Race organisers Dorna were reported to have approached the owners of Donington Park in June 2018 as a contingency to host the 2019 races. The 2019 provisional WSBK calendar showed the UK round arranged for 5–7 July, without firm venue details, but showing spectator support services as at Donington Park.

In late 2018, the development went into financial administration with Manna head David Henderson still expecting to complete if planning-consent difficulties, stated to have been exacerbated by Mid Ulster District Council, could eventually be overcome.

However, in April 2019 the Keenan CF administrators announced that the site was available, and had appointed the commercial property firm O’Connor Kennedy Turtle to handle the sale. Later in 2019 the Lake Torrent property site has been taken off the agency's listings, but no news about sale have been made public. The current Lake Torrent website is currently “undergoing maintenance”.

== Existing race tracks ==
There are two existing non-road based race tracks in NI, both based on former airfields, at Bishopscourt and Kirkistown.

== See also ==
- Mondello Park
- Circuit of Wales
