= Lesley Cowley =

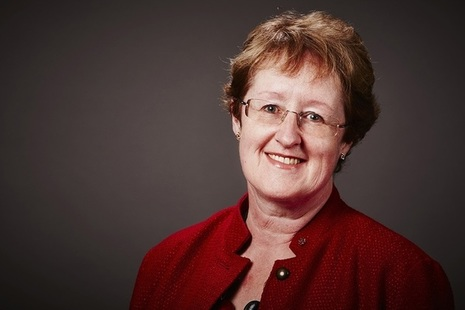
Lesley Cowley, OBE

Lesley Ruth Cowley OBE is a British businesswoman, chairwoman and non-executive director who is currently serving as Chair of Building Digital UK. She is best known as the former CEO of .uk domain name registry Nominet UK. She is also the current chair of the Driver and Vehicle Licensing Agency (DVLA) and Companies House and the consultancy Public Digital.

== Career ==
Lesley Cowley (2012)

In 1990, Cowley joined New College, Swindon, where she became director of corporate services.

Cowley joined Nominet as operations director in 1999 before being made managing director in 2002 and CEO in 2004, serving in that position for 10 years. She led the organisation through a period of significant change, during which it grew from 400,000 .uk registrations and 28 staff to 10.5m registrations and 200 staff. In addition, she played a leading role in the establishment of the Nominet Trust charity, the UK's leading social tech funder. Cowley announced her departure from Nominet in May 2014, and left the company in July.

Cowley was appointed as the first non-executive chair of the DVLA in October 2014, and reappointed in October 2016. She was appointed lead non-executive director of The National Archives in January 2016, and non-executive chair of Companies House in June 2017.

Since October 2014, Cowley has served as the non-executive director of telecoms operator aql.

She previously served as ICANN ccNSO chair and as a member of the UK Government Cyber Crime Reduction Partnership.

Cowley is a founder of DNS Women, a global networking and support group for women working in the domain name system sector.

== Education ==
During her time working at New College, Swindon, the college offered Cowley the opportunity to go to university - having not previously gone - and she became a student at the University of the West of England, Bristol, studying part-time for a Master of Business Administration (MBA). She graduated with distinction in 1997.

She was awarded the honorary degree of Doctor of Technology by UWE Bristol in 2015 in recognition of her achievement and influence in the field of technology and her contribution to STEM and STEM ambassadors in schools.

== Honours and awards ==
Cowley was made an OBE for services to the internet and e-commerce in 2011.

Computer Weekly named Cowley as one of the top five most influential women in IT in both 2012 and 2013. The following year she was awarded the inaugural ICANN Leadership Award.

In 2014, Cowley was named by the Sunday Times as one of the 500 most influential people in the UK.

Cowley is a Fellow of the Institute of Directors, Institute of Credit Management, the British Computer Society and the Royal Society of Arts.

== Personal life ==
Cowley was born and raised in Bristol and left school at 17, initially working in sales and credit management.
