= Alun Davies (politician) =

Welsh politician (born 1964)

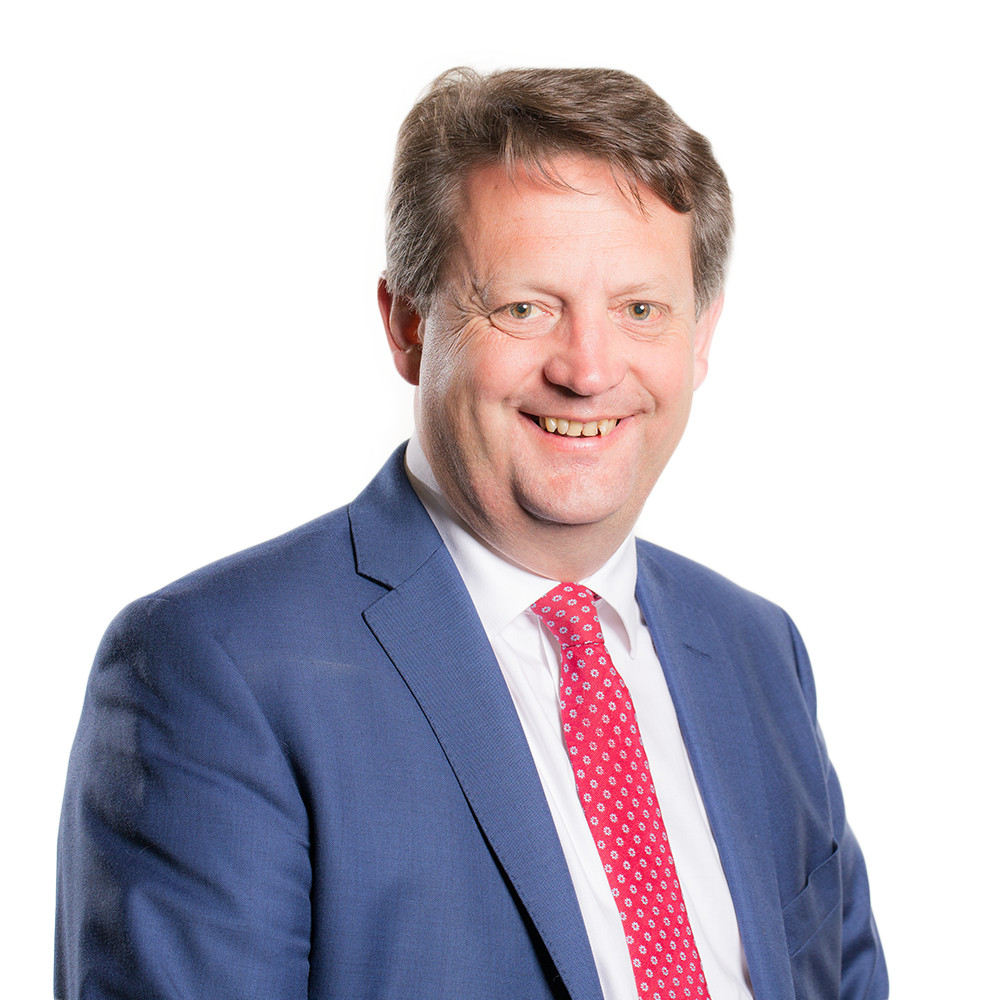
- Davies in 2016

Cabinet Secretary for Local Government and Public Services
- In office 3 November 2017 – 13 December 2018
- First Minister: Carwyn Jones
- Preceded by: Carl Sargeant (Communities and Children)
- Succeeded by: Julie James (Minister for Housing and Local Government)

Minister for Lifelong Learning and Welsh Language
- In office 19 May 2016 – 3 November 2017
- First Minister: Carwyn Jones
- Preceded by: Office established
- Succeeded by: The Baroness Morgan of Ely

Minister for Natural Resources and Food
- In office 14 March 2013 – 8 July 2014
- First Minister: Carwyn Jones
- Preceded by: John Griffiths (Environment and Sustainable Development); Himself (Deputy Minister for Agriculture)
- Succeeded by: Rebecca Evans (Deputy Minister for Agriculture and Fisheries)

Deputy Minister for Agriculture
- In office 13 May 2011 – 14 March 2013
- First Minister: Carwyn Jones
- Preceded by: Office established
- Succeeded by: Himself (Minister for Natural Resources and Food)

Member of the Senedd (Note: Stylized as "Member of the Welsh Assembly" from 2007 to 2011)
- In office 5 May 2011 – 7 April 2026
- Preceded by: Trish Law
- Succeeded by: Constituency abolished
- Constituency: Blaenau Gwent
- In office 3 May 2007 – 5 May 2011
- Preceded by: Glyn Davies
- Succeeded by: Rebecca Evans
- Constituency: Mid and West Wales

Personal details
- Born: 12 February 1964 (age 62) Tredegar, Monmouthshire, Wales
- Party: Welsh Labour & Co-operative (since 2002)
- Other political affiliations: Plaid Cymru (1990–2002)
- Education: University of Wales, Aberystwyth
- Occupation: Politician, public affairs consultant and businessperson
- Website: Welsh Labour

Thomas Alun Rhys Davies (born 12 February 1964) is a Welsh Labour and Co-operative party politician who served as the Member of the Senedd (MS) from 2007 to 2026, first for Mid and West Wales and then for Blaenau Gwent from 2011. He served in several Welsh government offices, including Cabinet Secretary for Local Government and Public Services, Minister for Lifelong Learning and Welsh Language, and Minister for Natural Resources and Food.

Davies previously worked as a public affairs consultant, and began his political career in Plaid Cymru before joining Welsh Labour. He was sacked from his Cabinet role in 2014 for pressuring civil servants to reveal private information about opposition Members, shortly after facing calls to resign after an investigation determined he had breached the Ministerial Code on a separate issue.

== Background ==
Davies was born in Tredegar and went to Tredegar Comprehensive School followed by the University College of Wales, Aberystwyth where he graduated with a BSc (Econ) degree in International Politics in 1986. He was involved in student politics at the time and was elected President of the National Union of Students Wales. He first worked as a campaigner on environmental issues for the World Wide Fund for Nature, and later as a poverty campaigner for Oxfam during which time he visited Rwanda and the former Yugoslavia.

== Professional career ==
Davies worked as public and corporate affairs manager for Hyder, which combined Wales' main utilities, and Davies specialised in its capital investment programme. He subsequently transferred to be Head of Public Affairs at the United Kingdom Atomic Energy Authority, and later became Director of Corporate Affairs for Welsh language television station S4C. In 2004 he started Bute Communications, his own public affairs consultancy.

== Political career ==
Davies was initially a member of Plaid Cymru. He stood as a Plaid Cymru-Green candidate for the Blaenau Gwent parliamentary seat in 1992. He also stood for Plaid Cymru in 1997 in the Cynon Valley.

After taking some years out of politics to pursue his professional career he was selected as Labour's candidate in Ceredigion at the 2005 general election.

=== Senedd ===
He was chosen as first on the Labour Party list for 'top-up' seats from the Mid and West Wales region for the 2007 Assembly election, and because of Labour losses in the region the party secured two seats. Since being elected to the Assembly he was awarded the BBC Wales' AM:PM award for "Newcomer of the Year" and has chaired the Broadcasting Committee and the Rural Development Sub-Committee.

In July 2009 he was selected to fight his home seat of Blaenau Gwent at the next Assembly elections; he won the seat with a majority of 9,120 over the Independent candidate.

On 13 May 2011 Davies was appointed Deputy Minister for Agriculture, Food, Fisheries and European Programmes in the Welsh Government.

On 14 March 2013 he was appointed Minister for Natural Resources and Food in the Welsh Government. Davies was however removed in July 2014 by First Minister Carwyn Jones from the Cabinet for "unacceptable behaviour" involving requests for information about farm subsidies paid to opposition AMs including Plaid Cymru AM Llyr Gruffydd and Conservative Antoinette Sandbach.

In May 2016 he was re-elected as the Assembly Member for Blaenau Gwent and was re-appointed to the Welsh Government as Minister for Lifelong Learning and the Welsh Language where he was responsible for the new Welsh language strategy to create a million Welsh speakers and reforming the education framework for learners with additional learning needs.

After a BBC Newsnight report on the Welsh language, Davies publicly released a rebuttal as Minister for the Welsh Language in August 2017, stating the broadcaster had presented the issue as if "the Welsh language had to justify its own existence". He questioned the decision to not bring on a Welsh speaker to talk about the language as part of the broadcast, and accused the London broadcaster of treating Wales "like a nation far away about whom Newsnight knows little".

On 3 November 2017, Davies was appointed Cabinet Secretary for Local Government and Public Services. He again left the cabinet in December 2018 after a re-shuffle by incoming First Minister Mark Drakeford.

On 10 August 2018, Davies became the fifth Welsh Assembly Member (AM) to declare an interest in standing to be the next Welsh Labour Leader and next First Minister. He withdrew on 18 September 2018 after failing to secure any nominations and instead endorsed Eluned Morgan.

In January 2022, Davies called for those who are unvaccinated against COVID-19 to be banned from using public transport, coffee shops and gyms.

Davies was an unsuccessful candidate for the Blaenau Gwent Caerffili Rhymni in the 2026 Senedd election.

== Controversies ==
In 2005, while Labour's candidate for Ceredigion, he clashed with Welsh actor Rhys Ifans at a Cardiff hotel over support for the Iraq War. The police were called, no charges were brought and Davies subsequently apologised.

After becoming an AM in 2007, he was criticised for claiming back the mortgage interest payments for a home he bought in Cardiff five years before he became an AM.

In the Spring of 2014 he confessed to entering into a relationship with his own special advisor, Anna McMorrin, and confirmed that both had left their long-term partners as a result. McMorrin was moved from her role.

On 10 June 2014, the First Minister announced an investigation into a letter Davies wrote to Natural Resources Wales (NRW) regarding environmental concerns with the proposed development of the Circuit of Wales race track in his own constituency. As well as making up part of his ministerial portfolio, NRW had expressed concerns about the race tracks development. In an investigation undertaken by Permanent Secretary Derek Jones, his report published on 1 July 2014 concluded that Davies had breached the Ministerial Code. The report noted that in March 2013, Davies had been advised by his own department not to lobby even as the AM in the case of the race track, but had ignored this advice and had then written to NRW as the affected AM. The report also revealed that the First Minister had contacted Davies in August 2013, after Davies had expressed support for the circuit openly in quote to the Western Mail newspaper. Davies faced no punishment by the First Minister, but endured sustained calls for him to resign due to his behaviour.

On 8 July 2014 he was sacked by First Minister Carwyn Jones following his repeated written requests to his civil servants for the private details of Common Agricultural Policy payments made to opposition members, including: Andrew RT Davies (Leader, Welsh Conservatives); Antoinette Sandbach (Conservative); Kirsty Williams (Leader, Welsh Liberal Democrats); William Powell (Welsh Liberal Democrats); and Llyr Gruffydd (Plaid Cymru).

In October 2018 he was criticised for comparing councils who asked for extra funding to Oliver Twist.

He was suspended from the Welsh Labour group in the Senedd on 19 January 2021 after allegedly drinking alcohol on Senedd premises while a ban on alcohol sales was in force throughout Wales. The incident happened on 8 December 2020 when Alun Davies met with conservative members Paul Davies, Darren Millar and Nick Ramsay over alcohol in a Tŷ Hywel tearoom to seek their support on his Bill, Welsh Hearts Bill. The Senedd Commission said it was investigating the incident which "may have been contrary to public health regulations". Welsh Government brought in COVID-19 regulations on 4 December 2020, banning the sale of alcohol in licensed premises. At the time of the suspension Alun Davies said he was sorry that the incident gave the impression that he was not upholding the regulations, adding that "The Senedd Commission has already confirmed to me that I did not breach the coronavirus regulations on the consumption of either food or alcohol that were in force at that time."

Alun Davies was re-admitted to the Welsh Labour group in the Senedd on the 23 February 2021, he also continued to stand in the 2021 Senedd election for his constituency. He was reelected.

== Offices held ==
Senedd
Preceded by Glyn Davies	Member of the Welsh Assembly for Mid and West Wales; 2007–2011	Succeeded by Rebecca Evans
Preceded by Trish Law	Member of the Senedd for Blaenau Gwent; 2011–2026	Succeeded by Constituency abolished
Political offices
New post	Deputy Minister for Agriculture, Food, Fisheries & European Programmes; 2011–2014	Succeeded by Rebecca Evans
New post	Minister for Natural Resources and Food; 2013–2014	Post abolished
New post	Minister for Lifelong Learning and Welsh Language; 2016–2017	Post abolished
Preceded by Carl Sargeant	Cabinet Secretary for Housing and Local Government; 2017–2018	Succeeded by Julie James
