= Llew Smith =

British Labour party MP and MEP (1944–2021)

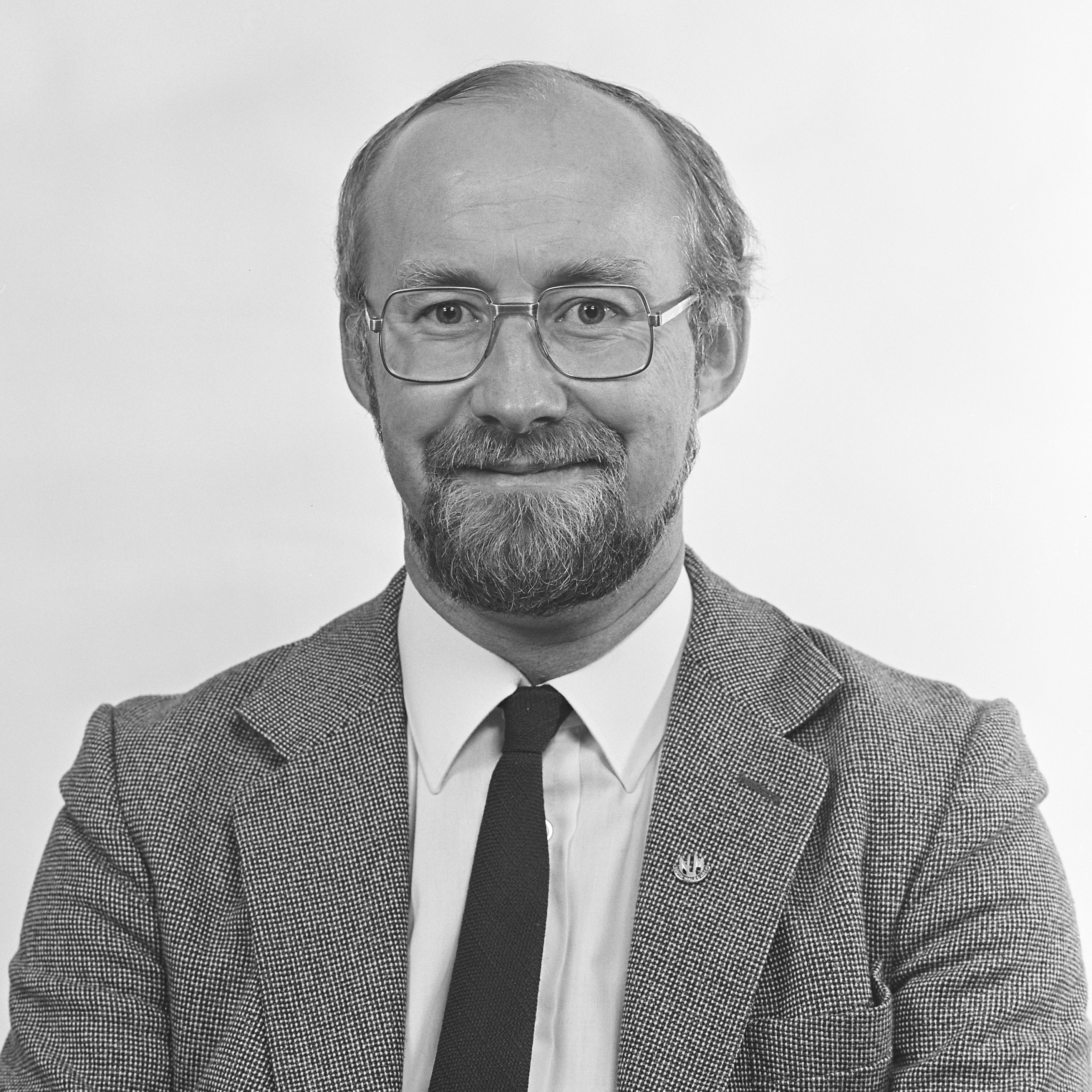
- Official MEP portrait

Member of Parliament for Blaenau Gwent
- In office 9 April 1992 – 11 April 2005
- Preceded by: Michael Foot
- Succeeded by: Peter Law

Member of the European Parliament for South Wales East
- In office 17 June 1984 – 9 June 1994
- Preceded by: Constituency established
- Succeeded by: Glenys Kinnock

Personal details
- Born: Llewellyn Thomas Smith; 16 April 1944 Newbridge, Wales
- Died: 26 May 2021 (aged 77)
- Party: Labour
- Spouse: Pam Smith (died 2008)
- Children: Two sons, one daughter

Llewellyn Thomas Smith (16 April 1944 – 26 May 2021) was a British Labour Party politician.

== Early life and education ==
According to Smith, his father was born in England and moved to Wales as a child. He began working at the local colliery (Newbridge) at the age of thirteen, and his brother died in a tragic accident while also working there. Smith's father eventually died of cancer and pneumoconiosis, a group of diseases typically associated with mineworkers.

Smith was educated at Coleg Harlech as an adult, referring to himself as a "second chance" student. Before becoming a politician, he worked as a labourer and computer operator.

== Political career ==
Smith was Member of the European Parliament (MEP) for South Wales East from 1984 to 1994, being re-elected in the 1989 European election. While in this position, he worked with members like Alex Falconer, Stan Newens, and Alf Lomas to improve the democratic accountability of the parliament.

At the 1992 general election he was elected as Member of Parliament (MP) for Blaenau Gwent, succeeding former Labour leader Michael Foot. He was a member of the Socialist Campaign Group, and defied various government whips. He opposed the private finance initiative, the creation of nuclear weapons, and Tony Blair's stance on the Iraq War.

Smith became known for his opposition to devolution and the formation of the National Assembly for Wales; in May 1997, Welsh Secretary Ron Davies threatened disciplinary action against Welsh Labour MPs who planned to campaign against a Welsh Assembly in the devolution referendum. Smith was a specific focus of this move, having various party meetings about his views and being threatened by Davies and his policy adviser with expulsion if he chose to act on them. A public row ensued in which Davies was pushed to say that those who reasonably opposed devolution, including Smith, would not be removed from the party. After this, Smith stepped back from his complaint to the standards and privileges committee, but did not withdraw it. Following the creation of the Assembly, he continued to vote against giving it further powers and funding, and led a campaign to change its voting from a proportional list system.

In the 2001 general election, Smith won Blaenau Gwent with 61% of the vote, beating the Plaid Cymru candidate by 19,313 votes. In 2002, he was one of several MPs to express support for the Labour Against the Euro group, which opposed the UK's possible membership of the single currency.

In December 2002, Smith made an early announcement that he would be standing down as an MP, so a suitable candidate could be found for the next general election. Later, the Blairite Maggie Jones was chosen to succeed him in an all-woman shortlist. Smith opposed this move as it took the choice of representation out of the hands of constituents, and instead suggested that Assembly Member Peter Law would win in the 2005 general election should he go against Jones, calling him a "popular and effective representative". This prediction came true when Law stood as an Independent, becoming the MP for Blaenau Gwent for the year up until his death. Twenty party members were expelled for openly supporting Law, but Smith remained within the party due to not openly voicing any support.

Following Law's death from a brain tumour in 2006, the seat was won by Dai Davies, who had previously been Smith's agent.

== Other work ==
In 2010, an exhibition was put on by Smith and his late wife at Manchester's People's History Museum, entitled Politics, Protest and the Christmas Card. It told the history of left-wing politics through the medium of the Christmas card. Following this, in 2012 he published Glad Tidings of Struggle and Strife with his wife as co-author, showing a selection of the cards.

== Personal life ==
Smith and his wife Pam (who died in 2008) had two sons, Matthew and Benjamin, and a daughter, Eleanor.

He died from cancer on 26 May 2021 at the age of 77.

European Parliament
New constituency	Member of European Parliament for South Wales East; 1984–1994	Succeeded by Glenys Kinnock
Parliament of the United Kingdom
Preceded by Michael Foot	Member of Parliament for Blaenau Gwent; 1992–2005	Succeeded by Peter Law
