= Dragon's Eye (TV programme) =

BBC Cymru Wales television programme

Dragon's Eye was a long-established BBC Cymru Wales weekly television programme, covering news and analysis of politics in Wales. It was broadcast between 2000 and 2012.

Initially, it was produced by Owen Smith, later a Labour MP. Smith said at the time: "Politics is about drama and dark deeds, plottings and sackings, leaks, eavesdropping, lies and lives. The political landscape of Wales has changed dramatically and Dragon's Eye will attempt to plot the new political map of Wales to determine where Wales now sits in the wider world of Westminster and beyond." In 2006/07, the programme had an average audience of 79,000.

It was last broadcast in 2012, and was replaced by independently produced programmes.
