= Blaenau Gwent (Senedd constituency) =

Senedd constituency (1999–2026)

Coordinates: 51.777°N 3.195°W

- Former Senedd county constituency for the Senedd
- Blaenau Gwent shown as one of the 40; Senedd constituencies

Former Senedd county constituency
- Created: 1999
- Abolished: 2026
- Party: Welsh Labour
- Member of the Senedd: Alun Davies
- Electoral region: South Wales East

Blaenau Gwent was a constituency of the Senedd. It elected one Member of the Senedd by the first past the post method of election. Also, however, it was one of eight constituencies in the South Wales East electoral region, which elected four additional members, in addition to eight constituency members, to produce a degree of proportional representation for the region as a whole.

== Boundaries ==
Map of 1999–2026 boundaries

The constituency was created for the first election to the Assembly, in 1999, with the name and boundaries of the Blaenau Gwent Westminster constituency prior to the 2023 review of Westminster constituencies.

The other seven constituencies of the South Wales East electoral region were Caerphilly, Islwyn, Merthyr Tydfil and Rhymney, Monmouth, Newport East, Newport West and Torfaen.

== History ==
This seat had had large changes in percentages and swing. Labour have had large majorities but following the By-election in 2006 Blaenau Gwent People's Voice gained the seat, with the previous incumbent Peter Law's wife Trish Law taking the seat and holding it in the 2007 National Assembly for Wales election. The party did not stand in the 2011 election and Labour regained the seat with a very large majority. However, in the 2016 election this was slashed with Plaid Cymru increasing their vote from 5.4% to 36.6%. Blaenau Gwent People's Voice won the seat in the 2006 by-election and the 2007 election.

== Voting ==
In general elections for the Senedd, each voter had two votes. The first vote was used to vote for a candidate to become the Member of the Senedd for the voter's constituency, elected by the first past the post system. The second vote was used to vote for a regional closed party list of candidates. Additional member seats were allocated from the lists by the d'Hondt method, with constituency results being taken into account in the allocation.

== Assembly members and Members of the Senedd ==
Election	Member	Party
1999	Peter Law	Welsh Labour and Co-operative
2005	Peter Law	Independent
2006 by-election	Trish Law	Blaenau Gwent People's Voice
2011	Alun Davies	Welsh Labour and Co-operative

== Elections ==
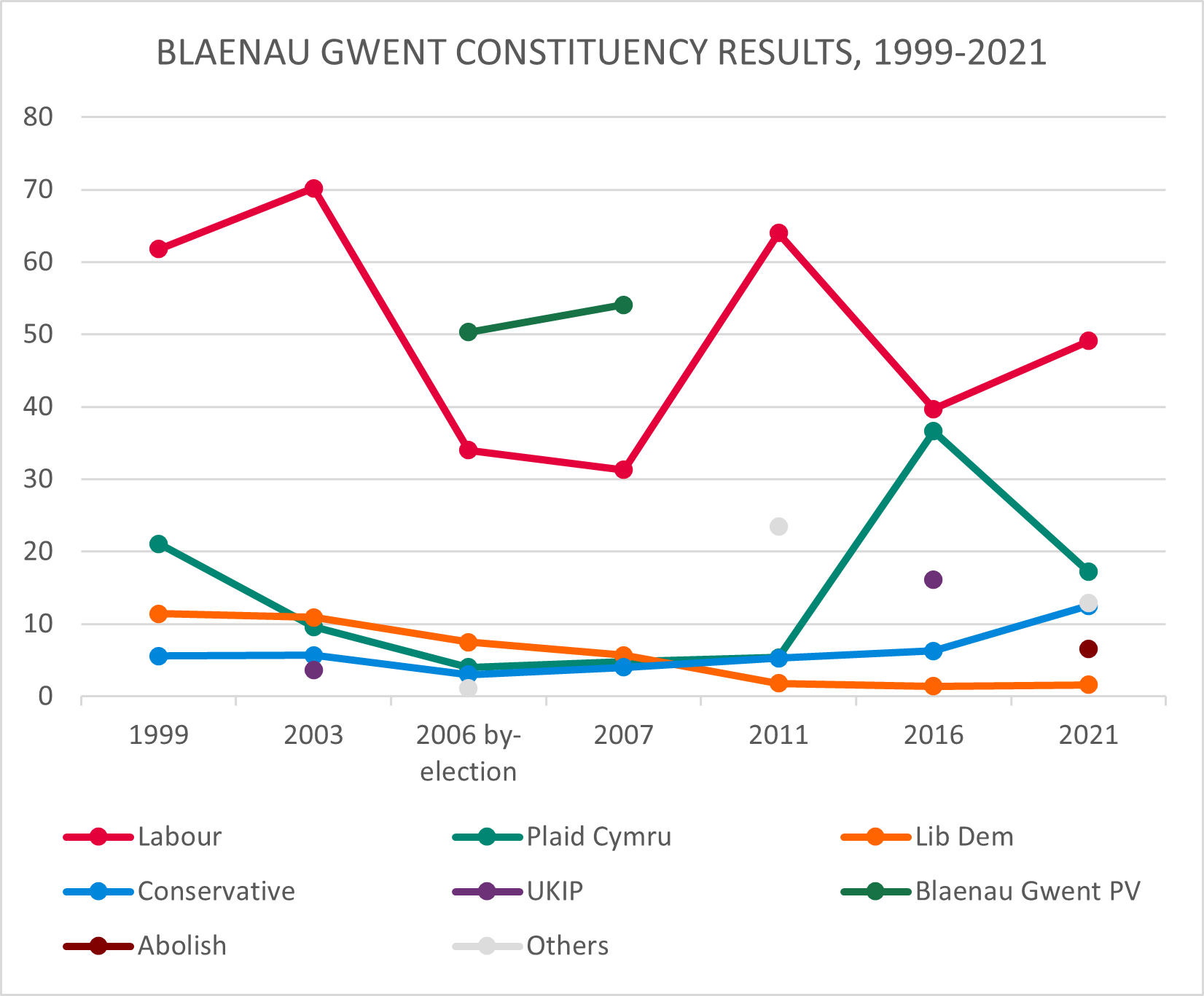
Election results since 1999 (parties who never got >5% counted as others)

=== Elections in the 2020s ===
2021 Senedd election: Blaenau Gwent
Party	Candidate	Constituency			Regional		
Party	Candidate	Votes	%	±%	Votes	%	±%
Labour	Alun Davies (Note: Incumbent member for this constituency)	10,226	49.1	+9.4	9,983	48.2	+9.4
Plaid Cymru	Peredur Owen Griffiths	3,588	17.2	-19.4	3,849	18.6	-12.9
Conservative	Edward Dawson	2,611	12.5	+6.2	2,905	14.0	+8.6
Independent	Mandy Moore	2,376	11.4	New			
Abolish	Richard Taylor	1,364	6.6	New	1,457	7.0	+3.2
Liberal Democrats	Paula Yates	333	1.6	+0.2	419	2.0	+0.5
Reform	Robert Beavis	319	1.5	New	277	1.3	New
Green					653	3.2	+1.6
UKIP					480	2.3	-13.5
Gwlad					282	1.4	New
No More Lockdowns					181	0.9	New
Propel					118	0.6	New
Communist					75	0.4	+0.2
TUSC					44	0.2	-0.2
Majority		6,638	31.9	+28.8			
Turnout		20,817	40.31	−1.8			
Labour hold		Swing					
Notes

Regional Ballot void votes: 165. Want of an Official Mark (0), Voting for more than ONE party or individual candidate (50), Writing or mark by which the Voter could be identified (0), Unmarked or Void for uncertainty (115)

=== Elections in the 2010s ===
Welsh Assembly Election 2016: Blaenau Gwent
Party	Candidate	Constituency			Regional		
Party	Candidate	Votes	%	±%	Votes	%	±%
Labour Co-op	Alun Davies	8,442	39.7	-24.3	8,260	38.8	-23.9
Plaid Cymru	Nigel Copner	7,792	36.6	+31.2	6,716	31.5	+22.2
UKIP	Kevin Boucher	3,423	16.1	New	3,373	15.8	+10.8
Conservative	Tracey West	1,334	6.3	+1.0	1,158	5.4	-1.6
Liberal Democrats	Brendan D'Cruz	300	1.4	-0.4	328	1.5	-1.7
Abolish					820	3.8	New
Green					344	1.6	-0.6
Monster Raving Loony					104	0.5	New
TUSC					81	0.4	New
National Front					64	0.3	New
Communist					51	0.2	-0.1
Majority		650	3.1	−42.0			
Turnout		21,291	42.1	+3.3			
Labour Co-op hold		Swing	-28.0				

Welsh Assembly Election 2011:Blaenau Gwent
Party	Candidate	Constituency			Regional		
Party	Candidate	Votes	%	±%	Votes	%	±%
Labour Co-op	Alun Davies	12,926	64.0	+32.7	12,567	62.7	+18.9
Independent	Jayne Sullivan	3,806	18.8	New			
Plaid Cymru	Darren Jones	1,098	5.4	+0.6	1,869	9.3	-4.0
Conservative	Bob Hayward	1,066	5.3	+1.2	1,404	7.0	+0.2
BNP	Brian Urch	948	4.7	New	980	4.9	-0.8
Liberal Democrats	Martin Blakebrough	367	1.8	-3.9	641	3.2	-5.2
UKIP					1,009	5.0	-1.3
Socialist Labour					683	3.4	+0.8
Green					440	2.2	-0.1
Welsh Christian					292	1.5	-0.9
English Democrat					89	0.4	New
Communist					58	0.3	±0.0
Majority		9,120	45.1	N/A			
Turnout		20,211	37.8	−6.7			
Labour Co-op gain from Blaenau Gwent PV		Swing					

Regional ballots rejected at the count: 171

=== Elections in the 2000s ===
Welsh Assembly Election 2007: Blaenau Gwent
Party	Candidate	Constituency			Regional		
Party	Candidate	Votes	%	±%	Votes	%	±%
Blaenau Gwent PV	Trish Law	12,722	54.1	N/A			
Labour	Keren Bender	7,365	31.3	-38.9	10,141	43.8	-17.1
Liberal Democrats	Gareth Lewis	1,351	5.7	-5.2	1,933	8.4	-2.2
Plaid Cymru	Natasha Asghar	1,129	4.8	-4.8	3,080	13.3	+2.0
Conservative	Bob Hayward	951	4.0	-1.7	1,584	6.8	+0.3
Independent - Colin Hobbs					1,680	7.3	New
UKIP					1,462	6.3	+3.4
BNP					1,313	5.7	+3.8
Socialist Labour					608	2.6	+0.2
Welsh Christian Party					590	2.6	New
Green					526	2.3	-0.1
English Democrat					79	0.3	New
Communist					77	0.3	New
CPA					54	0.2	New
Majority		5,357	22.8	N/A			
Turnout		23,518	44.5	+6.7			
Blaenau Gwent PV gain from Labour Co-op		Swing	+46.5				

By-election 2006: Blaenau Gwent
Party	Candidate	Votes	%	±%
Blaenau Gwent PV	Trish Law	13,785	50.3	New
Labour	John Hopkins	9,321	34.0	−36.2
Liberal Democrats	Stephen Bard	2,054	7.5	−3.4
Plaid Cymru	John Price	1,109	4.0	−5.6
Conservative	Jonathan Burns	816	3.0	−2.7
Green	John Matthews	302	1.1	New
Majority		4,464	16.3	N/A
Turnout		27,387	49.6	+12.2
Blaenau Gwent PV gain from Labour Co-op		Swing	+43.3	

Welsh Assembly Election 2003: Blaenau Gwent
Party	Candidate	Constituency			Regional		
Party	Candidate	Votes	%	±%	Votes	%	±%
Labour Co-op	Peter Law (Note: Incumbent member for this constituency)	13,884	70.2	+8.4	12,003	60.9	+8.4
Liberal Democrats	Stephen Bard	2,184	10.9	-0.5	2,087	10.6	-0.6
Plaid Cymru	Rhys Ab Ellis	1,889	9.6	-11.5	2,219	11.3	-12.8
Conservative	Barrie O'Keefe	1,131	5.7	+0.1	1,273	6.5	+0.8
UKIP	Roger Thomas	719	3.6	New	573	2.9	New
Green					480	2.4	+0.6
Socialist Labour					469	2.4	-1.2
BNP					379	1.9	New
Cymru Annibynnol					161	0.3	New
ProLife Alliance					61	0.3	New
Majority		11,736	59.3	+18.6			
Turnout		20,022	37.8	−10.6			
Labour Co-op hold		Swing	+4.5				

2003 Electorate: 52,927
Regional ballots rejected: 300

=== Elections in the 1990s ===
Welsh Assembly Election 1999: Blaenau Gwent
Party	Candidate	Constituency			Regional		
Party	Candidate	Votes	%	±%	Votes	%	±%
Labour Co-op	Peter Law	16,069	61.8	N/A	13,714	52.5	N/A
Plaid Cymru	Phil Williams	5,501	21.1	N/A	6,289	24.1	N/A
Liberal Democrats	Keith Rogers	2,980	11.4	N/A	2,931	11.2	N/A
Conservative	David Thomas	1,444	5.6	N/A	1,475	5.7	N/A
Socialist Labour					928	3.6	N/A
Green					463	1.8	N/A
Others					300	1.1	N/A
Majority		10,568	40.7				
Turnout		25,994	48.2				
Labour Co-op win (new seat)							
