= Liz Lloyd, Baroness Lloyd of Effra =

British political adviser

The Right Honourable The Baroness Lloyd of Effra CBE
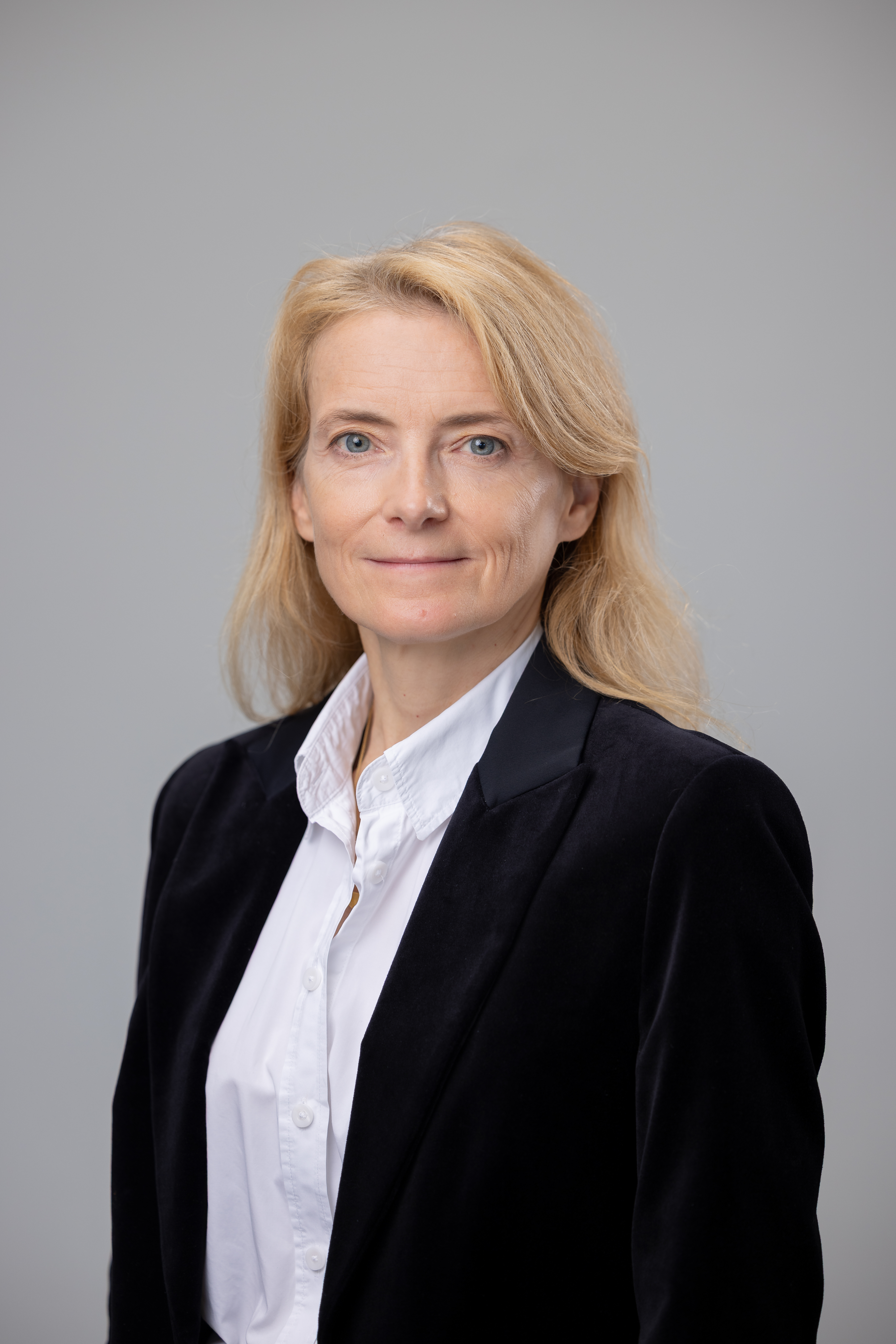
- Official portrait, 2025

Parliamentary Under-Secretary of State for Space, Cyber and Regulatory Reform (Note: Parliamentary Under-Secretary of State for Digital Economy, until July 2026)
- Incumbent
- Assumed office 11 September 2025
- Prime Minister: Keir Starmer; Andy Burnham
- Preceded by: The Baroness Jones of Whitchurch

Baroness-in-Waiting Government Whip
- In office 11 September 2025 – 12 June 2026
- Prime Minister: Keir Starmer

Member of the House of Lords
- Lord Temporal
- Life peerage 13 October 2025

Personal details
- Born: 1971 (age 54–55)
- Party: Labour

Elizabeth Ann Lloyd, Baroness Lloyd of Effra (born 1971) is a British political adviser and life peer who served as Deputy Chief of Staff for Prime Minister Tony Blair during his final term (2005–2007). Since 11 September 2025, she has been serving as Parliamentary Under-Secretary of State and Government Whip in the House of Lords, originally jointly in Department for Science, Innovation and Technology and Department for Business and Trade until July 2026, she currently serves in the Department for Business, Innovation, Science and Trade and Department for Digital, Culture, Media and Sport; she was made a life peer as Baroness Lloyd of Effra in October 2025.

== Early life ==
Lloyd was privately educated at Guildford High School before attending Clare College, Cambridge, where she graduated with a BA degree in Law and History in 1993.

== Career ==
=== Blair government ===
Lloyd began working for Tony Blair when he became Labour Leader in 1994. After Blair became Prime Minister in 1997, she became his home affairs adviser. She later worked on foreign policy in the Number 10 Policy Unit, "the powerhouse of New Labour ideas". She held a number of key coordinating roles in Number 10, and in 2005 became Deputy Chief of Staff with responsibility for much of the domestic policy agenda.

=== Banking ===
In 2007 she joined Standard Chartered, a London-based bank with a focus on Asia, Africa and the Middle East, and was later appointed Group Head of Public Affairs. From 2013 to 2015 she was CEO of Standard Chartered Bank Tanzania. In 2015 she was elected Vice-Chair of the Tanzanian Bankers Association. In 2016 she was appointed Group Company Secretary at Standard Chartered in London.

Lloyd became a trustee of The Tony Blair Governance Initiative (a registered charity) in 2009, and later became its Chair of Trustees.

=== Starmer government ===
In late 2024, some months after Keir Starmer's Labour government was elected, Lloyd returned to politics as director of policy delivery and innovation. In September 2025, as part of Starmer's cabinet reshuffle, Lloyd was appointed as the Parliamentary Under-Secretary of State in the Department for Science, Innovation and Technology and the Department for Business and Trade, as well as a baroness-in-waiting (government whip); she is to be conferred with a life peerage to assume this role.

She was created Baroness Lloyd of Effra, of Tulse Hill in the London Borough of Lambeth on 13 October 2025.

In July 2026 Lloyd was appointed by new Prime Minister Andy Burnham as Parliamentary Under-Secretary of State for Space, Cyber and Regulatory Reform jointly in the newly created Department for Business, Innovation, Science and Trade and Department for Digital, Culture, Media and Sport in July 2026.

== Personal life ==
Lloyd married in 2002, and she has two children. Lloyd was appointed a Commander of the Order of the British Empire (CBE) in the 2008 New Year Honours.
