= Maggie Jones, Baroness Jones of Whitchurch =

British trade unionist and politician (born 1955)

The Right Honourable The Baroness Jones of Whitchurch
- Official portrait, 2024

Member of the House of Lords
- Lord Temporal
- Life peerage 5 June 2006

Parliamentary Under-Secretary of State for the Future Digital Economy and Online Safety
- In office 9 July 2024 – 7 September 2025
- Prime Minister: Keir Starmer
- Preceded by: Saqib Bhatti
- Succeeded by: The Baroness Lloyd of Effra
Shadow portfolios
2010–2011	Whip
2010–2014	Culture, Media and Sport
2011–2015	Education
2015–2022	Environment, Food and Rural Affairs
2023–2024	Science, Innovation and Technology

Baroness-in-waiting Government Whip
- In office 9 July 2024 – 7 September 2025
- Prime Minister: Keir Starmer

Personal details
- Born: Margaret Beryl Jones; 22 May 1955 (age 71) Cardiff, Wales
- Party: Labour
- Education: Whitchurch High School
- Alma mater: University of Sussex (BA)

Margaret Beryl Jones, Baroness Jones of Whitchurch (born 22 May 1955) is a British Labour Peer and previously a trade union official and Labour politician. She was Chair of the Labour Party from 2000 to 2001. She served as Parliamentary Under-Secretary of State for the Future Digital Economy and Online Safety and as a Baroness in Waiting from July 2024 to September 2025.

== Early life ==
Jones was born in Cardiff to Bill and Audrey Jones, and was educated at Whitchurch High School. She then studied at the University of Sussex, gaining a BA degree in Sociology. She now lives in Hove.

== Non-political positions ==
Jones was Director of Policy and Public Affairs of the trade union UNISON until 2006. In 1979 she became a regional official of National Union of Public Employees (NUPE), which merged into UNISON.

She has a background as a housing campaigner and environmentalist as well as fighting low pay and discrimination at work. She was previously a trustee of Shelter and the Waste & Resources Action Programme as well as being on the board of the Circle 33 Housing Trust. She has been a Development Board member of ClientEarth, board member of Ombudsman Services, Chair of Rothamsted Enterprises, and President of Friends of the South Downs.

In 2020, Lady Jones was appointed as a member of the South Downs National Park Authority.

In April 2026, Jones took up her role as the new Chair of the Advisory, Conciliation and Arbitration Service (Acas) Council.

== Political career ==
=== Labour Party positions ===
Jones was a member of the Labour Party's National Executive Committee (NEC) within the trade union section from 1993 to 2005. She was elected Chair of the Labour Party in 2000, the year the Prime Minister Tony Blair controversially appointed Charles Clarke to be the similarly named Party Chairman. She was co-convener, along with Tony Blair, of the NEC Joint Policy Committee for much of her time on the NEC.

=== Unsuccessful parliamentary candidate ===
Jones was the Labour Party parliamentary candidate for the constituency of Blaenau Gwent at the 2005 general election, the safest Labour seat in Wales, and fifth safest in the UK. She was selected from a women-only shortlist which was controversially imposed upon the local party; subsequently eight of twelve members of the local executive resigned in protest. The retiring MP Llew Smith also criticised the selection method.

Peter Law, the Labour Welsh Assembly Member for the constituency, resigned from the party and stood against her as an independent. Prior to the announcement of Law's rumoured candidacy, Jones stated that Law would be "very foolish" to stand against her. She argued "Blaenau Gwent is solidly Labour and I don't think people will vote for anyone else."

Law won the seat with a majority of 9,121 votes, creating one of the media highlights of the election. The Daily Telegraph described Jones' defeat as "one of the most spectacular general election results of modern times".

=== House of Lords ===
Following her election defeat, Jones was nominated for a life peerage in 2005 by the Labour Party, according to a list leaked to The Times. This leaked list eventually led to the Cash for Peerages scandal in which Jones was not implicated. On 10 April 2006, her nomination for a peerage was officially announced, and she was gazetted as Baroness Jones of Whitchurch, of Whitchurch in the County of South Glamorgan on 5 June 2006. Jones' peerage was widely criticised, with Law stating "That is the way New Labour works. It's a poor example of patronage and power." Labour MP Paul Flynn was also critical, he argued: "This is standing democracy on its head. The House of Lords shouldn't be used to reward a candidate who has been emphatically rejected by the electorate."

On 16 November 2006, she made her maiden speech in the House of Lords during a debate on the Queen's Speech.

In June 2010 Jones joined Labour's Shadow Ministerial Team, as Labour's House of Lords Spokesperson on Culture, Olympics, Media and Sport. She was then promoted to the Shadow Spokesperson for Education and served from 2011 to 2015. From 2015, she undertook the role of Labour's Shadow Spokesperson for Environment, Food and Rural Affairs and served until 2022, before serving as Shadow Spokesperson for Science, Innovation and Technology from 2023 to 2024.

In July 2024, she was appointed Parliamentary Under Secretary of State for the Future Digital Economy and Online Safety, Parliamentary Under-Secretary of State for Legislation and as a Baroness in Waiting. In 2026, Jones was appointed as chair of Acas.

Political offices
Preceded by Vernon Hince	Chair of the Labour Party; 2000–2001	Succeeded by Margaret Wall
Orders of precedence in the United Kingdom
Preceded by The Baroness Verma	Ladies; Baroness Jones of Whitchurch	Followed by The Baroness Ford
