= Parliamentary Under-Secretary of State for Space, Cyber and Regulatory Reform =

Junior minister in the British Government

United Kingdom Parliamentary Under-Secretary of State for Space, Cyber and Regulatory Reform
- Royal Arms of His Majesty's Government

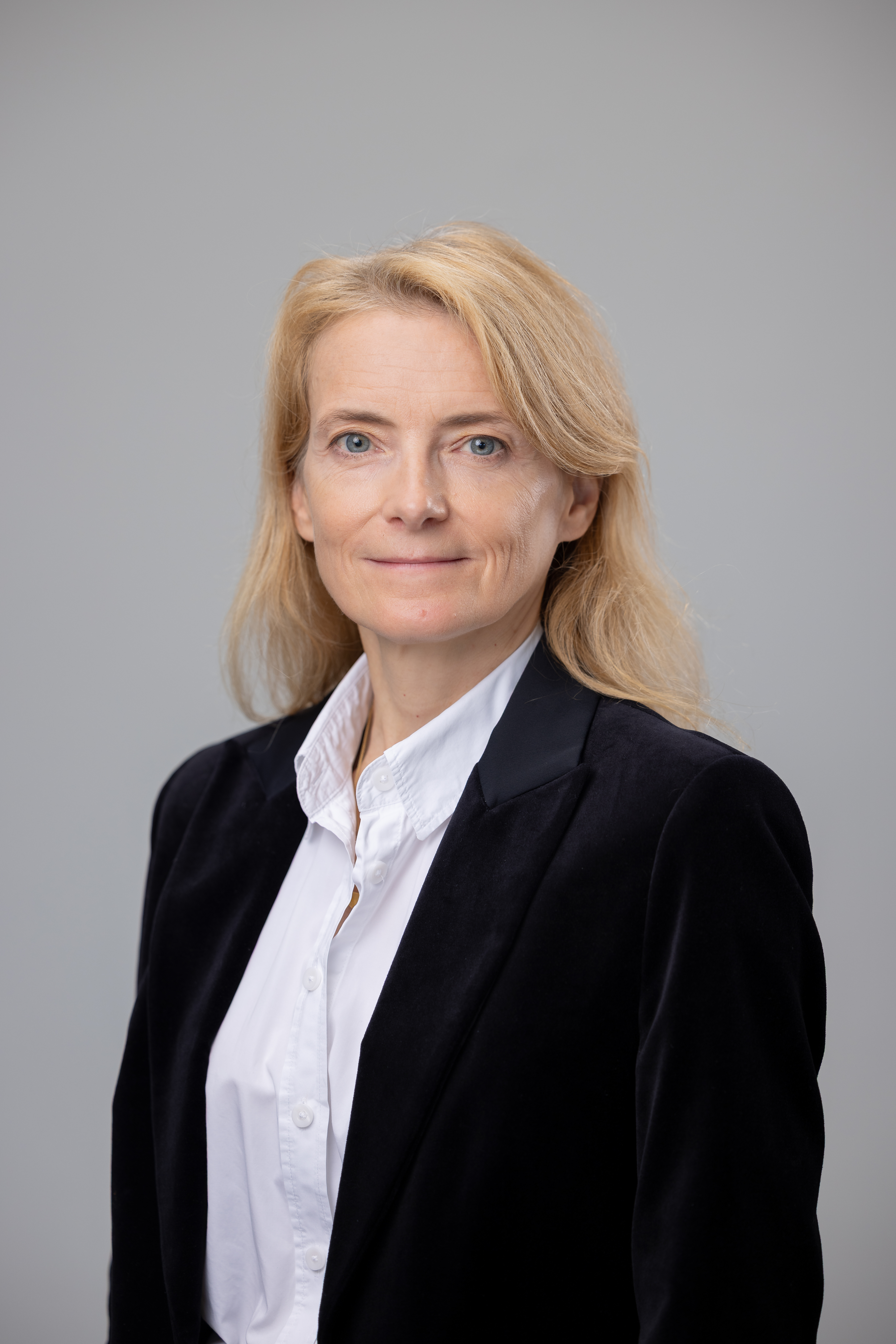
- Incumbent; Liz Lloyd, Baroness Lloyd of Effra since 11 September 2025
- Department for Business, Innovation, Science and Trade; Department for Digital, Culture, Media and Sport
- Style: Minister
- Appointer: The Monarch (on the advice of the Prime Minister)
- Term length: At His Majesty's pleasure
- Formation: 2021
- First holder: Chris Philp
- Website: www.gov.uk/government/ministers/parliamentary-under-secretary-of-state--316

The parliamentary under-secretary of state for space, cyber and regulatory reform is a junior position jointly in the Department for Business, Innovation, Science and Trade and the Department for Digital, Culture, Media and Sport in the British government. The post is currently held by Liz Lloyd, Baroness Lloyd of Effra.

== History ==
Between 2021 and 2024 the role was known as parliamentary under-secretary of state for Tech and the Digital Economy. The position was originally part of the Department for Digital, Culture, Media and Sport but was moved to the newly created Department for Science, Innovation and Technology in the February 2023 cabinet reshuffle.

== Responsibilities ==
The minister has responsibility of the following policy areas:

- Cyber
- Telecoms
- Space
- Economic security
- Regulatory Innovation Office (RIO)
- Digital inclusion and skills
- Talent – entrepreneurial and investor

== List of officeholders ==
Name	Portrait	Term of office		Party	Prime Minister
Parliamentary Under-Secretary of State for Digital and Broadband (to Feb 2020) Parliamentary Under-Secretary of State for Digital Infrastructure (from Feb 2020)
Matt Warman		26 July 2019	16 September 2021	Conservative	Boris Johnson
Parliamentary Under-Secretary of State for Tech and the Digital Economy
Chris Philp		16 September 2021	7 July 2022	Conservative	Boris Johnson
Damian Collins		8 July 2022	27 October 2022	Conservative	Boris Johnson; Liz Truss
Paul Scully		27 October 2022	13 November 2023	Conservative	Rishi Sunak
Saqib Bhatti		13 November 2023	5 July 2024	Conservative	Rishi Sunak
Parliamentary Under-Secretary of State for the Future Digital Economy and Online Safety
Maggie Jones, Baroness Jones of Whitchurch		9 July 2024	7 September 2025	Labour	Keir Starmer
Parliamentary Under-Secretary of State for Digital Economy
Liz Lloyd, Baroness Lloyd of Effra		11 September 2025	20 July 2026	Labour	Keir Starmer
Parliamentary Under-Secretary of State for Space, Cyber and Regulatory Reform
Liz Lloyd, Baroness Lloyd of Effra		21 July 2026	Incumbent	Labour	Andy Burnham
