= Blaenau Gwent People's Voice =

Welsh political party

People's Voice
- Founded: 2005
- Dissolved: August 2010
- Headquarters: None, previous at Ebbw Vale, Blaenau Gwent, Wales
- Ideology: Localism; Populism

Website
- blaenaugwentpeoplesvoice.org (Archive)

The Blaenau Gwent People's Voice Group was a political party based in the Blaenau Gwent area of Wales.

The party was formed in the aftermath of the election to the House of Commons of Peter Law as an independent Member of Parliament, beating the official Labour candidate. Peter Law stood against the official party candidate after an internal party row. His victory was one of three independent successes in the 2005 general election, the other two being Richard Taylor (Health Concern - Wyre Forest) and George Galloway (RESPECT - Bethnal Green and Bow). Dai Davies (Law's agent) was elected at a by-election following Law's death in 2006. At the 2010 general election, Davies lost the seat to Labour.

The BGPVG formed with the purpose of ensuring a continuing independent presence in the constituency, which was considered a more pressing need following the death of Peter Law in April 2006. Two by-elections were required, as Law represented the seat at Westminster and as a member of the National Assembly for Wales. The 2006 Blaenau Gwent by-elections were held on 29 June 2006 and resulted in two victories for the Party, with Dai Davies, Peter Law's former election agent, winning the Westminster seat and Law's widow Trish Law taking the Welsh Assembly seat. Neither candidate formally stood as a BGPVG candidate on the ballot papers (Davies stood as an independent and Law used no party description). Davies held the seat until he was overwhelmingly defeated by Labour's Nick Smith by over 10,500 votes at the 2010 General Election, a swing from BGPV to Labour of 29.2%.

It was registered as a political party with the Electoral Commission on 30 January 2007 under the simple name of People's Voice.

In March 2007, People's Voice signalled its aim to expand into other constituencies with Torfaen, Monmouth, Islwyn, Newport East, Swansea and Blackpool all being mentioned. However, in the nominations for the Assembly Election of May 2007, Trish Law defended her seat as an independent, and there was a People's Voice candidate only in Torfaen. While Law was successful in retaining her seat, the Group made no gains coming in third in Torfaen with 14.4% of the vote.

In the 2008 Welsh local elections People's Voice gained eight council seats, five in Blaenau Gwent County Borough Council and 3 in Torfaen County Borough Council. The Torfaen People's Voice Group has since broken up over an internal dispute over Blaenau Gwent PV Group wanting to impose a candidate on Torfaen.

In June 2010 Dai Davies said he was standing down as leader of the group and was retiring from politics. In August 2010 the party was disbanded and all five BGPVG Councillors resigned from party and sat as independents on the Council. The party planned to become a pressure group.

On 20 September 2010, the only People's Voice representative, Trish Law AM, announced that she would not seek re-election at the 2011 Assembly election. There were talks for the former MP Dai Davies to stand in place of Law, but he decided not to.
