= Dai Davies (politician) =

British politician (born 1959)

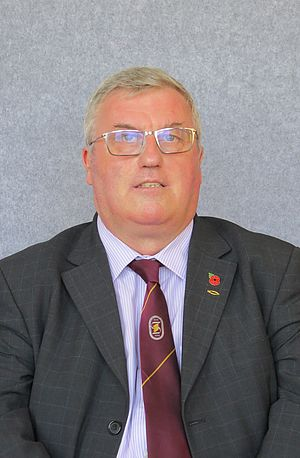

Member of Parliament for Blaenau Gwent
- In office 29 June 2006 – 12 April 2010
- Preceded by: Peter Law
- Succeeded by: Nick Smith

Personal details
- Born: David Clifford Davies; 26 November 1959 (age 66) Ebbw Vale, Monmouthshire, Wales
- Party: Independent (since 2017); People's Voice (2005–2010); Labour (before 2005)
- Spouse: Amanda
- Children: Aled

David Clifford Davies (born 26 November 1959), commonly known as Dai Davies, is a Welsh politician. He was the Member of Parliament (MP) for the Blaenau Gwent constituency in South Wales from 2006 to 2010, representing the Blaenau Gwent People's Voice Group. He was elected at a by-election in June 2006 following the death of independent MP Peter Law, but lost his seat at the 2010 general election to Labour's Nick Smith by 10,516 votes.

== Background ==
Davies was born in Ebbw Vale in 1959 and was the son and grandson of steelworkers. He attended Willowtown Secondary Modern School.

After leaving school at the age of 16, Davies worked in the electrical department at the Ebbw Vale Steelworks for 26 years; he was a senior trade union shop steward for over 15 years and a member of the Nation Industrial Committee for Steel. After losing his job at the steelworks that was shortly to close, he took a job with the union and he oversaw the loss of thousands of jobs. He was a trustee of the British Steel plc pension scheme.

Davies was a voluntary school governor at both primary and secondary level, a former chair of a Community Health Council and a Community First Partnership Board. He has been a Director of a development trust.

== Political career ==
Davies was agent for both Llew Smith and Peter Law, and a political research officer and campaign manager for Law. Until his defeat in 2010, he was the leader of Blaenau Gwent People's Voice Group, a political party that had announced intentions to expand outside his own constituency in the 2007 Assembly elections.

The election result was the first occasion an independent had held a seat occupied by a previous independent in a by-election since Sir C. V. F. Townshend held The Wrekin in 1920. The traditionally Labour seat 'returned to the fold' in electing Nick Smith on 6 May 2010, on a 29% swing to Labour and with a majority of over 10,000.

On 23 June 2010, Davies gave his first interview since being defeated by his former party. He stated that he would be leaving frontline politics and standing down as Leader of The People's Voice; after these comments the future of the party he led from 2006 became unclear. He said he would still try and work for the people of Blaenau Gwent.

In 2017, he was elected as one of three councillors for the Ebbw Vale North Ward on Blaenau Gwent Council.

== Personal life ==
Davies is married to Amanda and they live in Ebbw Vale. They have a son.
