= List of communities in Blaenau Gwent =

The communities of Blaenau Gwent in 2024.

Blaenau Gwent is a county borough in the south-east of Wales. It is one of the 22 principal areas of Wales.

Communities are the lowest tier of local government in Wales. Unlike English counties, which often contain unparished areas, all Welsh principal areas are entirely divided into communities.

There are 12 communities in Blaenau Gwent since the creation of Garnlydan in 2021, with Tredegar being both the largest and the most populated one. Five of them have a community council: Brynmawr (town council), Nantyglo and Blaina (town council), Tredegar (town council), and Abertillery and Llanhilleth (who share a single community council).

== List of communities in Blaenau Gwent ==
Community		Population (2011)	Area (km^{2}, 2011)	Pre-1974 district	Remarks	Refs	Location map
English	Welsh	Population (2011)	Area (km^{2}, 2011)	Pre-1974 district	Remarks	Refs	Location map
Abertillery	Abertyleri	11,601	18.74	Abertillery Urban District	Includes Cwmtillery and Six Bells.		
Badminton	Badminton	3,110	2.68	Ebbw Vale Urban District	Created in 2010 from the community of Beaufort.		
Beaufort	Cendl	3,866	3.44	Ebbw Vale Urban District			
Brynmawr	Brynmawr	5,530	5.82	Brynmawr Urban District	Town.		
Cwm	Cwm	4,295	9.79	Ebbw Vale Urban District	Includes Llan-dafel and Waun-Lwyd.		
Ebbw Vale North	Gogledd Glynebwy	4,561	2.49	Ebbw Vale Urban District	Created in 2010 from the community of Ebbw Vale.		
Ebbw Vale South	De Glynebwy	4,274	6.61	Ebbw Vale Urban District	Created in 2010 from the community of Ebbw Vale.		
Garnlydan	Garnlydan	896*		Ebbw Vale Urban District	Created in 2021 from the community of Beaufort.		
Llanhilleth	Llanhiledd	4,797	7.41	Ebbw Vale Urban District	Includes Aberbeeg, Brynithel, St Illtyd and Swffryd.		
Nantyglo and Blaina	Nantyglo a Blaenau	9,443	15.29	Nantyglo and Blaina Urban District	Town. Includes Blaina, Coalbrookvale and Nantyglo.		
Rassau	Rasa	3,234	4.82	Ebbw Vale Urban District	Created in 2010 from the community of Beaufort.		
Tredegar	Tredegar	15,103	31.68	Tredegar Urban District	Town. Includes Ashvale, Georgetown, Sirhowy, Tafarnaubach and Trefil.		

- Population of Garnlydan from 2021
