= List of places in Blaenau Gwent =

Map of places in Blaenau Gwent compiled from this list
See the list of places in Wales for places in other principal areas.

This is a list of places in the Blaenau Gwent county borough, South Wales.

== Administrative divisions ==
=== Electoral wards ===
- Abertillery
- Badminton
- Beaufort
- Blaina
- Brynmawr
- Cwm
- Cwmtillery
- Ebbw Vale North
- Ebbw Vale South
- Georgetown
- Llanhilleth
- Nantyglo
- Rassau
- Sirhowy
- Six Bells
- Tredegar Central & West

=== Communities ===
- Abertillery
- Badminton
- Beaufort
- Blaina
- Brynmawr
- Cwm
- Ebbw Vale North
- Ebbw Vale South
- Llanhilleth
- Nantyglo and Blaina
- Rassau
- Tredegar

== Principal towns ==
- Abertillery
- Brynmawr
- Ebbw Vale
- Tredegar
