= Blaenau Gwent County Borough Council =

Local government of Blaenau Gwent, Wales

Blaenau Gwent County Borough Council Cyngor Bwrdeistref Sirol Blaenau Gwent (Welsh)

Type
- Type: Principal council

History
- Founded: 1 April 1974

Leadership
- Presiding Member: Chris Smith, Labour since 26 May 2022
- Leader: Steve Thomas, Labour since 26 May 2022
- Chief Executive: Stephen Vickers since June 2024

Structure
- Seats: 33 councillors
- Graph of the party split among 33 seats.
- Political groups: Administration (19) Labour (19) Other parties (14) Green (1) Independent (13)
- Length of term: 5 years

Elections
- Voting system: First-past-the-post
- Last election: 5 May 2022
- Next election: 6 May 2027

Meeting place
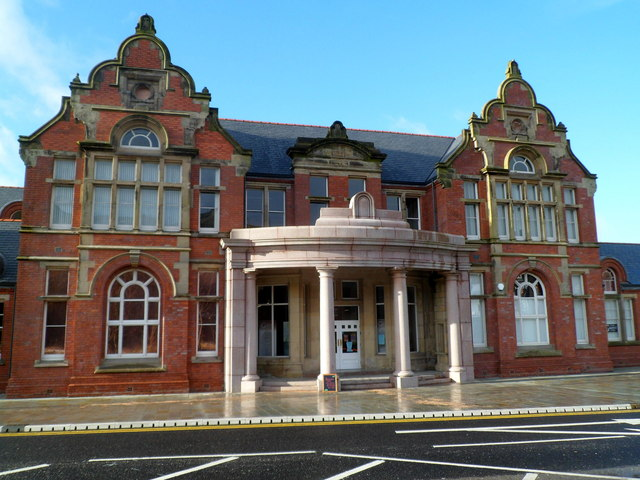
- General Offices, Steelworks Road, Ebbw Vale, NP23 6DN

Website
- www.blaenau-gwent.gov.uk

Blaenau Gwent County Borough Council (Welsh: Cyngor Bwrdeistref Sirol Blaenau Gwent) is the local authority for the county borough of Blaenau Gwent, one of the principal areas of Wales. The council is based in Ebbw Vale. It has been under Labour majority control since 2022.

== History ==
The council was first created in 1974 under the Local Government Act 1972 as a lower-tier district council. Later that year it was awarded borough status, allowing the chair of the council to take the title of mayor. Gwent County Council provided county-level services for the area. The county council was abolished in 1996 and Blaenau Gwent became a principal area, styled as a county borough, with the council taking over the functions previously performed by the county council.

The council discontinued the role of mayor in 2017, with the last mayor being Barrie Sutton. A presiding member role has been created instead to chair meetings.

In 2024 the council agreed to share a chief executive with neighbouring Torfaen County Borough Council.

== Political control ==
The council has been under Labour majority control since the 2022 election.

The first election to the council was held in 1973, initially operating as a shadow authority before coming into its powers on 1 April 1974. Political control of the council since 1974 has been as follows:

Lower-tier borough

Party in control	Years
Labour	1974–1996

County borough

Party in control	Years
Labour	1996–2008
Independent	2008–2012
Labour	2012–2017
Independent	2017–2022
Labour	2022–present

=== Leadership ===
The leaders of the council since 1976 have been:

Councillor	Party	From	To
Ron Evans	Labour		May 1976
Brian Scully	Labour	May 1976	May 1985
Lloyd Williams	Labour	May 1985	May 1987
Marilyn Pitman	Labour	May 1987	May 1991
Bernard Assinder	Labour	May 1991	23 Mar 1998
John Hopkins	Labour	Apr 1998	Nov 2007
Hedley McCarthy	Labour	Nov 2007	May 2008
Des Hillman	Independent	May 2008	10 Oct 2011
John Mason	Independent	14 Oct 2011	May 2012
Hedley McCarthy	Labour	May 2012	2 Dec 2015
Steve Thomas	Labour	2 Dec 2015	May 2017
Nigel Daniels	Independent	25 May 2017	May 2022
Steve Thomas	Labour	26 May 2022	

=== Composition ===
Following the 2022 election and subsequent changes of allegiance and by-elections up to October 2026, the composition of the council was:

Party	Seats
Labour	19
Green	1
Independent	13
Total	33

Twelve of the independent councillors sit together as a group. The next election is due in 2027.

== Elections ==
Summary of the council composition after council elections, click on the year for full details of each election.

Year	Seats	Labour	Independent	Liberal Democrats	Plaid Cymru	Conservative	Notes
1995	42	**33**	6 (Note: Including two Ratepayers' Association councillors and one Independent Labour.)	1	1	1	Labour majority control
1999	42	**34**	7 (Note: Including four Ratepayers' Association councillors and one Independent Labour.)	1	0	0	Labour majority control
2004	42	**32**	7	3	0	0	Labour majority control
2008	42	17	**23** (Note: Including five Blaenau Gwent People's Voice councillors.)	2	0	0	Independent / People's Voice / Liberal Democrat coalition
2012	42	**33**	9	0	0	0	Labour majority control
2017	42	13	**28**	0	1	0	Independent majority control
2022	33	**21**	12	0	0	0	Labour majority control. New ward boundaries.

Party with the most elected councillors in bold. Coalition agreements in notes column

== Premises ==
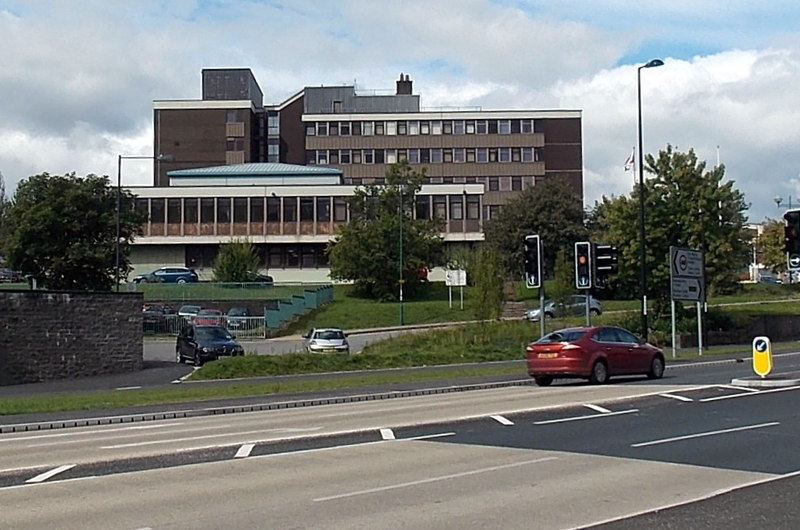
Civic Centre, Ebbw Vale: Council's headquarters until 2021.

Until 2021 the council was based at Ebbw Vale Civic Centre, which had been built in the 1960s for the former Ebbw Vale Urban District Council. In 2021 the council voted to demolish the civic centre and moved its meeting place and headquarters to the General Office building adjoining Ebbw Vale Town railway station. The General Office building had been built in 1916 as the offices for the Ebbw Vale Iron and Steel Company. The refurbished and extended building also serves as a conference centre and houses Gwent Archives.

== Electoral wards ==
Pre-2022 electoral divisions in Blaenau Gwent

Following a review by the Local Democracy and Boundary Commission for Wales the number of electoral wards reduced from 16 to 14 at the 2022 local elections. The number of councillors dropped from 42 to 33. The following table lists the pre-2022 council wards, as well as communities and associated geographical areas. Communities with a community council are indicated with an asterisk (*).

Ward	Communities	Other geographic areas
Abertillery (3 Seats - 1 No Party, 2 Labour)	Abertillery & Llanhilleth Town* (Abertillery ward)	Rhiw Park, Aberillery Park
Badminton (2 seats)	That part of the Community of Beaufort specified in relation to the existing district ward of Badminton in column 2 of the Schedule to the Blaenau Gwent (Electoral Arrangements) Order 1986	Newchurch, Glyncoed
Beaufort (2 seats)	That part of the Community of Beaufort specified in relation to the existing district ward of Badminton in column 2 of the Schedule to the Blaenau Gwent (Electoral Arrangements) Order 1986	Garn Lydan, Carmeltown,
Blaina (3 seats)	Nantyglo & Blaina Town* (Blaina ward)	Cwm Celyn, Bournville
Brynmawr (3 seats)	Brynmawr Town*	
Cwm (2 seats)	Cwm	Waunllwyd
Cwmtillery (3 seats)	Abertillery & Llanhilleth Town* (Cwmtillery ward)	Rose Heyworth
Ebbw Vale North (3 seats)	That part of the Community of Ebbw Vale specified in relation to the existing district ward of Ebbw Vale North in column 2 of the Schedule to the Blaenau Gwent (Electoral Arrangements) Order 1986	Mountain Air, Willowtown, Waun-y-pound, Newtown
Ebbw Vale South (2 seats)	That part of the Community of Ebbw Vale not contained in the Ebbw Vale North ward	Garden City, Tyllwyn, Hilltop, Briery Hill
Georgetown (2 seats)	Tredegar Town* (Georgetown ward)	Troedrhiwgwair, Peacehaven
Llanhilleth (3 seats)	Abertillery & Llanhilleth Town* (Llanhilleth ward)	Brynithel, Aberbeeg, Swffryd
Nantyglo (3 seats)	Nantyglo & Blaina Town* (Nantyglo ward)	Winchestown, Coalbrookvale, Garn Fach, Coed Cae
Rassau (2 seats)	That part of the pre-2010 community of Beaufort not contained in the Badminton and Beaufort wards	Nantycroft
Sirhowy (3 seats)	Tredegar Town* (Sirhowy ward)	Tafarnaubach, Waundeg, Trevil, Dukestown, Rhoslan
Six Bells (2 seats)	Abertillery & Llanhilleth Town* (Six Bells ward)	Warm Turn
Tredegar Central and West (4 seats)	Tredegar Town* (Central and West ward)	Bedwellty Pits, Cefn Golau, Ashvale

== Criticism of councillors' conduct ==
Joanne Collins, the council's executive member for education and also a governor of her son's primary school took her family on holiday during school term time, "in direct contravention of her department's own policy", reported Private Eye in April 2020. The council reportedly distributes a pamphlet titled "School Attendance - a guide for parents of children starting school" that clearly states Blaenau Gwent Council "requested headteachers do not authorise any holidays in term time". The booklet had been published by Families First, a Welsh Government project, in conjunction with the council. Collins' action reportedly caused resentment among local families who had been refused permission to take a holiday during term time to save on cost. In response, council leader, Nigel Daniels, issued a statement to the South Wales Argus newspaper stating the "holiday in question was authorised ... and fully complied with the policy".

== Arms ==
Coat of arms of Blaenau Gwent County Borough Council
Notes Originally granted to Blaenau Gwent Borough Council on 13 November 1975. Crest On a wreath of the colours upon a rocky mount Proper a dragon passant Gules breathing flames collared with a ring of steel and supporting with the dexter foreleg a pair of millrolls Proper. Escutcheon Paly wavy of six Argent and Vert on a chief dancetty of three points downward per pale Azure and Sable three fleurs de lys Or. Supporters On either side a dragon Gules breathing flames collared with a ring of steel and supporting with the dexter foreleg a pick axe head downward Proper. Motto Unbed A Rhyddid (Unity & Freedom) Badge A roundel paly wavy of six Argent and Vert charged with six fleurs de lys Or.
