= 2017 Blaenau Gwent County Borough Council election =

2017 Welsh local government election

- 4 May 2017

All 42 seats to Blaenau Gwent County Borough Council 22 seats needed for a majority
	First party	Second party	Third party
	Ind	Lab	Pla
Party	Independent	Labour	Plaid Cymru
Seats before	9	33	0
Seats won	28	13
Seat change	▲19	▼20	▲1
Popular vote	24,262	19,334	1,108
Percentage	53.7%	42.8%	2.5%
Swing	▲12.3%	▼12.8%	▲1.0%
- Results of the 2017 Blaenau Gwent County Borough Council election
Leader before election
Labour
Subsequent Leader
Nigel John Daniels
Independent

As part of the 2017 local elections in Wales on 4 May 2017, the 42 seats of Blaenau Gwent County Borough Council were up for election. The majority of members elected were independents, replacing the previous Labour administration.

== Election result ==
Blaenau Gwent Borough Council Election 2017
Party	Seats	Gains	Losses	Net gain/loss	Seats %	Votes %	Votes	+/−
Independent	28	19	0	▲19	66.7	53.7	24,262	▲12.3
Labour	13	0	20	▼20	31.0	42.8	19,334	▼12.8
Plaid Cymru	1	1	0	▲1	2.4	2.5	1,108	▲1.0
Conservative	0	0	0	0	0.0	0.8	379	▲0.4
Green	0	0	0	0	0.0	0.2	68	▼0.2

== Ward results ==
=== Abertillery ===
Abertillery ward (three seats)
Party	Candidate	Votes	%	±%
Independent	Nigel John Daniels	914	26.5	
Independent	Julie Holt	755	21.9	
Independent	Martin John Cook	754	21.9	
Labour	Keith Gerald Chaplin	400	11.6	
Labour	Ross Thomas Leadbeater	364	10.6	
Labour	Ronald George Boden	263	7.6	
Majority				
Turnout		3,450		
Independent hold		Swing		
Independent gain from Labour		Swing		
Independent gain from Labour		Swing		

=== Badminton ===
Badminton ward (two seats)
Party	Candidate	Votes	%	±%
Independent	Clive Meredith	534	28.2	
Independent	Gregory Allyn Paulsen	300	15.8	
Labour	Brian John Scully	278	14.7	
Labour	John Thomas Rogers	221	11.7	
Independent	Garry Evans	215	11.3	
Independent	Bernard Price	158	8.3	
Conservative	Tracey Michelle West	121	6.4	
Green	Matthew Edward Barney	68	3.6	
Majority				
Turnout		1,895		
Independent hold		Swing		
Independent gain from Labour		Swing		

=== Beaufort ===
Beaufort ward (two seats)
Party	Candidate	Votes	%	±%
Independent	Godfrey Rhys Thomas	667	31.4	
Independent	Stewart Healy	463	21.8	
Labour	Francis Roy Lynch	428	20.1	
Labour	David William White	330	15.5	
Independent	Sean Watts	238	11.2	
Majority				
Turnout		2,126		
Independent hold		Swing		
Independent gain from Labour		Swing		

=== Blaina ===
Blaina ward (three seats)
Party	Candidate	Votes	%	±%
Independent	Garth Perry Collier	798	25.3	
Independent	John Patrick Morgan	518	16.4	
Labour	Lisa Catherine Winnett	413	13.1	
Independent	Desmond Hillman	395	12.5	
Labour	Thomas John Watkins	384	12.2	
Labour	Robert Pagett	353	11.2	
Independent	Howard Clarke	288	9.1	
Majority				
Turnout		3,149		
Independent hold		Swing		
Independent gain from Labour		Swing		
Labour hold		Swing		

=== Brynmawr ===
Brynmawr ward (three seats)
Party	Candidate	Votes	%	±%
Independent	Wayne Kevin Hodgins	1,433	32.7	
Independent	David Lyn Elias	575	13.1	
Independent	Richard John Hill	487	11.1	
Labour	Barrie Morgan Sutton	428	9.8	
Labour	Julian Matthew Gardner	421	9.6	
Plaid Cymru	Mark Cyril Holborn	308	7.0	
Labour	Sally-Anne Megan Morgan	307	7.0	
Independent	Grant Hughes	264	6.0	
Independent	Nigel Daragh Boyd	160	3.7	
Majority				
Turnout		4,383		
Independent hold		Swing		
Independent hold		Swing		
Independent gain from Labour		Swing		

=== Cwm ===
Cwm ward (two seats)
Party	Candidate	Votes	%	±%
Labour	Derrick Bevan	609	28.4	
Plaid Cymru	Gareth Leslie Davies	588	27.5	
Independent	Keith Edwin Barnes	489	22.8	
Labour	Keren Bender	456	21.3	
Majority				
Turnout		2,142		
Labour hold		Swing		
Plaid Cymru gain from Labour		Swing		

=== Cwmtillery ===
Cwmtillery ward (three seats)
Party	Candidate	Votes	%	±%
Independent	Malcolm Day	771	20.6	
Independent	Joanna Wilkins	729	19.5	
Labour	Timothy Huw Sharrem	705	18.8	
Independent	Antony Michael Partridge	671	17.9	
Labour	Delwyn Davies	477	12.7	
Labour	Christine Anne Tidey	391	10.4	
Majority				
Turnout		3,744		
Labour hold		Swing		
Independent gain from Labour		Swing		
Independent gain from Labour		Swing		

=== Ebbw Vale North ===
Ebbw Vale North ward (three seats)
Party	Candidate	Votes	%	±%
Independent	David Clifford Davies	865	26.2	
Independent	Robert John Summers	682	20.6	
Independent	Phillip John Edwards	668	20.2	
Labour	Carl Derek Bainton	476	14.4	
Labour	Sarah Ann Lewis	350	10.6	
Labour	Dawn Wilcox	262	7.9	
Majority				
Turnout		3,303		
Independent gain from Labour		Swing		
Independent gain from Labour		Swing		
Independent gain from Labour		Swing		

=== Ebbw Vale South ===
Ebbw Vale South ward (two seats)
Party	Candidate	Votes	%	±%
Independent	Jonathan David Millard	619	31.9	
Independent	Keith Clark Pritchard	549	28.3	
Labour	Mostyn James Lewis	420	21.6	
Labour	Brian Keith Clements	352	18.1	
Majority				
Turnout		1,940		
Independent gain from Labour		Swing		
Independent gain from Labour		Swing		

=== Georgetown ===
Georgetown ward (two seats)
Party	Candidate	Votes	%	±%
Labour	John Charles Morgan	735	41.6	
Labour	Keith Hayden	628	35.5	
Independent	Howard Clarke	405	22.9	
Majority				
Turnout		1,768		
Labour hold		Swing		
Labour hold		Swing		

=== Llanhilleth ===
Llanhilleth ward (three seats)
Party	Candidate	Votes	%	±%
Independent	Norman Lee Parsons	620	17.7	
Independent	Joanne Collins	564	16.1	
Labour	Hedley McCarthy	482	13.8	
Labour	Helen Cunningham	471	13.4	
Labour	James Christopher McIlwee	444	12.7	
Independent	Michael John Bartlett	345	9.8	
Independent	William Francis Adams	248	7.1	
Independent	Ivor Jeffrey Beynon	195	5.6	
Independent	Neil Richard Lawrence	135	3.9	
Majority				
Turnout		3,504		
Labour hold		Swing		
Independent gain from Labour		Swing		
Independent gain from Labour		Swing		

=== Nantyglo ===
Nantyglo ward (three seats)
Party	Candidate	Votes	%	±%
Independent	John Edward Mason	627	24.2	
Independent	Keri Rowson	611	23.5	
Labour	Peter John Baldwin	590	22.7	
Labour	Malcolm Benjamin Dally	443	17.1	
Labour	George William Alexander Petrie	324	12.5	
Majority				
Turnout		2,595		
Labour hold		Swing		
Independent hold		Swing		
Independent gain from Labour		Swing		

=== Rassau ===
Rassau ward (two seats)
Party	Candidate	Votes	%	±%
Labour	David Hendry Wilkshire	523	25.8	
Independent	Gareth Alban Davies	489	24.2	
Labour	Lee Anthony Moses	383	18.9	
Independent	Matthew Thomas Phillips	371	18.3	
Conservative	Leon Donald Victor Brake	162	8.0	
Conservative	Stacey Hale	96	4.7	
Majority				
Turnout		2,024		
Labour hold		Swing		
Independent hold		Swing		

=== Sirhowy ===
Sirhowy ward (three seats)
Party	Candidate	Votes	%	±%
Independent	Brian Thomas	797	22.1	
Labour	Thomas George Smith	766	21.3	
Labour	Malcolm Cross	746	20.7	
Labour	Diane Rowberry	745	20.7	
Independent	Tony Gregory	546	15.2	
Majority				
Turnout		3,600		
Labour hold		Swing		
Labour hold		Swing		
Independent gain from Labour		Swing		

=== Six Bells ===
Six Bells ward (two seats)
Party	Candidate	Votes	%	±%
Independent	Denzil Hancock	403	28.0	
Independent	Mark Holland	328	22.8	
Plaid Cymru	Stephen Richard Bard	292	20.3	
Labour	John Tiley	274	19.1	
Labour	Peter Alexander Gordon Adamson	140	9.7	
Majority				
Turnout		1,437		
Independent gain from Labour		Swing		
Independent gain from Labour		Swing		

=== Tredegar Central & West ===
Tredegar Central & West ward (four seats)
Party	Candidate	Votes	%	±%
Independent	Amanda Moore	741	22.5	
Labour	Stephen Colin Thomas	696	21.1	
Labour	Bernard George Willis	635	19.3	
Labour	Haydn Leslie Trollope	620	18.8	
Labour	Anita Mary Hobbs	601	18.3	
Majority				
Turnout		3,293		
Independent gain from Labour		Swing		
Labour hold		Swing		
Labour hold		Swing		
Labour hold		Swing		

== Changes between 2017 and 2021 ==
In March 2018 Gareth Davies (Cwm), Plaid Cymru's only councillor in the area, resigned from the party.
