= Coalbrookvale =

Village in Wales

Coordinates: 51.77765°N 3.16593°W

Coalbrookvale: Welsh: Glyn Nant-y-glo
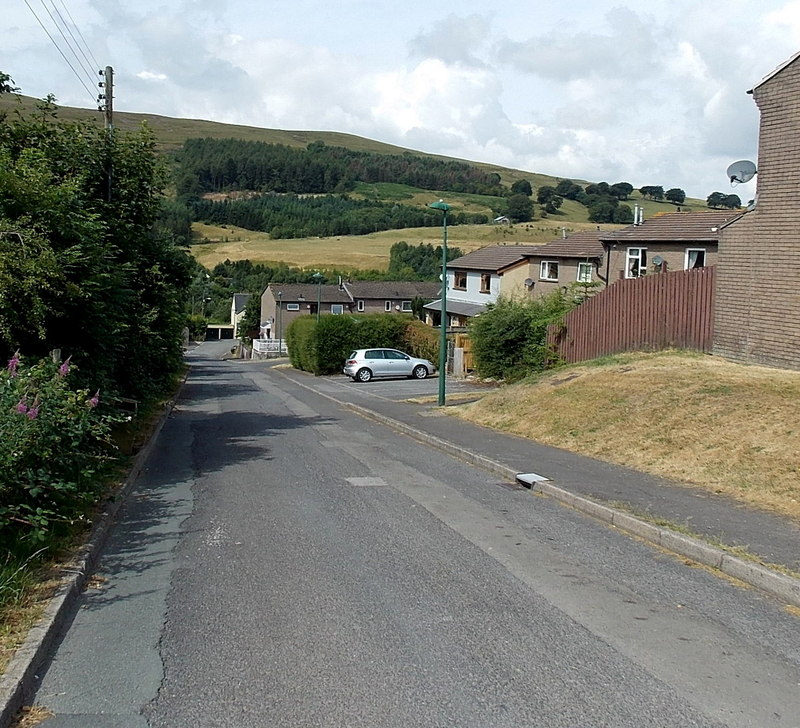
- The road from Queen Street towards Coalbrookvale

- Location within Blaenau Gwent
- OS grid reference: SO194094
- Community: Nantyglo and Blaina
- Principal area: Blaenau Gwent
- Preserved county: Blaenau Gwent
- Country: Wales
- Sovereign state: United Kingdom
- Post town: EBBW VALE
- Postcode district: NP13
- Dialling code: 01495
- Police: Gwent
- Fire: South Wales
- Ambulance: Welsh
- UK Parliament: Blaenau Gwent and Rhymney
- Senedd Cymru – Welsh Parliament: Blaenau Gwent

Coalbrookvale (Welsh: Glyn Nant-y-glo) is a village in the Ebbw Valley in Blaenau Gwent. It belongs in the community of Nantyglo and Blaina.

It is located 1.32 miles (2.12 km) south of Brynmawr and 3.38 miles (5.44 km) north of Abertillery. It is 21 miles (34 km) from Newport. The A467 runs near to the village.

== History ==
In 1820 the Coalbrook Vale Iron works opened in the town, established by Mr George Brewer. He was originally from Coalbrookdale hence the similar name given to the area. The ironworks closed in 1878 but the coal mine remained in place, and had 613 employees in 1896. It was served by the Nantyglo railway station which had opened.

By 1908 the mine had reduced to 116 employees and only one pit was still open. In 1918 it was taken over by Silvanus Jones & Co Ltd who added a drift to employ a total of 250 men. It closed in approximately 1938.

== Village today ==
Facilities in Coalbrookvale include Ysgol Gymraeg Bro Helyg, Coed-Y-Garn Primary School, Tai Calon Community Housing, a Methodist church, a mosque, an ATM, and the nearby West Monmouthshire Golf Club. There are two large parks to the north and south of the village including Central Park.

Coalbrookvale House in the village is an example of an early 19th century managers house.

== Transport ==
The village is a 26-minute walk, and 1.3 miles (2.1 km) from Brynmawr where Brynmawr Bus Station offers services to Ebbw Vale Town railway station as well as buses to Cardiff, Newport, Tredegar, Pontypool, and Newbridge.

The town is served by the nearby bus stop which provides connections to Stagecoach South Wales services:

- X1 (Cwmbran-Brynmawr)
- X15 (Newport-Brynmawr and Abertillery)
- X1 (Cwmbran-Brynmawr and Pontypool)
- 91 (Abertillery)

== Governance ==
The Nantyglo electoral ward serves the village. The ward is represented by Councillors John Edward Mason (Nantyglo, Ind), Peter Baldwin (Nantyglo, Lab), and Keri Rowson (Llanhilleth, Ind).

The area is represented in the Senedd by Alun Davies (Labour) and the Member of Parliament is Nick Smith (Labour).
