= Six Bells =

Coordinates: 51.7232°N 3.1279°W

Six Bells: Welsh: Chwe Chloch
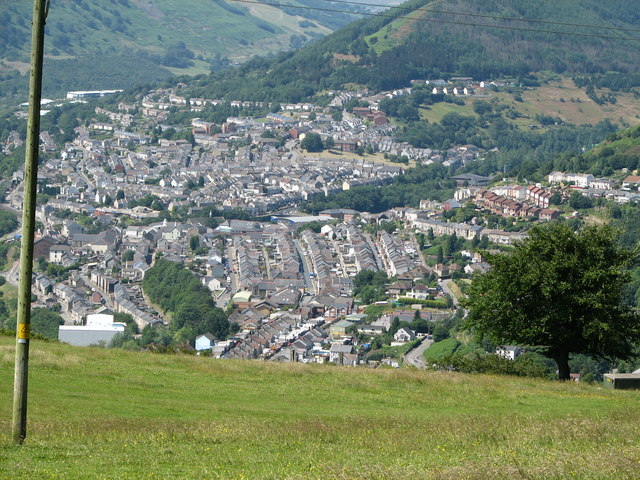
- Six Bells and Cwm Nant-y-groes

- Location within Blaenau Gwent
- Population: 4,797 (Llanhilleth) (2011)
- OS grid reference: SO221032
- Community: Six Bells
- Principal area: Blaenau Gwent
- Preserved county: Blaenau Gwent
- Country: Wales
- Sovereign state: United Kingdom
- Post town: ABERTILLERY
- Postcode district: NP13
- Dialling code: 01495
- Police: Gwent
- Fire: South Wales
- Ambulance: Welsh
- UK Parliament: Blaenau Gwent and Rhymney
- Senedd Cymru – Welsh Parliament: Blaenau Gwent

Six Bells (Welsh: Chwe Chloch) is an electoral ward and neighbourhood in Abertillery, Blaenau Gwent, Wales. It was originally a village that grew up around the local coal mines. The ward elects two county councillors to Blaenau Gwent County Borough Council.

== History and description ==
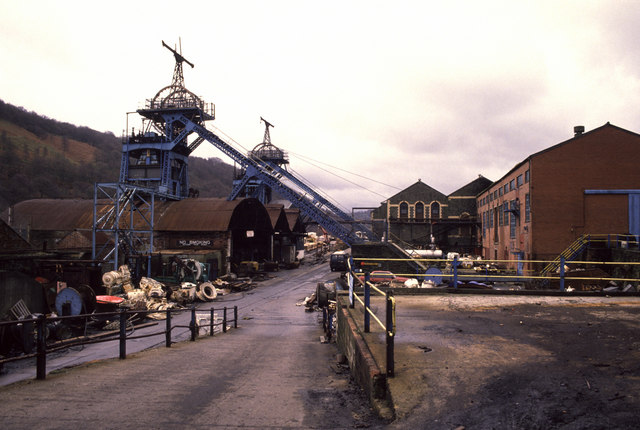
The former Colliery at Six Bells

The village of Six Bells developed in part of Llanhilleth parish during the mid-19th century, with the growth of the coal industry in the area. It may have gained its name from the Six Bells public house. Employment would originally have centred around the Hafod Fan pit, which was later replaced by the larger Arael Griffin colliery, which opened in 1898 and later became known as Six Bells Colliery. The village was incorporated into Abertillery Urban District and, in the early years of the 20th-century, Alexandra Road and Richmond Road were built which joined Six Bells with Abertillery town to the north. Most of the houses of Six Bells lie immediately east of the River Ebbw.

Six Bells Halt railway station closed in 1962.

Six Bells is the most Easterly Human settlement in Blaenau Gwent.

According to the 2011 census the population of Six Bells was 2,396 (with 198 being able to read, speak or write Welsh).

=== Six Bells Colliery disaster ===
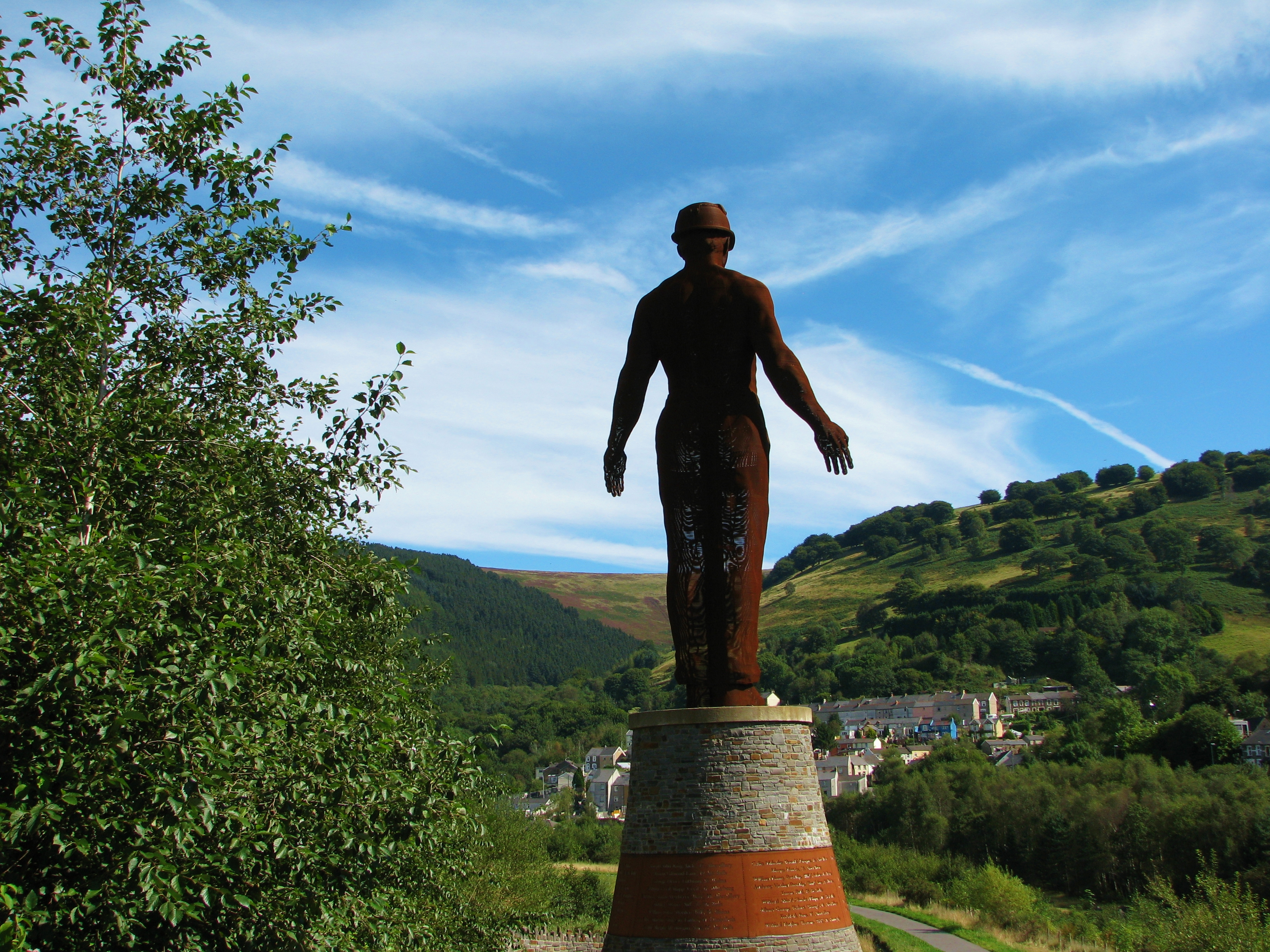
Guardian, overlooking Six Bells

On 28 June 1960, 45 men were killed by an explosion at the Six Bells Colliery. On the 50th anniversary a 20 metre high memorial sculpture was unveiled by Rowan Williams, Archbishop of Canterbury on the colliery site. Called Guardian, the monument was described as the Welsh answer to Antony Gormley's Angel of the North. The colliery closed in 1988.

== Governance ==
Six Bells is in the Blaenau Gwent and Rhymney parliamentary constituency for elections to the UK parliament and Blaenau Gwent for elections to the Welsh Senedd.

=== Town Council ===
Six Bells is a ward of Abertillery and Llanhilleth Town Council, electing three town councillors.

=== County Council ===
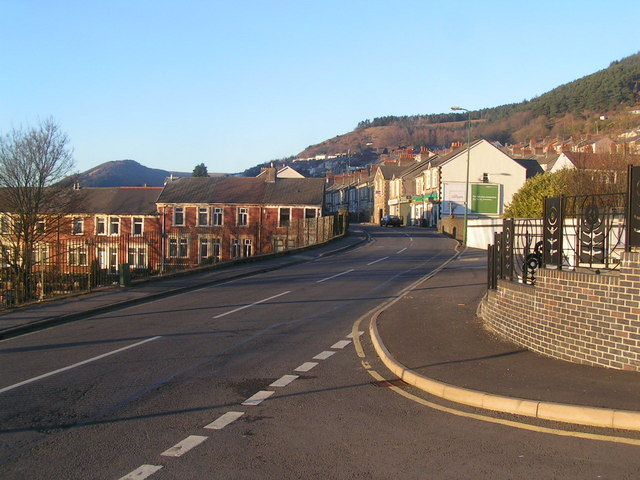
Jubilee Road

The Six Bells county ward elects two county councillors to Blaenau Gwent County Borough Council. It is bordered to the north by Abertillery and to the south by the Llanhilleth ward. To the east is the Abersychan ward of Torfaen.

At the May 2017 elections the ward elected two Independent councillors, Denzil Hancock and Mark Holland. Since 1995 the ward has elected a mixture of Labour, Independent and Plaid Cymru representatives, with Cllr Hancock being elected for Plaid Cymru in 1995 though subsequently standing as an independent.

County councillors 1995 – date
Election	Independent	Labour	Plaid Cymru
2017	2	-	-
2012	1	1	-
2008	2	-	-
2004	1	1	-
1999	1	1	-
1995	-	1	1
