= Llan-dafel =

Coordinates: 51.726149°N 3.172838°W

Llan-dafel: Llandafal
- Location within Blaenau Gwent
- OS grid reference: SO178037
- Community: Cwm
- Principal area: Blaenau Gwent
- Preserved county: Blaenau Gwent
- Country: Wales
- Sovereign state: United Kingdom
- Post town: Ebbw Vale
- Postcode district: NP23
- Dialling code: 01495
- Police: Gwent
- Fire: South Wales
- Ambulance: Welsh
- UK Parliament: Blaenau Gwent and Rhymney
- Senedd Cymru – Welsh Parliament: Blaenau Gwent

Llan-dafel (also referred to as Llandafal) is a village in the community of Cwm, in the Ebbw Valley in Blaenau Gwent.

It is located 4 miles (6.4 km) south of Ebbw Vale and 2 miles (3.2 km) west of Abertillery. It is 12.22 miles (19.67 km) north west of Newport. The A4046 runs near to the village.

== Geography ==
The area is the location of the Aberbeeg Enduro Track (motocross track), a track site designated as legal by Blaenau Gwent Borough Council.

The area is not to be confused with Tai Calon Community Housing's Ebbw Vale Llandafal Court site in Ebbw Vale, a Supported Living scheme built in 1989 on part of the former Dyffryn School site.

== Transport ==
The village is a 12-minute walk, and 0.6 miles (0.97 km) from Tredegar, where Tredegar Bus Station offers services to Ebbw Vale Town railway station, as well as buses to Newport, and local villages.

The town's Waterloo Terrace stop is on the route between Newport and Ebbw Vale/Tredegar which provides connections to Stagecoach South Wales services:

- 98 (Ebbw Vale-Abertillery/Brynmawr)
- E3 (Ebbw Vale-Brynmawr)
- 62 (Ebbw Vale-Cwmbran)

== Governance ==
The Llan-dafel electoral ward serves the village. The ward is represented by Councillors Derrick Bevan (Cwm, Lab) and Gareth Leslie Davies (Cwm, PC).

The area is represented in the Senedd by Alun Davies (Labour) and the Member of Parliament is Nick Smith (Labour).
