= 2022 Blaenau Gwent County Borough Council election =

2022 Welsh local government election

- 5 May 2022

All 33 seats to Blaenau Gwent County Borough Council 17 seats needed for a majority
	First party	Second party
Leader	N/A	N/A
Party	Labour	Independent
Leader's seat	N/A	N/A
Seats before	13	28
Seats won	21	12
Seat change	▲8	▼16
Popular vote	16,980	15,141
Percentage	N/A	N/A

The 2022 Blaenau Gwent County Borough Council election took place on Thursday 5 May 2022 to elect the 33 members to the Blaenau Gwent County Borough Council in Wales, as a part of both the 2022 Welsh local elections, and the 2022 United Kingdom local elections. The electoral ward divisions had been altered, and the number of councillors elected had dropped from 33 to 30. Labour retook the council from the Independents.

== Results summary ==
2022 Blaenau Gwent County Borough Council election
Party	Seats	Gains	Losses	Net gain/loss	Seats %	Votes %	Votes	+/−
Labour	21	8	0	▲8	63.6	49.9	16,980	+7.1
Independent	12	1	8	▼16	36.4	44.5	15,141	-9.2
Plaid Cymru	0	0	1	▼1	0.0	4.3	1,480	+1.8
Conservative	0	0	0	0	0.0	0.9	300	+0.1
Green	0	0	0	0	0.0	0.4	122	+0.2

Labour regained a majority control of the council at the 2022 local elections. The former Independent leader of the council, Nigel Daniels, lost his seat.

== Ward results ==
=== Abertillery & Six Bells ===
Abertillery & Six Bells
Party	Candidate	Votes	%
Labour	Keith Chaplin	867	51.0
Labour	Ross Leadbeater	835	49.1
Independent	Julie Holt	737	43.4
Independent	Nigel Daniels	712	41.9
Independent	Martin Cook	532	31.3
Independent	Josh Rawcliffe	303	17.8
Turnout		1,700	
Labour win (new seat)			
Labour win (new seat)			
Independent win (new seat)			

=== Beaufort ===
Beaufort
Party	Candidate	Votes	%
Labour	Dean Woods	906	56.3
Independent	Godfrey Thomas	845	52.5
Labour	Chris Smith	842	52.4
Independent	Stewart Healy	645	40.1
Independent	Greg Paulsen	543	33.8
Turnout		1,608	
Labour gain from Independent			
Independent hold			
Labour win (new seat)			

=== Blaina ===
Blaina
Party	Candidate	Votes	%
Labour	Lisa Winnett	770	68.0
Independent	John Morgan	722	63.7
Independent	Des Hillman	317	28.0
Turnout		1,133	
Labour gain from Independent			
Independent hold			

=== Brynmawr ===
Brynmawr
Party	Candidate	Votes	%
Independent	Wayne Hodgins	1,207	80.3
Labour	Jules Gardner	600	39.9
Independent	John Hill	504	33.5
Independent	Lyn Elias	463	30.8
Independent	David Cook	397	26.4
Turnout		1,503	
Independent hold			
Labour gain from Independent			
Independent hold			

=== Cwm ===
Cwm
Party	Candidate	Votes	%
Independent	George Humphreys	544	48.4
Labour	Derrick Bevan	521	46.4
Labour	Nicola Williams	442	39.4
Independent	Gareth Davies	295	26.3
Green	Anne Price	122	10.9
Conservative	Lucina Field	89	7.9
Turnout		1,123	
Independent gain from Plaid Cymru			
Labour hold			

=== Cwmtillery ===
Cwmtillery
Party	Candidate	Votes	%
Independent	Malcolm Day	537	50.0
Independent	Joanna Wilkins	525	48.9
Labour	Liam Anstey	416	38.7
Labour	Sonia Wright	400	37.2
Independent	Andrew Boulton	120	11.2
Turnout		1,074	
Independent hold			
Independent hold			

=== Ebbw Vale North ===
Ebbw Vale North
Party	Candidate	Votes	%
Labour	Jen Morgan	488	48.3
Independent	Dai Davies	441	43.7
Labour	Gemma Badham	427	42.3
Independent	Suzanne Jones	286	28.3
Independent	Bob Summers	183	18.1
Turnout		1,010	
Labour gain from Independent			
Independent hold			

=== Ebbw Vale South ===
Ebbw Vale South
Party	Candidate	Votes	%
Independent	Carl Bainton	385	41.4
Labour	Suzanne Edmunds	354	38.0
Independent	Jonathan Millard	320	34.4
Labour	Adam King	296	31.8
Independent	Keith Pritchard	269	28.9
Conservative	Georgia Palfrey	97	10.4
Turnout		931	
Independent hold			
Labour gain from Independent			

A few days after being elected as an independent, Carl Bainton changed his allegiance to Labour.

=== Georgetown ===
Georgetown
Party	Candidate	Votes	%
Labour	John Morgan	765	71.3
Labour	Jacqueline Thomas	645	60.1
Plaid Cymru	Andrew Davies	404	37.7
Turnout		1,073	
Labour hold			
Labour hold			

=== Llanhilleth ===
Llanhilleth
Party	Candidate	Votes	%
Labour	Helen Cunningham	472	45.3
Independent	Lee Parsons	425	40.8
Labour	Cheryl Hucker	407	39.1
Independent	Gill Clark	313	30.1
Plaid Cymru	Ben Owen-Jones	207	19.9
Plaid Cymru	Barrie Page	119	11.4
Turnout		1,041	
Labour hold			
Independent hold			

=== Nantyglo ===
Nantyglo
Party	Candidate	Votes	%
Labour	Peter Baldwin	639	67.5
Labour	Sonia Behr	547	57.8
Independent	Keri Rowson	405	42.8
Turnout		947	
Labour gain from Independent			
Labour gain from Independent			

=== Rassau & Garnlydan ===
Rassau & Garnlydan
Party	Candidate	Votes	%
Labour	David Wilkshire	597	59.5
Independent	Gareth Davies	578	57.6
Independent	Phil Edwards	394	39.2
Turnout		1,004	
Labour win (new seat)			
Independent win (new seat)			

=== Sirhowy ===
Sirhowy
Party	Candidate	Votes	%
Labour	Tommy Smith	1,001	67.3
Labour	Malcolm Cross	904	60.8
Labour	Diane Rowberry	879	59.1
Independent	Steve Gough	491	33.0
Independent	Brian Thomas	436	29.3
Turnout		1,487	
Labour gain from Independent			
Labour hold			
Labour hold			

=== Tredegar ===
Tredegar
Party	Candidate	Votes	%
Labour	Steve Thomas	691	58.5
Labour	Haydn Trollope	661	56.0
Labour	Ellen Jones	608	51.5
Plaid Cymru	Gail Davies	282	23.9
Independent	Mandy Moore	267	22.6
Plaid Cymru	Richard Sheehy	248	21.0
Plaid Cymru	Matt Rees	220	18.6
Conservative	Phillip Trolley	114	9.7
Turnout		1,181	
Labour win (new seat)			
Labour win (new seat)			
Labour win (new seat)			
