= Garnlydan =

Village and community in Blaenau Gwent, Wales

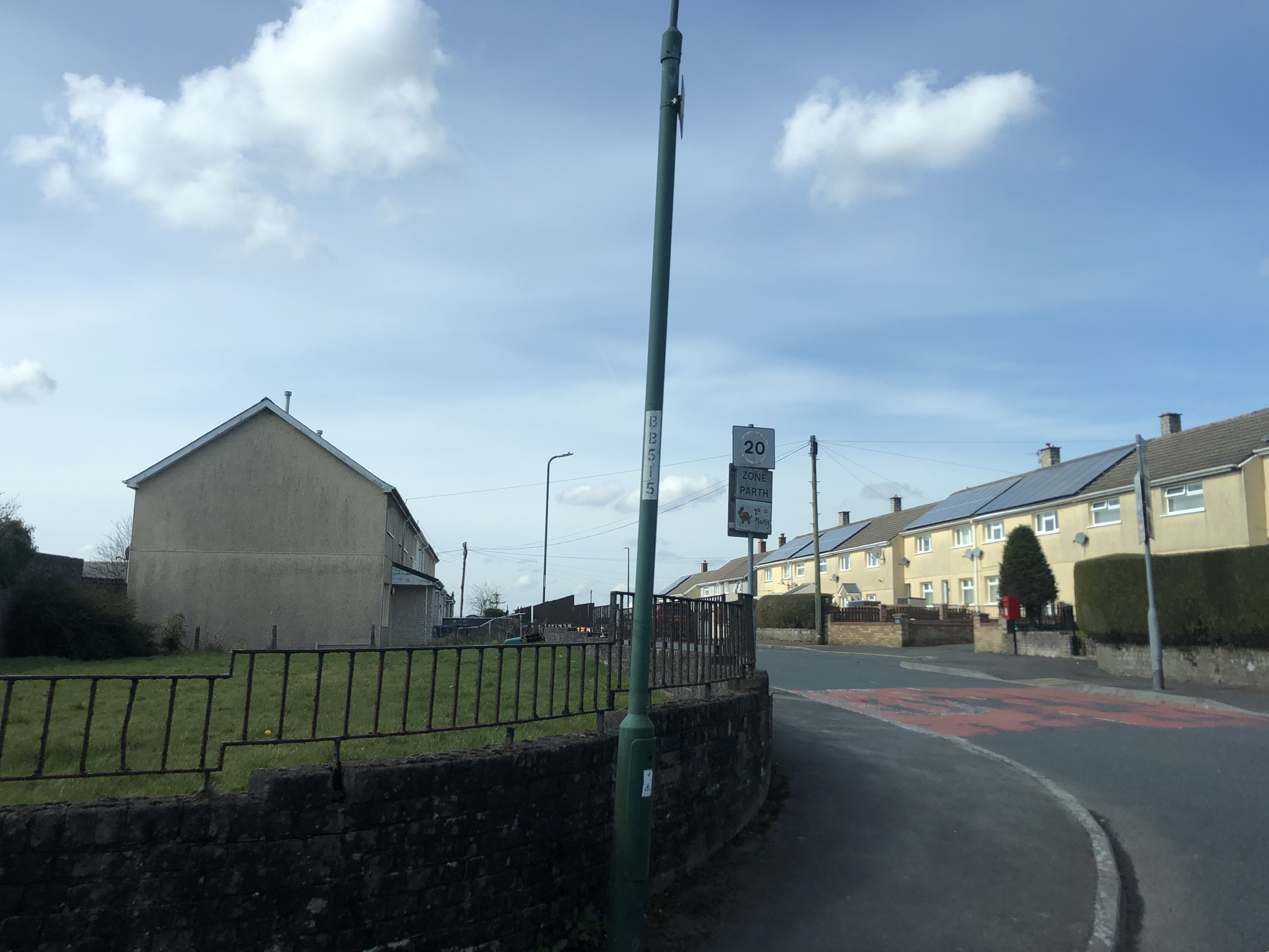

- Location within Blaenau Gwent
- Population: 467
- Principal area: Blaenau Gwent
- Preserved county: Gwent
- Country: Wales
- Sovereign state: United Kingdom
- Police: Gwent
- Fire: South Wales
- Ambulance: Welsh
- UK Parliament: Blaenau Gwent and Rhymney
- Senedd Cymru – Welsh Parliament: Blaenau Gwent
- List of places UK Wales Blaenau Gwent 51.804°N 3.210°W Map of the community

Garnlydan is a village near Ebbw Vale, in Blaenau Gwent, Wales. Since 2021 it has been a community, split from parts of Beaufort. In the past it was in the Brecknockshire parish of Llangattock.

Garnlydan Primary School was set to close in 2009. However protests stopped these plans. In 2010 the school was again scheduled to close.

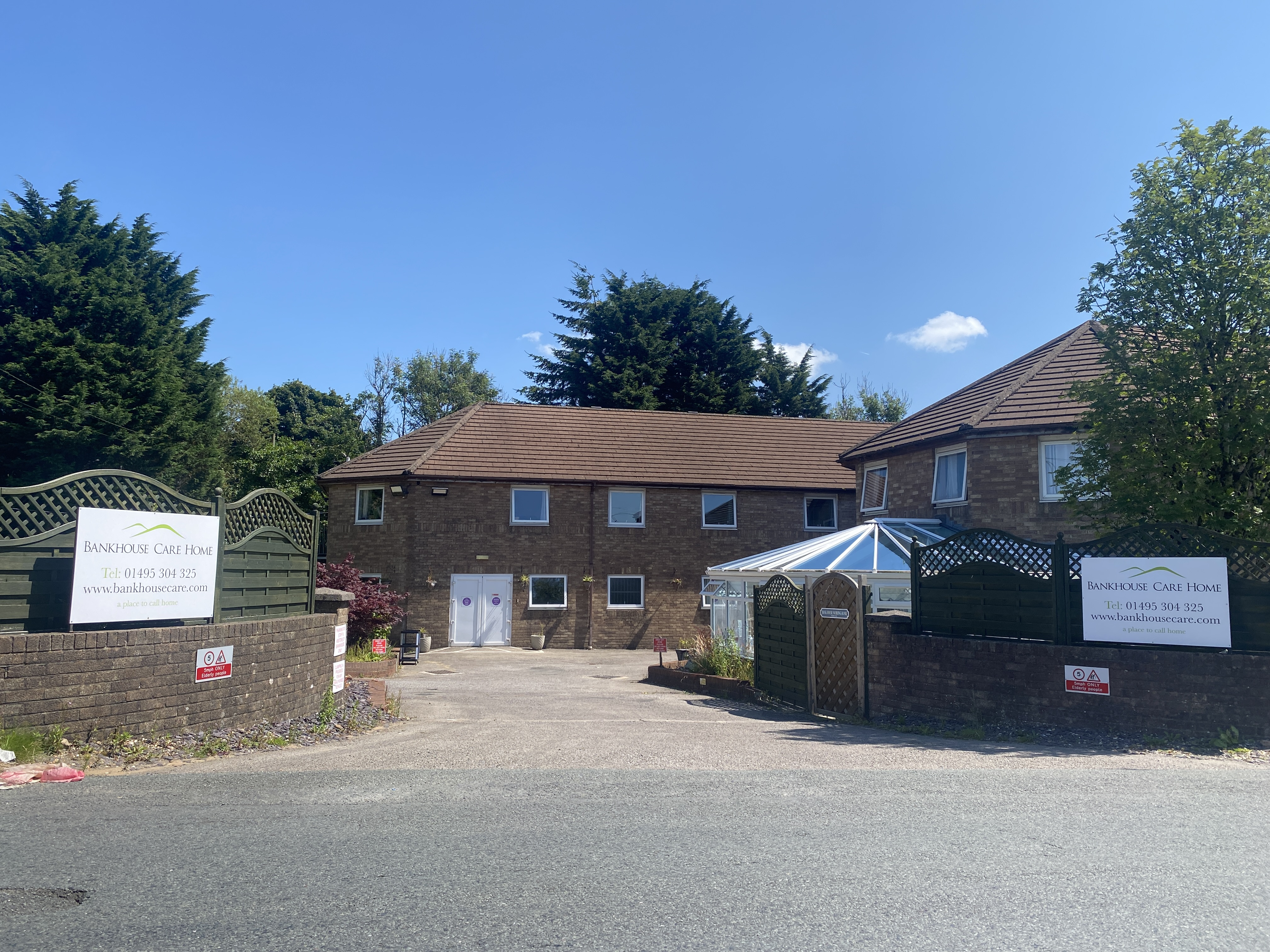
