= Brynithel =

Coordinates: 51.70378°N 3.13955°W

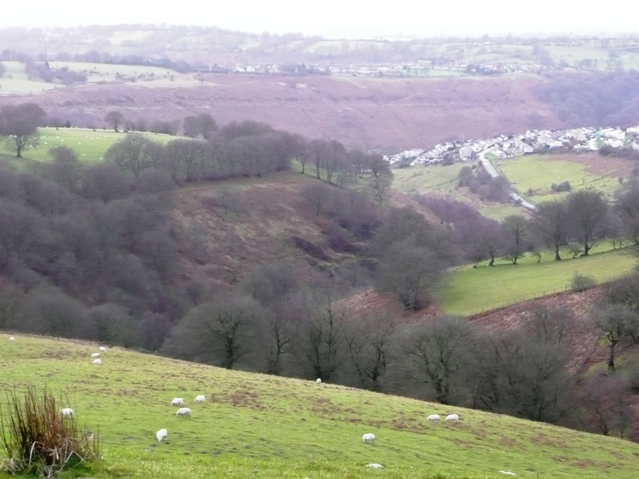
- Cwm Cyffin with the houses of Brynithel visible in the distance

- Location within Blaenau Gwent
- OS grid reference: SO213011
- Community: Llanhilleth
- Principal area: Blaenau Gwent
- Preserved county: Blaenau Gwent
- Country: Wales
- Sovereign state: United Kingdom
- Post town: ABERTILLERY
- Postcode district: NP13
- Dialling code: 01495
- Police: Gwent
- Fire: South Wales
- Ambulance: Welsh
- UK Parliament: Blaenau Gwent and Rhymney
- Senedd Cymru – Welsh Parliament: Blaenau Gwent

Brynithel is a village in the Ebbw Valley in Blaenau Gwent. It belongs in the community of Llanhilleth.

It is located 1.79 miles (2.88 km) south of Abertillery and 10.09 miles (16.24 km) north of Newport. The B4471 runs near to the village.

The River Ebbw flows past the west of the village.

== Village today ==
Facilities in Brynithel include Brynithel Community Centre, a convenience store, a playground, a Welsh Government funded Flying Start hub, a play area called The Eden Centre, an ATM, and the Mount Pleasant Inn.

A nearby proposal for a sandstone mine has been reported by newspapers locally after a number of unsuccessful planning applications since 2006. The landowner made further attempts in 2011.

== Transport ==
The village is a 22-minute walk, and 0.9 miles (1.4 km) from Llanhilleth railway station.

The town is served by the number 1 bus between Six Bells and Abertillery, and the nearby Rugby Club stop provides connections to Stagecoach South Wales services:

- 62 (Ebbw Vale-Cwmbran)
- X15 (Newport-Brynmawr)
- X1 (Cwmbran-Brynmawr and Pontypool)
- 95B (Newbridge)

== Governance ==
The Llanhilleth electoral ward serves the village. The ward is represented by Councillors Norman Lee Parsons (Llanhilleth, Ind), Hedley McCarthy (Llanhilleth, Lab), and Joanne Collins (Llanhilleth, Ind).

The area is represented in the Senedd by Alun Davies (Labour) and the Member of Parliament is Nick Smith (Labour).

== Sport ==
The village is best known for the local rugby club, Brynithel RFC, which is a member of the Welsh Rugby Union and a feeder club for the Dragons.

Brynithel Recreational Ground is also the home of Llanhilleth Athletic AFC. The football club made the move from Llanhilleth Park towards the end of the 2019/2020 before the season was ended early due to the Coronavirus outbreak.
