= List of schools in Blaenau Gwent =

This is a list of schools in Blaenau Gwent in Wales.

== Primary schools ==
- All Saints RC Primary School
- Beaufort Hill Primary School
- Blaenycwm Primary School
- Brynbach Primary School
- Brynmawr RC Primary School
- Coed Y Garn Primary School
- Cwm Primary School
- Deighton Primary School
- Georgetown Primary School
- Glanhowy Primary School
- Glyncoed Primary School
- Rhos Y Fedwen Primary School
- Roseheyworth Millennium Primary School
- St Illtyds Primary School
- St Joseph's RC Primary School
- St Mary's CW Primary School
- Sofryd Primary School
- Willowtown Primary School
- Ysgol Gymraeg Bro Helyg
- Ystruth Primary School

== Secondary schools ==
- Abertillery Learning Community
- Brynmawr Foundation School
- Ebbw Fawr Learning Community
- Tredegar Comprehensive School

== Special and alternative provision schools ==
- Abertillery Learning Community - special resource base attached at secondary and primary school campuses
- Ebbw Fawr Learning Community - ASD base attached at secondary and primary school campuses
- Pen-Y-Cwm Special School, Ebbw Vale - age range: 3-19
- The River Centre PRU, Tredegar (primary) - Ebbw Vale (secondary)
