= Ashvale, Blaenau Gwent =

Coordinates: 51.78°N 03.26°W

Ashvale: Welsh: Pantygerdinen
- Location within Blaenau Gwent
- OS grid reference: SO1310
- Community: Tredegar
- Principal area: Blaenau Gwent
- Preserved county: Gwent
- Country: Wales
- Sovereign state: United Kingdom
- Post town: TREDEGAR
- Postcode district: NP22
- Dialling code: 01495
- Police: Gwent
- Fire: South Wales
- Ambulance: Welsh
- UK Parliament: Blaenau Gwent and Rhymney
- Senedd Cymru – Welsh Parliament: Blaenau Gwent

Ashvale (Welsh: Pantygerdinen) is a village in Blaenau Gwent, south Wales (within the historic boundaries of Monmouthshire).
