= Tafarnaubach =

Village in Blaenau Gwent, Wales

Coordinates: 51.787°N 3.276°W

Tafarnaubach: Welsh: Tafarnau-bach
- Location within Blaenau Gwent
- OS grid reference: SO121106
- Community: Tredegar
- Principal area: Blaenau Gwent
- Preserved county: Gwent
- Country: Wales
- Sovereign state: United Kingdom
- Post town: TREDEGAR
- Postcode district: NP22
- Dialling code: 01495
- Police: Gwent
- Fire: South Wales
- Ambulance: Welsh
- UK Parliament: Blaenau Gwent and Rhymney

Tafarnaubach is a village on the Sirhowy River in the county borough of Blaenau Gwent, in south-east Wales. Located within the historic boundaries of Monmouthshire, it lies about two miles west of Tredegar town centre.

== Geography ==
To the south of the village lies a small country park, Parc Bryn Bach, while the northern part of the district is dominated by the Tafarnaubach Industrial Estate. The village is overlooked by Mynydd Llangynidr mountain, which in the late 19th century was infamous for illegal bare-knuckle boxing mountain fights due to its proximity to three county borders.

== Economy ==
Tafarnaubach Industrial Estate is a major employer in the area with companies including Able Office Furniture, Airspace Solutions, Atal UK, Basement Waterproofing Services (UK), BioExtractions (Wales), Dragon Recycling Europe, M&J Europe, NMC (UK), Nordic Care Services, PCI Pharma Services (Penn Pharmaceuticals), Tenneco-Walker (UK), and Waldron Commercials based at the site. Also nearby is Ron Skinner & Sons, car dealers of Tredegar.

== Transport ==
The Rhymney railway station is a 50-minute walk (2.2 miles (3.5 km)) from the village, and is also served by the 20 bus between Tredegar and Rhymney which stops in the village.

Rhymney Station is a 7-minute bus journey while Tredegar is a 13-minute bus journey from the village.
