= Badminton, Blaenau Gwent =

Badminton
- Location within Blaenau Gwent
- Population: 3,110
- Principal area: Blaenau Gwent
- Preserved county: Gwent
- Country: Wales
- Sovereign state: United Kingdom
- Post town: EBBW VALE
- Postcode district: NP23
- Dialling code: 01495
- Police: Gwent
- Fire: South Wales
- Ambulance: Welsh
- UK Parliament: Blaenau Gwent and Rhymney
- Senedd Cymru – Welsh Parliament: Blaenau Gwent
- List of places UK Wales Blaenau Gwent 51.791°N 3.212°W Map of the community

Badminton is a community and electoral ward in Blaenau Gwent, Wales, with the community being created in 2010.

== Community ==
The community of Badminton was created from part of the larger community of Beaufort in 2010 following The Blaenau Gwent (Communities) Order 2010. The community includes the Newchurch and Glyncoed area of Ebbw Vale (including Badminton Grove) and the area to the west surrounding Bryn-serth Road. The Rassau and (new) Beaufort communities lie to the north, with Ebbw Vale North immediately to the south. The Ebbw Fawr river flows through Glyncoed in the eastern half of the community.

The boundaries of the Badminton community are coterminous with the electoral ward of the same name. According to the 2011 census the population of the Badminton ward was 3,110 (with 556 under the age of 18).

Badminton has only one listed building in the area, namely Church House, a mid 19th-century two storey building which was probably contemporary to the (now demolished) St John's Church.

The Aneurin Bevan Memorial Stones are within the community boundaries (in the Beaufort electoral ward). Three smaller stones (representing the three towns of his constituency, Ebbw Vale, Rhymney and Tredegar) surround a larger stone representing Bevan.

== Governance ==
Badminton is in the Blaenau Gwent and Rhymney parliamentary constituency for elections to the UK parliament and Blaenau Gwent for elections to the Welsh Senedd.

The Badminton ward elects two county councillors to Blaenau Gwent County Borough Council. At the May 2017 elections the ward elected two Independent councillors, Clive Meredith and Gregory Paulsen. Paulsen took a seat from the Labour Party and helped the Independents win a majority on the county council.
