= Quantick =

Quantick is a surname. Notable people with the surname include:

- David Quantick (born 1961), English novelist, comedy writer, and critic
  - Bussmann and Quantick Kingsize, a radio show featuring David Quantick and Jane Bussmann
- John Quantick (1909–1972), Welsh footballer
