= Badminton (disambiguation) =

Badminton is a racquet sport played by two opposing players or two opposing pairs.

Badminton may also refer to:

- Badminton, Blaenau Gwent, a community in Wales
- Badminton, Gloucestershire, a village in England giving its name to
  - Badminton House, the estate of the Duke of Beaufort in Gloucestershire
  - Badminton Horse Trials, the three-day event
- Badminton School in Bristol, England
- Badminton (album), the 2003 album by breakcore artist Venetian Snares
- Badmingtons, a punk rock band from the Republic of Macedonia
- The Badminton Library, a series of books on sport from the turn of the twentieth century
