= Georgetown, Blaenau Gwent =

Coordinates: 51.76585°N 3.238354°W

Georgetown
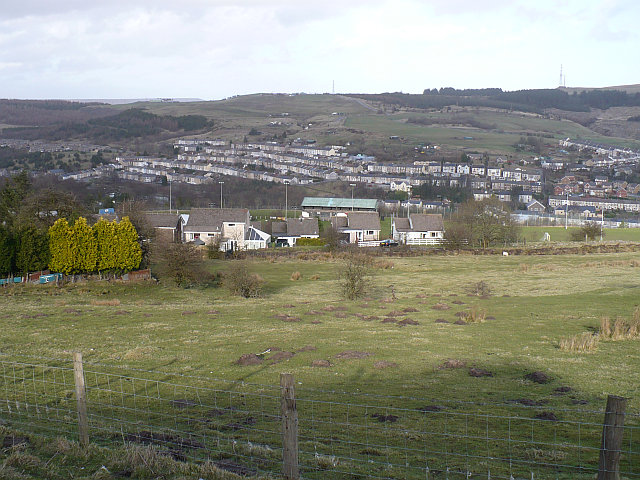
- View towards Georgetown Taken from Park Hill near Cefn Golau

- Location within Blaenau Gwent
- Population: 3,410 (2011)
- OS grid reference: SO146081
- Community: Tredegar
- Principal area: Blaenau Gwent
- Preserved county: Blaenau Gwent
- Country: Wales
- Sovereign state: United Kingdom
- Post town: TREDEGAR
- Postcode district: NP22
- Dialling code: 01495
- Police: Gwent
- Fire: South Wales
- Ambulance: Welsh
- UK Parliament: Blaenau Gwent and Rhymney
- Senedd Cymru – Welsh Parliament: Blaenau Gwent

Georgetown is a village in the Sirhowy Valley in Blaenau Gwent. It belongs in the ward of Georgetown.

It is located 0.59 miles (0.95 km) south of Tredegar and 1.42 miles (2.29 km) west of Ebbw Vale. It is 16.17 miles (26.02 km) north of Newport. The A4048 runs near to the village. The population of the ward is 3,410 which represents the whole Georgetown ward.

== Village today ==
Facilities in Georgetown include a Community Centre, a Gospel Hall, a Methodist church, a congressional Church, Rhyd Hall pub, a Chinese restaurant, and a small supermarket. The area is covered by Georgetown Primary School and Tredegar Comprehensive School. The Tredegar Leisure Centre is nearby as well as the World War I memorial site. The Sirhowy River runs adjacent to the village.

In 2019 the town received National Lottery Charitable funding for a not-for-profit outlet providing low income families in the community with re-purposed clothing, toiletries, and toys worth £8,780.

== Transport ==
The village is a 12-minute walk, and 0.6 miles (0.97 km) from Tredegar where Tredegar bus station offers services to Ebbw Vale Town railway station as well as buses to Newport, and local villages.

The town is on the route between Newport and Ebbw Vale/Tredegar which provides connections to Stagecoach South Wales services:

- 97 (Ebbw Vale)
- 56 (Newport-Tredegar)
- 97 (Ebbw Vale)
- E11 (Ebbw Vale)

== Governance ==
The Georgetown electoral ward serves the village. The ward is represented by Councillors John C Morgan (Georgetown, Lab) and Keith Hayden (Georgetown, Lab).

The area is represented in the Senedd by Alun Davies (Labour) and the Member of Parliament is Nick Smith (Labour).
