= 2012 Blaenau Gwent County Borough Council election =

2012 Welsh local government election

Result of the 2012 Blaenau Gwent County Borough Council election

The 2012 Blaenau Gwent Borough Council election took place on 3 May 2012 to elect members of Blaenau Gwent Council in Wales. This was on the same day as the other 2012 United Kingdom local elections. The previous council election took place in 2008 and the following election was held in 2017.

Labour won majority control of the council after gaining 16 seats. The Liberal Democrats and Blaenau Gwent People's Voice, who had both won seats in the 2008 elections, did not contest any wards in 2012 and thus lost all their seats.

Blaenau Gwent Council Election 2012
Party	Seats	Gains	Losses	Net gain/loss	Seats %	Votes %	Votes	+/−
Labour	33			+16	78.6	55.0	11,345	+24.5
Independent	9			-9	21.4	41.4	8,723	+5.5
Plaid Cymru	0			0	0.0	1.5	315	-0.5
BNP	0			0	0.0	0.7	151	+0.2
Conservative	0			0	0.0	0.4	89	-0.4
Blaenau Gwent PV	-	-	-	-5	-	-	-	-22.4
Liberal Democrats	-	-	-	-2	-	-	-	-7.0
