= Joseph Edward Crawshay Partridge =

South Africa international rugby union footballer

Birdie Partridge
- Born: Joseph Edward Crawshay Partridge; 21 July 1879 Llanthewy Court, Abergavenny, Wales
- Died: 28 August 1965 (aged 86)
- School: Dulwich College
- Occupation: Professional Soldier

Rugby union career
- Position: Forward
Amateur team(s)
Years	Team	Apps	(Points)
1907–10	Army		
Senior career
Years	Team	Apps	(Points)
1898–1901	Newport RFC	162	
1905–06	Blackheath F.C.		
- London Welsh
1899–1902	Pretoria Quins		
1904–11	Newport RFC		
1905–15	Barbarians	17	
Provincial / State sides
Years	Team	Apps	(Points)
1902–03	Transvaal		
International career
Years	Team	Apps	(Points)
1903	South Africa	1	
1915	Barbarians	1	

Lieutenant-colonel Joseph Edward Crawshay Partridge (21 July 1879 – 28 August 1965) known as "The Bird" or "Birdie", was a Welsh born British Army officer and international rugby union player who was capped for South Africa and was a member of the Barbarians in that side's first international, played against Wales in 1915. He was also the founder of the Army Rugby Union.

== Early life ==
Joseph Edward Crawshay Partridge was born 21 July 1879 in Llanthewy Court, Monmouth, near Abergavenny. He was the eldest son of Joseph Partridge (born Beaufort House, Beaufort, Monmouth 1843) and his wife Jessie (née James, born 1846 on the border near Kington Herefordshire). He had three younger brothers. His cousin, war hero, Richard Crawshay Bailey Partridge shared his Crawshay middle name. Their Suffolk-born grandfather, William Partridge, ironmaster, manager of the Beaufort Ironworks who married locally born Charlotte Bevan, was the son of Elizabeth Bailey, sister of Crawshay Bailey and Joseph Bailey.

He was sent to school at the English public school, Dulwich College, where he learnt his rugby. The school had a strong rugby tradition having already produced a number of international players by the time Partridge attended.

== Military career ==
Partridge was commissioned an officer in the Royal Monmouthshire Royal Engineers, a Militia regiment, where he was promoted to lieutenant on 14 March 1901. He saw active service in South Africa during the Second Boer War. After the war ended in June 1902, he returned to the United Kingdom on the SS Syria two months later, arriving in Southampton in early September.

He transferred to the regular British Army with a commission as a second lieutenant in the Welch Regiment on 28 January 1903. His later career included service in the First World War. He was mentioned in despatches for his part in that conflict, and eventually promoted to lieutenant-colonel.

== Rugby career ==
After leaving Dulwich, he went on to play for Newport RFC. His commitments with the Welch Regiment took him away from his homeland, however, and as a lieutenant he was sent to South Africa to fight in the Boer War. Whilst serving there, he joined the Pretoria Harlequins and latterly the provincial side, Transvaal, later to be renamed the Golden Lions. He even represented South Africa after the war in 1903 in one of the three tests against a touring British XV, who are retrospectively considered as the 1903 British Lions.

After he returned to the United Kingdom, whilst continuing to serve in the Army, he played club rugby for Blackheath and London Welsh captaining the former in the 1906 season. He also played for the Welch Regiment, the Army (caps 1907, 1908, 1909, 1910), and had an English trial.

Partridge also had the distinction of playing for the famed invitational side, The Barbarians. He had the honour of being chosen to play in their first international match. Captained by Edgar Mobbs, the match was played to raise funds for the war effort. Ironically, the match was played against Wales which meant that Joseph Edward Crawshay Partridge's only appearance in a Welsh international fixture was as a member of the opposition.

=== Formation of the Army Rugby Union ===
The idea of forming the Army Rugby Union, came to him whilst he was reading a newspaper on a train during a tour of Scotland with Blackheath RFC in the season 1905–06. He proposed his idea to his two travelling companions and teammates, Lieutenant WSD Craven of the Royal Field Artillery and Lieutenant CG Liddell (who later become General Sir Clive Liddell) of the Leicestershire Regiment. Having their support, a meeting was held on 12 November 1906 at which it was decided to form an Army Rugby Union (ARU). Captain REG Waymouth, having been appointed Honorary Secretary, duly wrote to the Army Council to obtain sanction for its formation and on 31 December 1906 sanction was granted.

=== International matches played ===
- for South Africa
  - (United Kingdom) Great Britain, Johannesburg, 26 August 1903. Draw (South Africa (10) 10 - 10 (5) Great Britain)
- for Barbarians
  - Wales, Cardiff Arms Park on 17 April 1915. Barbarians won 26 - 10

== Later life ==
After his retirement he remained in Abergavenny where he lived until his death in 1965 at the age of 86. His South Africa rugby cap was presented to the Regimental Museum in Cardiff.

== Personal life ==
Major Joseph Edward Crawshay Partridge married Christine Mary Phillips of the famous brewing family Phillips & Sons Brewery.
