= Abertillery Learning Community =

Coordinates: 51.735222°N 3.134778°W

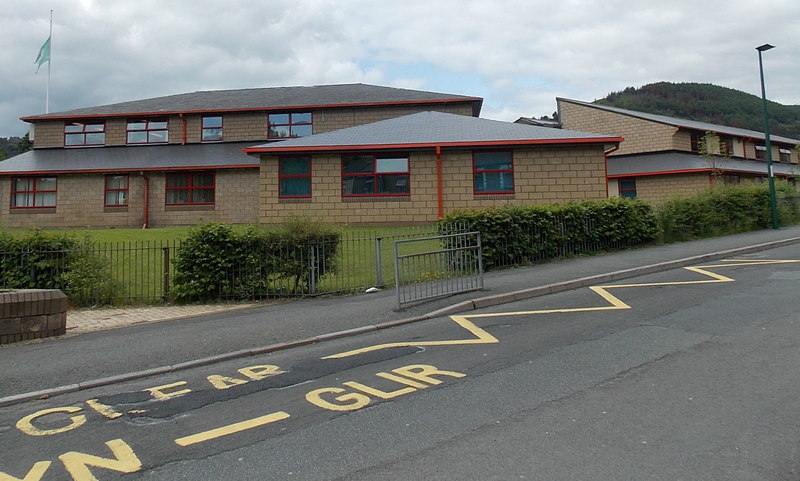
- The secondary campus

Location
- Alma Street; Abertillery, Blaenau Gwent, NP13 1YL; Wales

Information
- Established: 1986
- Local authority: Blaenau Gwent
- Department for Education URN: 402378 Tables
- Gender: Co-educational
- Age range: 3–16
- Enrolment: 1655
- Website: abertillery3-16.co.uk

Abertillery Learning Community is an all-through school in Abertillery, Wales.

The school was formed by merging several schools in 2016. Abertillery Comprehensive School was originally opened in 1986, on a former colliery site. This school was merged with four local primary schools.

As of 2020, the school's most recent Estyn inspection was in 2018, with a judgement that the school needs significant improvement.

In 2019, the school was undergoing a review of teaching, with some posts likely to be cut; at this point the school had had three headteachers in two years.

== List of campuses ==
- Secondary Campus - Abertillery Learning Community
- Tillery Street Primary Campus
- Roseheyworth Road Millenium Primary Campus
- Six Bells Primary Campus

=== Former campuses ===
- Queen Street Primary Campus
- Bryngwyn Road Primary Campus
