= 2008 Blaenau Gwent County Borough Council election =

2008 Welsh local government election

Result of the 2008 Blaenau Gwent County Borough Council election

The 2008 Blaenau Gwent County Borough Council election took place on 1 May 2008 to elect members of Blaenau Gwent County Borough Council, the council of Blaenau Gwent in Wales. This was on the same day as the other 2008 United Kingdom local elections. The previous council election took place in 2004 and the following election was held in 2012.

In the election, the Labour Party lost control of the council to no overall control. The Blaenau Gwent People's Voice gained 5 seats.

== Results ==
Party	Seats	Change
Independent	18	▲11
Labour	17	▼15
People's Voice	5	▲5
Liberal Democrats	2	▼1

== See also ==
- 2008 Welsh local elections
