= Sirhowy =

Coordinates: 51.782990°N 3.246011°W

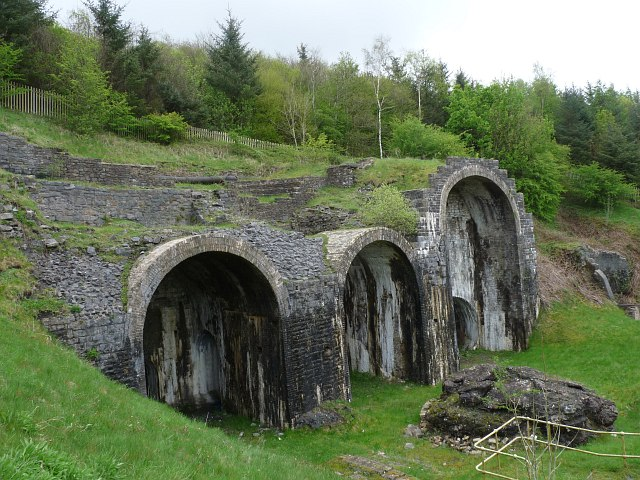
- The remnants of the Sirhowy Ironworks

- Location within Blaenau Gwent
- OS grid reference: SO144101
- Community: Tredegar
- Principal area: Blaenau Gwent
- Preserved county: Blaenau Gwent
- Country: Wales
- Sovereign state: United Kingdom
- Post town: TREDEGAR
- Postcode district: NP22
- Dialling code: 01495
- Police: Gwent
- Fire: South Wales
- Ambulance: Welsh
- UK Parliament: Blaenau Gwent and Rhymney
- Senedd Cymru – Welsh Parliament: Blaenau Gwent

Sirhowy (Welsh: Sirhywi) is a village in the Sirhowy Valley (Welsh: Glyn Sirhywi) and the county of Blaenau Gwent in South East Wales. It is located 0.83 miles (1.34 km) north east of Tredegar, 1.44 miles (2.32 km) north west of Ebbw Vale, and 16.73 miles (26.92 km) north west of Newport. The Sirhowy River flows past the west of the village, while the A4048 runs near it.

== History ==
=== The toponymy of Sirhowy ===
Tredegar-born historian Oliver Jones (1969) discussed the toponymy of Sirhowy:

'At different times the name has been rendered as Sirhowey, Sirowi, Sroway and Sirowy, all of which stem from the poets, lease-writers and map-makers of the past. The uncertainty of its spelling is clearly shown as early as 1590 in an old document connected with the Manor of Abercarn in which reference is made to "the land called Rue Cam y Boulthe in the place called Glynne Sirowy on the east side of the stream called Sirowye. ... "Sirhowy" in the opinion of Eiddil Gwent, the first of our local historians, is derived from Siriol Gwy, "siriol" meaning pleasant or charming and "gwy" an old Welsh word for water - the name meaning Pleasant Water.'

English historian and archdeacon William Coxe cited 'Sorwy' six times in his 1801 book 'Historical Tour of Monmouthshire'. In his last citation he referred to 'the banks of the Sorwy'. Like Coxe, Jones observed that 'References taken from many sources show [the original name] to be Sorwy'. However Jones also observed that 'many different spellings' existed, which he attributed to the English writers who had difficulties in pronouncing the name.

In his 1971 'History of Ebbw Vale', Ebbw Vale-born Arthur Gray-Jones added a different slant to the origin of the name 'Sirhowy'. Having complimented the 1969 'Early Years [sic] of Sirhowy and Tredegar' by Jones as 'admirable', he documented that 'the highest reaches of the Monmouthshire valleys were formerly known as the "Wilds"' and that the 'oldest local names date from [an] early Celtic period'. Finally he cited as an example of a local name, 'Sirhowy - Sorwydd or perhaps Siriolwydd - sor, sullen or siriol, cheerful stream.'

=== The Ironworks ===
Academic historian John Edward Lloyd documented that the Revd. Henry Burgh of Monmouth succeeded to what he described as 'the Sirhowy lands (with other considerable property)' upon the death of his father, John Burgh of Troy (near Monmouth) and that, in 1778, his son, Charles Henry Burgh, granted a lease to John Sealy and Bolton Hudson, grocers and teamen of the City of London, and Thomas Atkinson a merchant of Skipton in Yorkshire, and William Barrow, a grocer and teaman also from the City of London:

'to build such and so many Furnaces, Forges, Foundries, Mills, Engines, Storehouses, buildings, etc., for the placing and keeping of ore, coal, and charcoal for the making and manufacturing of iron, as the said John Sealy and others may think convenient.'

Of the partners, only Atkinson seems to have had experience in iron manufacturing. Jones (1969) described him as 'the leading partner'. Gray-Jones (1971) essentially explained why. He described Atkinson as being 'an experienced ironmaster', 'having been producing iron near Ulverston in N. Lancashire'.

Local historian Philip Prosser (1990) documented that (having been granted a lease) the leaseholders built an iron furnace to meet 'the demand for iron for munitions [for] the Seven Years War of 1756-1763 and the American War of Independence 1775-1783'. A flurry of legal documents followed which were signed by various parties. Initially, in 1794, with only Barrow remaining from the leaseholders, 'Articles of Agreement' were entered into between him and the Rev. Matthew Monkhouse of Monmouth and Richard Fothergill of Clapham, London, who Lloyd described as being 'joint proprietors of the Sirhowy Iron Works' operated the ironworks.

Until the end of 1817, Fothwergill and Monkhouse held the lease for the property. Then, by 1818, James Harford of Harford, Partridge and Co. of Ebbw Vale had bought 'all the ownership rights of the Sirhowy Company', which then comprised 'three blast furnaces, collieries and iron ore mines'. However, by 1877 the works was overproducing iron. Consequently it was partly demolished. Nevertheless it continued to produce coke until 1905.

The ironworks are of regional and national significance, and are well preserved. The remains of the site include the three masonry arches, furnace base, waterwheel tunnel, and other earthworks. It is a scheduled monument listed by Coflein and Visit Wales and is open to visitors.

== Governance ==
Sirhowy is covered by an electoral ward of the same name, however this covers a far larger area to the northwest of the village. The population of the ward in 2011 was 5,630. The ward's Councillors are Brian Thomas (Ind, Sirhowy), Malcolm Cross (Lab, Sirhowy), and Tommy Smith (Lab, Sirhowy). The area is represented in the Senedd by Alun Davies (Labour) and the Member of Parliament is Nick Smith (Labour).

== Facilities ==
Facilities in Sirhowy include a Tai Calon Community Housing centre named Star Centre, Welsh Government funded Flying Start hub, one pub, one restaurant, an IndyCube co-working space, and two garages. The Gwent Heritage voluntary group has extensively documented the history of the area as far back as its mining establishment. The group's branch meets regularly to contribute to the collection of materials covering the region.

The village was previously served by the defunct Sirhowy railway station. The village is now a 40-minute walk 2.2 miles (3.5 km) from Ebbw Vale Town railway station. Services run to and from Cardiff Central from the village. In 2021 services will also run to Newport. The village is served by three bus services: the 'X4' (Cardiff to Brynmawr/Abergavenny), the 'E11' (Ebbw Vale to Tredegar) and the '97' (Ebbw Vale to Peacehaven).

== Tourism ==
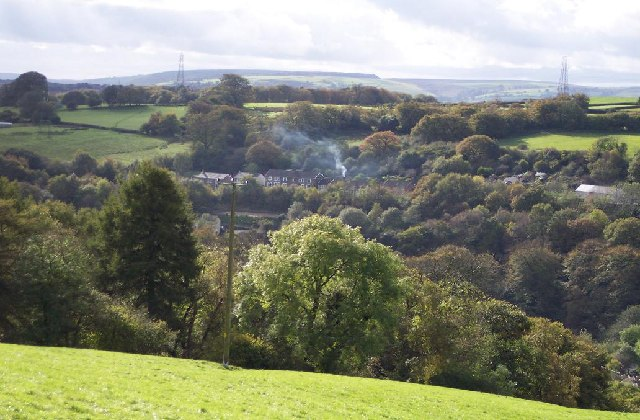
Pen-deri farm and the hamlet of Gwrhay taken from on the Sirhowy Valley Walk climbing up from Argoed.

The Sirhowy Valley Rridgeway Walk is available to walkers. The Sirhowy area is popular with rock climbers because the geology of the area offers 'one of the best chunks of quarried sandstone in the area'. The magazine 'UK Climbing' describe this as providing a 'brilliant line-up of fingery wall climbs' and 'plenty of excellent (slightly) easier climbing on some of the best rock around.'
