= John Quantick =

Welsh footballer

Personal information
- Full name: John Henry Quantick
- Date of birth: 6 July 1909
- Place of birth: Cwm, Wales
- Date of death: 1972 (aged 62–63)
- Height: 5 ft 11 1/2 in (1.82 m)
- Position: Right-back

Senior career*
Years	Team	Apps	(Gls)
- Ebbw Vale
1930–?	West Bromwich Albion	0	(0)
- Dudley Town
1933–1937	Hull City	88	(1)
- Worcester City
- * Club domestic league appearances and goals

John Henry Quantick (6 July 1909 – 1972) was a Welsh football right-back. He was born in Cwm.

Quantick signed for West Bromwich Albion in 1930 from Ebbw Vale, but left to join Dudley Town without making his league debut. In 1933 he joined Hull City where he played 88 league games before leaving to join Worcester City.
