= Ebbw Vale South =

Coordinates: 51°46′34″N 3°12′17″W

- Community
- Location within Blaenau Gwent
- Principal area: Blaenau Gwent
- Country: Wales
- Sovereign state: United Kingdom
- Police: Gwent
- Fire: South Wales
- Ambulance: Welsh
- List of places UK Wales Blaenau Gwent Map of the community

Ebbw Vale South (Welsh: De Glynebwy) is a community and electoral ward in Blaenau Gwent, South Wales, including the south of the town of Ebbw Vale.

It was formed in 2010 from part of that community. The population in 2011 was 4,274.

== Governance ==
Ebbw Vale South is also an electoral ward, coterminous with the community, which elects two councillors to Blaenau Gwent County Borough Council.

A few days after being elected as an independent councillor for the ward at the 2022 local election, Carl Bainton caused some controversy by changing his allegiance to Labour. The ward was subsequently represented by two Labour councillors.
