= Cwmtillery =

Coordinates: 51.7426°N 3.1383°W

Cwmtillery: Welsh: Cwmtyleri
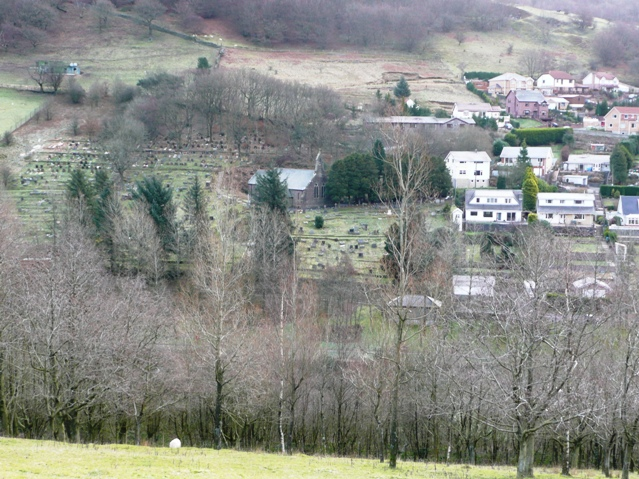
- St Paul's church on the edge of Cwmtillery

- Location within Blaenau Gwent
- Population: 4,703
- OS grid reference: SO215055
- Principal area: Blaenau Gwent
- Preserved county: Gwent
- Country: Wales
- Sovereign state: United Kingdom
- Post town: ABERTILLERY
- Postcode district: NP13
- Dialling code: 01495
- Police: Gwent
- Fire: South Wales
- Ambulance: Welsh
- UK Parliament: Blaenau Gwent and Rhymney
- Senedd Cymru – Welsh Parliament: Blaenau Gwent

Cwmtillery (/ˌkʊmtɪˈlɛəri/; from Welsh Cwmtyleri) (population 2011. 4800) is a ward of Abertillery. Located within the historic boundaries of Monmouthshire, it is part of the administrative area of the county borough of Blaenau Gwent, Wales.

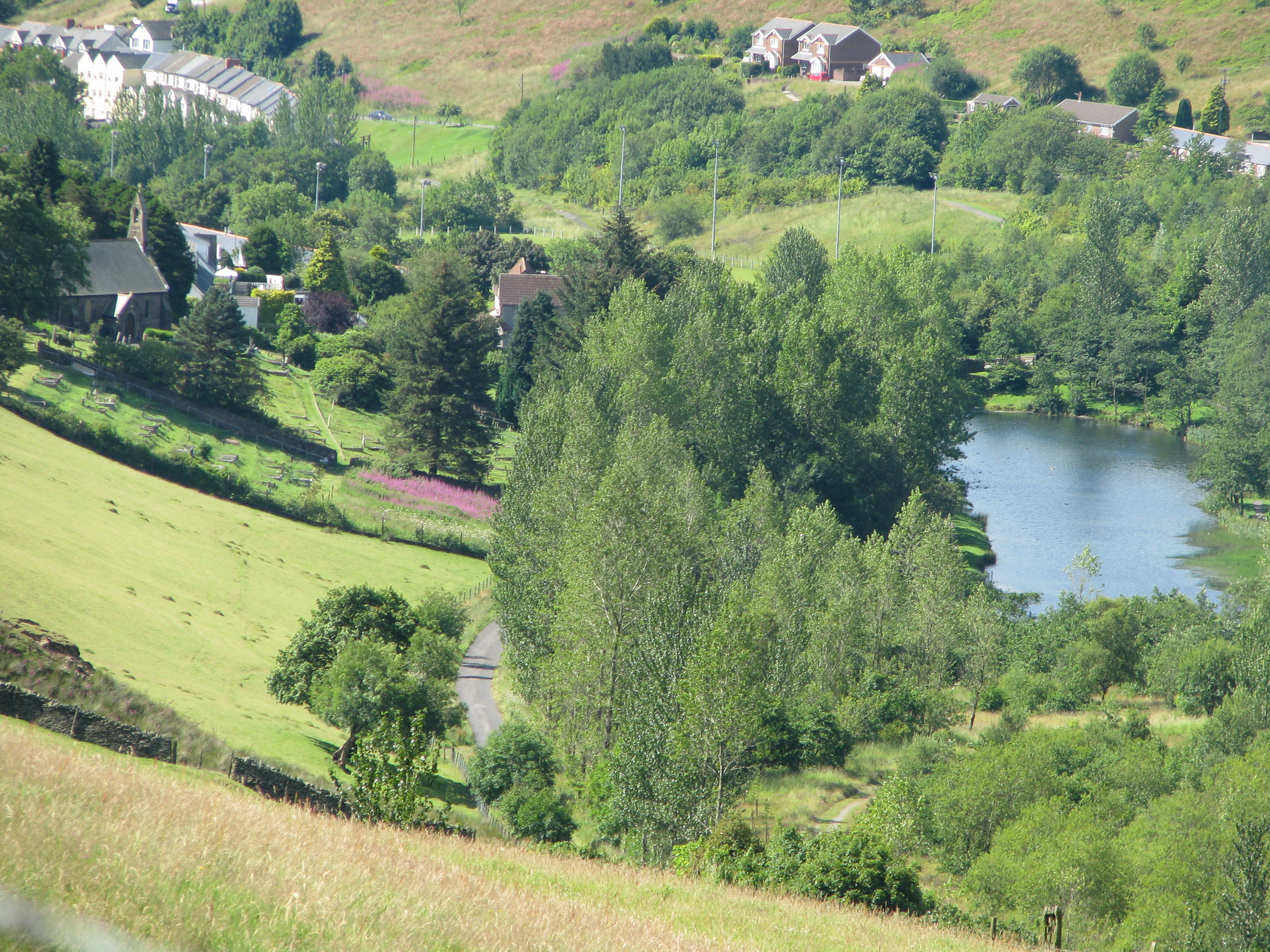
St Paul's overlooking lower Cwmtillery lake

== Etymology ==
The name of the ward means "the valley of the River Tyleri". Tyleri probably derives from a personal name.

== History ==
Located within a narrow valley formed by the River Tyleri, the area now known as Cwmtillery was once wholly a picturesque woodland area based beneath the heights of the local hill 'Gwastad' (551m) to the east and Mynydd James (550m)to the north. The area was mentioned by English historian William Coxe as "Well peopled, richly wooded and highly cultivated, almost rivalling the fertile counties of England".

During the 1840s, Thomas Brown acquired the rights to sink a mine shaft at the site of a farm known as Tir Nicholas, in the hope of reaching the 'Elled' coal seam. The shaft was sunk to a depth of 130 yards and the colliery set up was originally known as Tir Nicholas Colliery, and later the South Wales Colliery. The mine changed hands in 1852, with John Russell taking ownership. Russell increased the original shafts and deepened the mine to 240 yards. The mine had a long history, closing in 1982; but also suffered several disasters, with four underground explosions between 1857 and 1876. The two worst disasters were in 1857 which saw the deaths of 13 miners, and the 1876 explosion which killed 16 men and boys.

The Church of St Paul was constructed in the Early English style during 1890 and opened for worship in January 1891, initially as a daughter church of the parish of Abertillery. A distinct parish of Cwmtillery was set up in 1923.

Singer Tom Jones (then known as Tom Woodward) was first spotted and signed for a recording deal in the early 1960s at the Top Hat club in Woodland Terrace, Cwmtillery. The club burnt down in 2011.

Cwmtillery was the principal location for the cult experimental feature film The Other Side of the Underneath (1972) written and directed by Jane Arden.

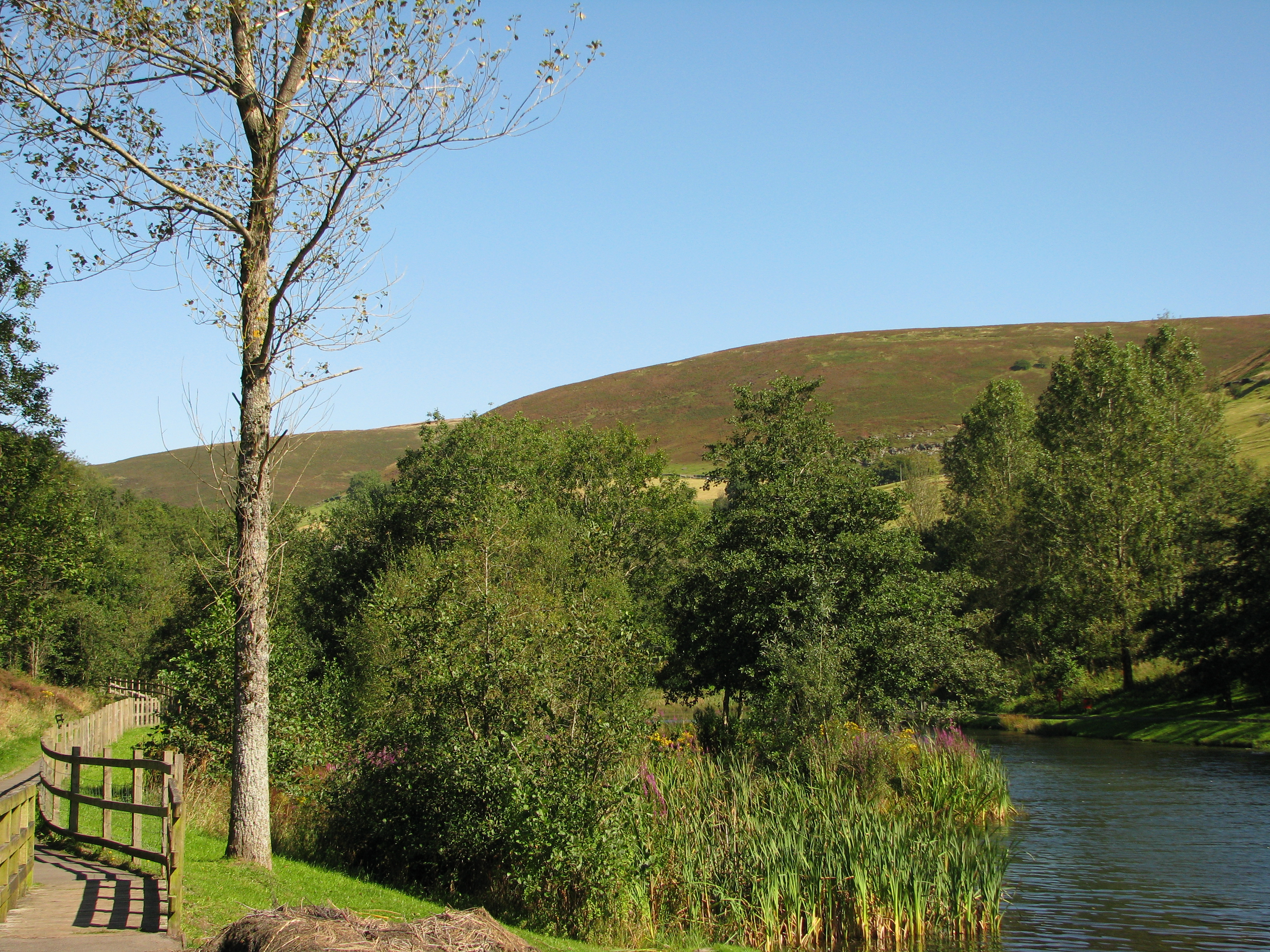
Walk by the lakes

Following the demise of the coal industry in the 1980s the natural environment is again highly regarded. There are walking trails in the area ranging from gentle lakeside walks to more energetic hillside climbs to over 580m.
