= Rassau =

Village and community in Blaenau Gwent, Wales

Rassau: Welsh: Rasa
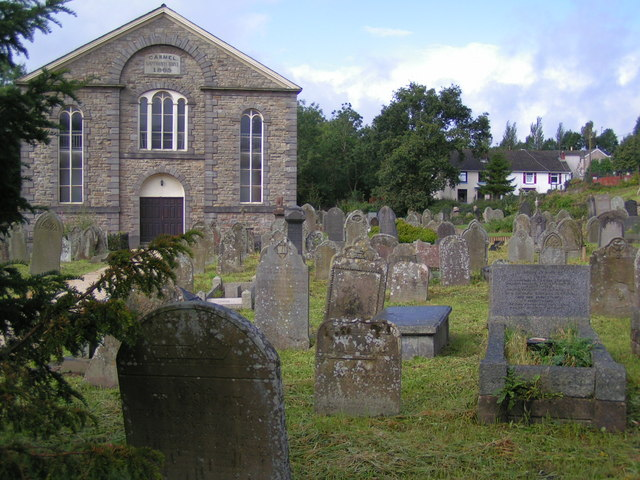
- Carmel chapel, Carmeltown

- Location within Blaenau Gwent
- Population: 3,234 (2012)
- Principal area: Blaenau Gwent
- Preserved county: Gwent
- Country: Wales
- Sovereign state: United Kingdom
- Post town: EBBW VALE
- Postcode district: NP23
- Dialling code: 01495
- Police: Gwent
- Fire: South Wales
- Ambulance: Welsh
- UK Parliament: Blaenau Gwent and Rhymney
- Senedd Cymru – Welsh Parliament: Blaenau Gwent
- List of places UK Wales Blaenau Gwent 51.802°N 3.222°W Map of the community

Rassau, sometimes The Rassau (Welsh: Rasa or Rasau), is a village and community located in the historic county of Brecknockshire (Breconshire) and the preserved county of Gwent. It currently lies on the northern edge of the county borough of Blaenau Gwent in Wales. According to the 2011 census, the population of Rassau is 3,234. Residents often refer to either Old Rassau and New Rassau or Bottom Rassau and Top Rassau to distinguish the different parts of the village.

== History ==
The Rassau area was historically part of the parish of Llangynidr in Brecknockshire. In 1878 Rassau was added to the Ebbw Vale Urban Sanitary District. When elected county councils were established in 1889, urban sanitary districts which straddled county boundaries, as Ebbw Vale did, were placed entirely in the administrative county which had the majority of the district's population. As shown in the 'proposal map' for such changes (with the Sanitary districts in blue lines and the county changes proposed in red dashes), Rassau and neighbouring Beaufort were therefore transferred from Brecknockshire to the administrative county of Monmouthshire on 1 April 1889. Ebbw Vale Urban Sanitary District became Ebbw Vale Urban District in 1894. Further local government reform in 1974 saw Ebbw Vale Urban District abolished, becoming the Ebbw Vale community of the Blaenau Gwent district of Gwent. A Beaufort community was created in 1985 from part of the Ebbw Vale community, covering both Beaufort and Rassau. This was further divided in 2010 to create a community of Rassau.

== Welsh language ==
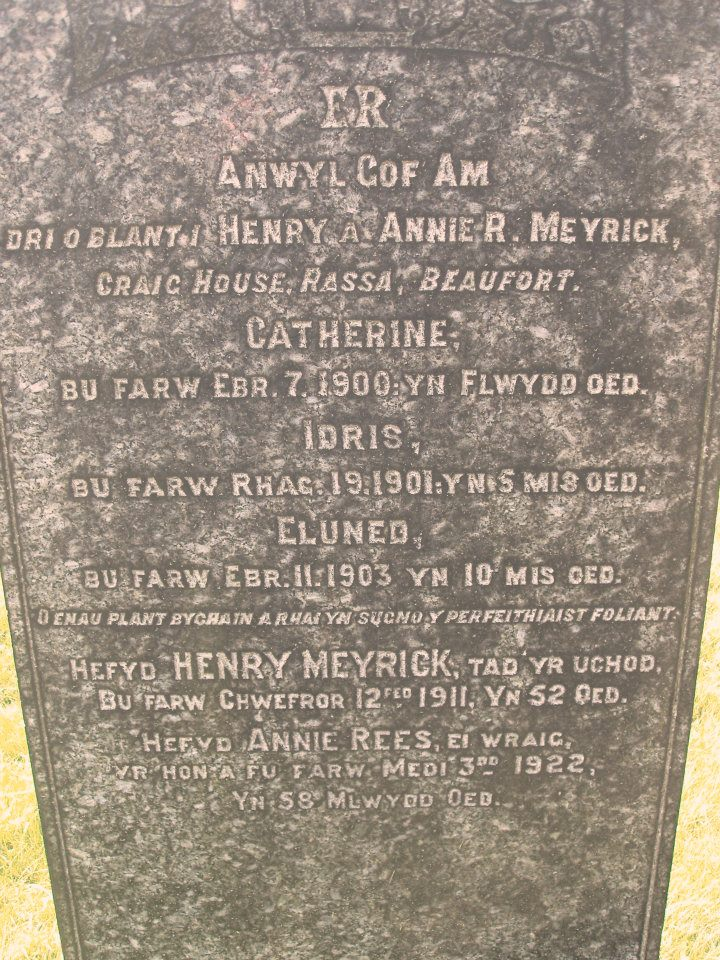
Gravestone dating from the first half of the 20th century and inscribed in Welsh

According to the 1991 census, only 107 residents, or 2.7% of the population aged three and over, could speak Welsh. However, in the 2001 census, 281 residents, or 8.8% of the population aged three and over, were recorded as able to speak Welsh. It is likely that Welsh was still the everyday language of a number of residents throughout the early 1900s because in 1909, Theophilus Jones described the neighbouring village of Beaufort as bilingual, the language preference being English. This is supported by the Reverend Peter Williams' monograph, 'The Story of Carmel', published in 1965. He reports that between 1904 and 1906, the change was made to conduct the evening Sunday service in English, whereas previously both the morning and evening services had been in Welsh.

== Customs ==
At one time the Mari Lwyd was widespread all over Gwent – especially in the Welsh-speaking areas of the north and west, but as the Welsh language lost ground so too did the Mari Lwyd. Its last recorded appearance in the borough was in The Rassau during the 1880s.

== Circuit of Wales ==
An 830 acres (340 ha) site northwest of the village and beyond Rassau Industrial Estate was the proposed site of the Circuit of Wales, a 3.5 miles (5.6 km) motor racing circuit. The proposed £425m development was claimed by backers to represent the most significant capital investment programme in automotive and motor sports infrastructure in the UK in 50 years.

As of 2017, planning permission for the project was refused for the third and final time by the Welsh Government.

== See also ==
- Rassa Railroad
