= Beaufort, Blaenau Gwent =

Beaufort: Welsh: Cendl
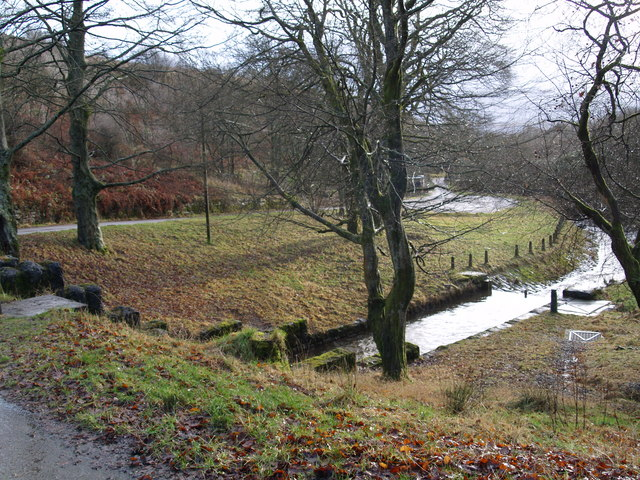
- Carno reservoir, Rassau, Beaufort

- Location within Blaenau Gwent
- Population: 3,866
- Principal area: Blaenau Gwent
- Preserved county: Gwent
- Country: Wales
- Sovereign state: United Kingdom
- Post town: EBBW VALE
- Postcode district: NP23
- Dialling code: 01495
- Police: Gwent
- Fire: South Wales
- Ambulance: Welsh
- UK Parliament: Blaenau Gwent and Rhymney
- Senedd Cymru – Welsh Parliament: Blaenau Gwent
- List of places UK Wales Blaenau Gwent 51.797°N 3.206°W Map of the community

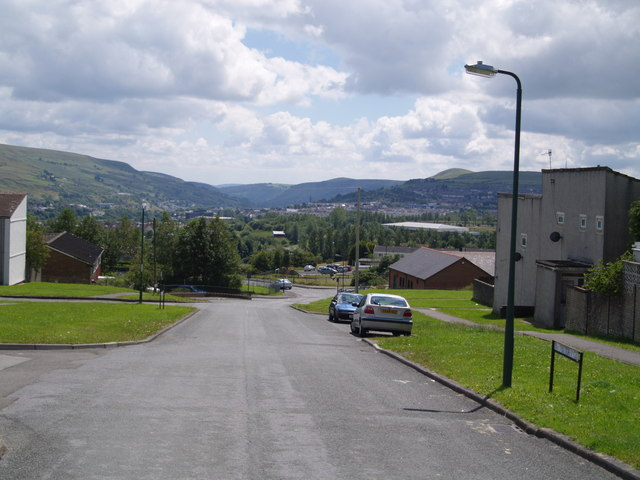
Rassau looking towards Ebbw Vale

Beaufort (Welsh: Cendl or Y Cendl) is a village and community on the northern edge of the county borough of Blaenau Gwent in Wales. It is located in the historic county of Brecknockshire (Breconshire) and the preserved county of Gwent. According to the 2011 census, the population of the ward and community of Beaufort is 3,866

The settlement arose on the boundary of two parishes, Llangattock in Brecknockshire and Aberystruth in Monmouthshire on the 1779 establishment of the Beaufort Iron Works by Edward and Jonathan Kendall (Cendl) after whom the new settlement was first named.

== Description ==
The village's name derives from the fact that much of the local land was originally owned by the Duke of Beaufort. It is bordered to the west by the Ebbw River which passes close to St David's Church (Church in Wales). 'Carmeltown', with its Carmel Chapel, lies between the Rassau and the rest of Beaufort. The 'rest of Beaufort' (i.e. geographically the eastern part of Beaufort) is frequently referred to as 'Beaufort' or 'Beaufort Hill'.

Beaufort and parts of nearby Badminton and Rassau are some of the most affluent areas in the county. House prices in these area are some of the most expensive in the area, with a new housing development at the top of Beaufort Hill being developed with house starting around £200,000 - £300,000.

The village also has a theatre with a ball room.

Up until 1958 the village was served by Beaufort railway station, a station on the LNWR railway line from Abergavenny - Merthyr.

== Welsh ==
Historically, the language of Beaufort was Welsh. In his 1893 book 'Wales and her language', John E Southall, reports that over 60% of the population of Beaufort spoke Welsh. The Reverend Peter Williams' monograph, 'The Story of Carmel', concerning Carmel Congregational Church (chapel) in Beaufort, published in 1965, reports that between 1904 and 1906 the change was made to conduct the morning Sunday service in English, whereas previously both the morning and evening services had been in Welsh. Beaufort was bilingual with both Welsh and English-language chapels until at least the end of the 19th century with the Welsh language surviving well into the 20th century before disappearing as a native language by World War II. Elements of a Welsh service continued (e.g. in Carmel Chapel) until the 1970s. Amongst its Nonconformist chapels, the Welsh Independent Congregational Chapel 'Carmel' was pre-eminent, rising to national fame under the leadership of Thomas Rees DD (author of History of Protestant Nonconformity in Wales, whose second edition was printed in 1883). According to the 2001 census, 440 residents, or 11.7% of the village's population aged 3 and over could speak Welsh. This gave Beaufort the highest percentage of Welsh Speakers in Blaenau Gwent.

== History ==
Beaufort was historically part of the parish of Llangattock in Brecknockshire. In 1878 Beaufort was added to the Ebbw Vale Urban Sanitary District. When elected county councils were established in 1889, urban sanitary districts which straddled county boundaries, as Ebbw Vale did (shown in the map opposite below in blue lines), were placed entirely in the administrative county which had the majority of the district's population. Beaufort and neighbouring Rassau were therefore transferred from Brecknockshire to the administrative county of Monmouthshire on 1 April 1889.

Ebbw Vale Urban Sanitary District became Ebbw Vale Urban District in 1894. Further local government reform in 1974 saw Ebbw Vale Urban District abolished, becoming the Ebbw Vale community of the Blaenau Gwent district of Gwent. A Beaufort community was created in 1985 from part of the Ebbw Vale community, covering both Beaufort and Rassau. This was further divided in 2010 to create three communities: Beaufort (including the village and the area to the north), Badminton (to the south), and Rassau (to the west).

== Places of interest in Beaufort ==
Parc Nant y Waun is a nature reserve incorporating 22 hectares of grassland, mires and reservoirs which was officially opened in 2007. Home to wildlife species, it includes a picnic area, outdoor classroom and angling Club.

Carmel Chapel is a Grade II listed building

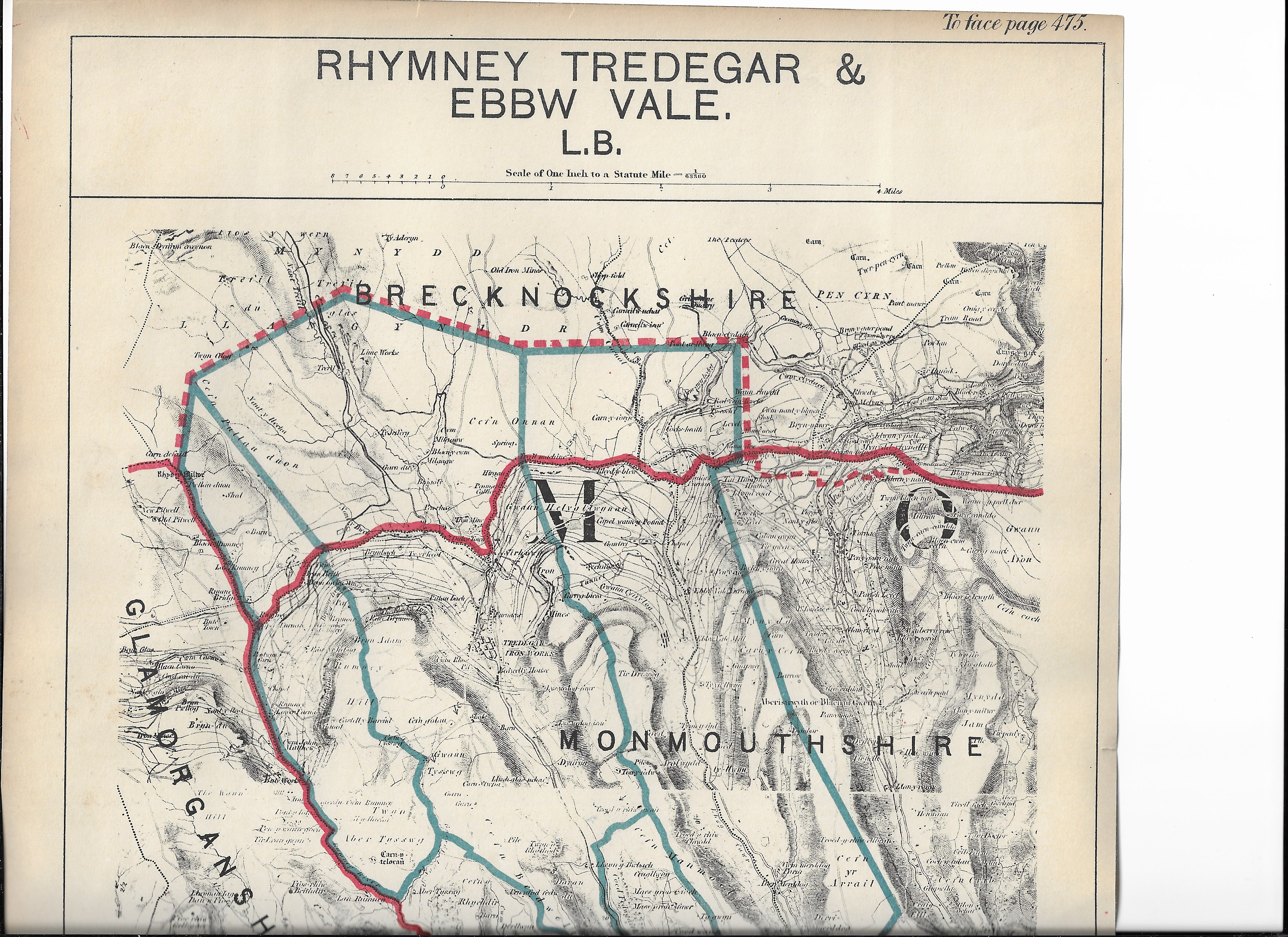
Proposed county boundary changes 19 c. Current boundary (at that time) is in solid red line. Proposed boundary in red dashes.

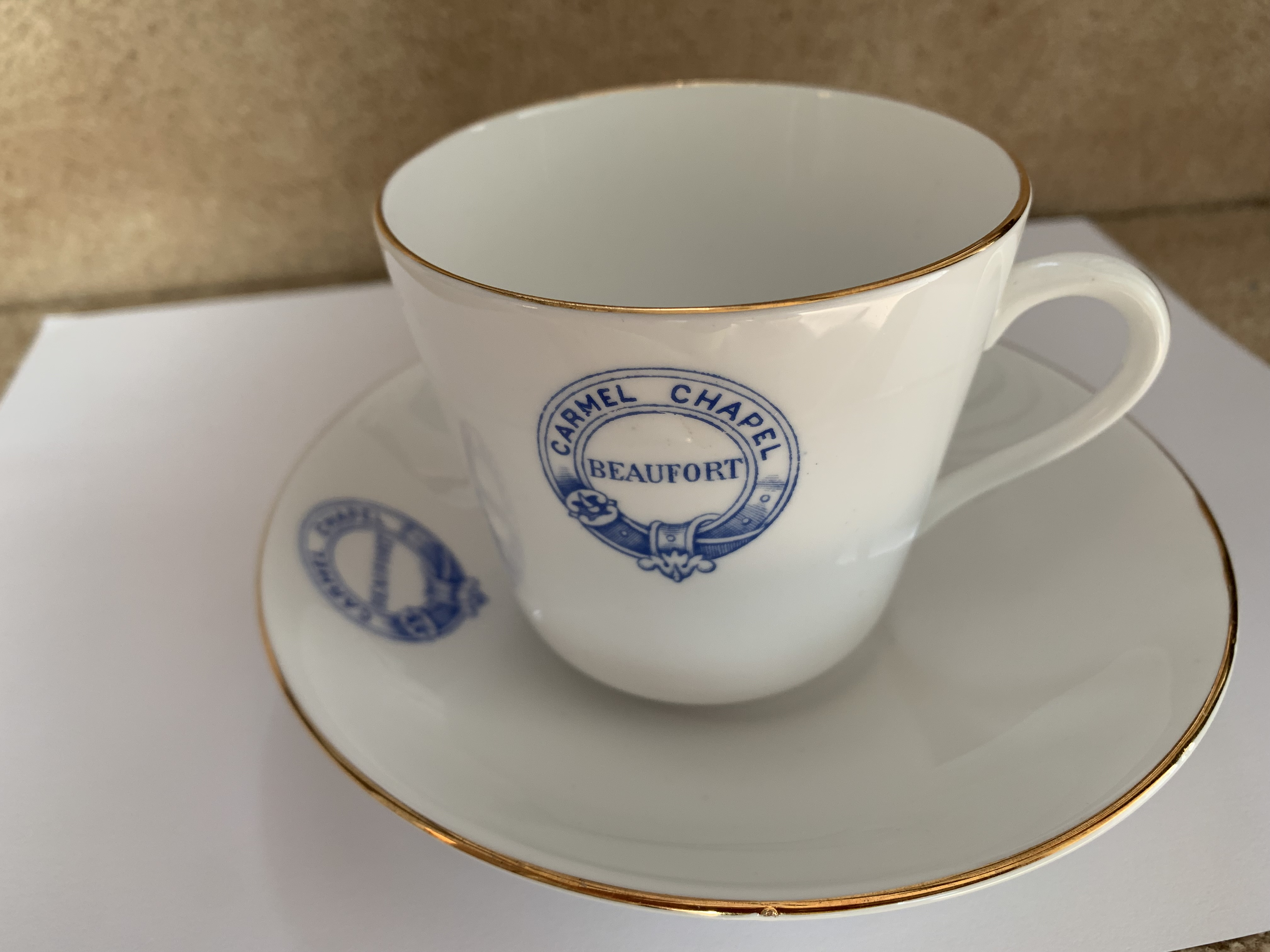
Chapel crockery of Carmel Chapel, Beaufort (Breconshire and later Mon)

== Culture ==
The Beaufort Male Choir, formed in 1897, has over sixty singers from Gwent.

The musical director is Craig James and accompanist Margaret Davies. in 2013, Margaret Davies, the choir's accompanist for 43 years was named on Her Majesty the Queens New Years Honours list, receiving the BEM for services to Music and the Community.

== Industrial history ==
=== Beaufort Iron Works ===
Edward (1750–1807) and Jonathan Kendall or Cendl of Dan-y-Parc Crickhowell established these works in 1779 on a 99-year lease. In 1833, by which time there were four furnaces, the works were taken over as an extension of their Nantyglo operations by the Bailey brothers, Joseph and Crawshay who put their sister's son, William Partridge (1800–1862), in charge. Unmarried Agents (senior managers) of the local iron works companies lodged at the Rhyd-y-Blew, a drovers' inn, properly the hunting lodge of the Duke of Beaufort who carried out an annual rough-shoot of the area. The inn was at the end of the toll road from Merthyr Tydfil and for the rest of the year provided the drovers’ animals very good pasture and water in the Ebbw river. Suffolk-born Partridge married Charlotte Bevan, daughter of the Rhyd-y-Blew's innkeeper, and remained in charge of the Beaufort iron works until his early death in 1862. The works soon closed. In conjunction with the then well-known Needham family of Beaufort mining engineers Partridge sons became involved in local collieries and established the substantial business later known as Partridge Jones. Grandson, rugby international and Barbarian, "Birdie" Partridge founded the Army Rugby Union. The Beaufort works house eventually became a fever hospital in 1902 and has since been demolished.

The ground, just south of Beaufort Hill, and close to a Chapel of Rest in the area known as Glanyafon, once occupied by the iron works has long been cleared and covered with houses. Giant pieces of slag remained in place until the most recent developments.

== See also ==
- Rassau
