= Nantyglo and Blaina =

- Community
- Principal area: Blaenau Gwent
- Country: Wales
- Sovereign state: United Kingdom
- Police: Gwent
- Fire: South Wales
- Ambulance: Welsh
- List of places UK Wales Blaenau Gwent Map of the community

Nantyglo and Blaina (Welsh: Nantyglo a Blaenau) is a community in Blaenau Gwent, South Wales, including the small towns of Blaina and Nantyglo. The population in 2011 was 9,443.

== Freedom of the Town ==
The following people and military units have received the Freedom of the Town of Nantyglo and Blaina.

=== Individuals ===
- Michael Ruddock OBE: 10 September 2004.
