= Llanhilleth =

Llanhilleth: Welsh: Llanhiledd
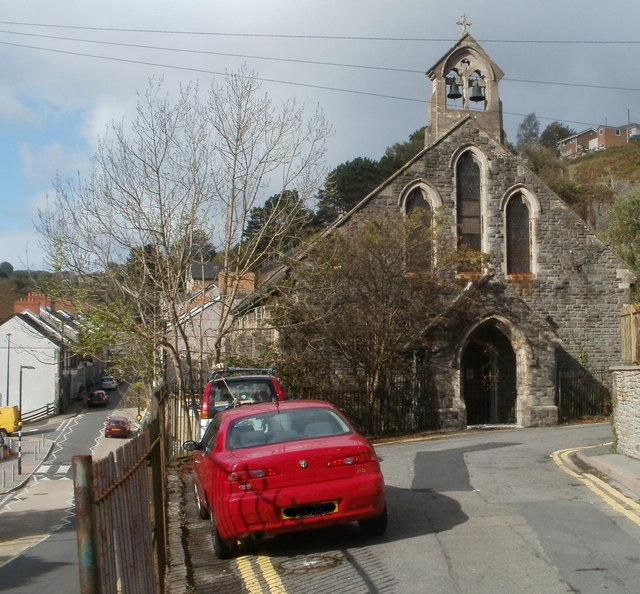
- St Mark's Church

- Location within Blaenau Gwent
- Population: 4,797 (2011)
- OS grid reference: SO2100
- Principal area: Blaenau Gwent
- Country: Wales
- Sovereign state: United Kingdom
- Post town: NEWPORT
- Postcode district: NP11
- Post town: ABERTILLERY
- Postcode district: NP13
- Dialling code: 01495
- Police: Gwent
- Fire: South Wales
- Ambulance: Welsh
- UK Parliament: Blaenau Gwent and Rhymney
- Senedd Cymru – Welsh Parliament: Blaenau Gwent
- List of places UK Wales Blaenau Gwent 51.69729°N 3.135953°W Map of the community

Llanhilleth (Welsh: Llanhiledd) is a village, community and an electoral ward on the A467 road between Abertillery and Crumlin in Blaenau Gwent, Wales.

Two large mounds in the field behind the Carpenter's Arms are the remains of the medieval Llanhilleth castle which originally had two large, stone-built towers.

Part of the Monmouthshire Canal ran through the parish; the Ebbw River forms the western boundary of the parish.

The twin-belled Church in Wales church of St Mark is located on Brooklyn Terrace, near the High Street junction. It is in the benefice of Abertillery with Cwmtillery with Llanhilleth with Six Bells, in the deanery of Pontypool, and was built in 1898.

Nearby are the villages of Aberbeeg and St Illtyd, within the community, the latter of which contains the former parish church. In the far south of the community is the village of Swffryd.

The name comes from Llanheledd (Welsh for 'church of Saint Heledd'), with the /i/ replacing the original /e/ due to the regional dialect of the area (Gwenhwyseg) changing the /e/ sound to /i/.

== Facilities ==
The village contains the Miners Institute, which provides many essential ceremonies for locals, such as Weddings, Christenings and Funeral Receptions. The building is connected to St. Illtyd's Primary School, which supplies for ages 3 to 11.

The Llanhilleth Rugby Club sits along a road sprouting off the A467, at the entrance from Crumlin.

== See also ==
- Llanhilleth railway station, reopened in 2008
- List of schools in Blaenau Gwent
