= Cwm, Blaenau Gwent =

Cwm: Welsh: Y Cwm
- Location within Blaenau Gwent
- Population: 4,120 (2019)
- OS grid reference: SO1805
- Principal area: Blaenau Gwent
- Preserved county: Gwent
- Country: Wales
- Sovereign state: United Kingdom
- Post town: Ebbw Vale
- Postcode district: NP23
- Dialling code: 01495
- Police: Gwent
- Fire: South Wales
- Ambulance: Welsh
- UK Parliament: Blaenau Gwent and Rhymney
- Senedd Cymru – Welsh Parliament: Blaenau Gwent
- List of places UK Wales Blaenau Gwent 51.7409°N 3.1812°W Map of the community

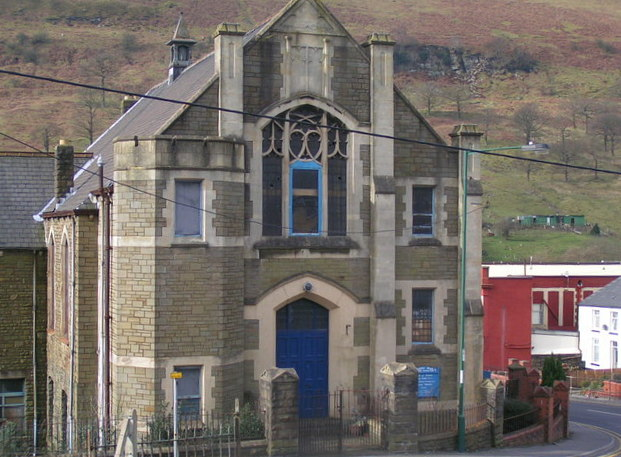
Cwm Methodist church, Mill Terrace, built 1895

Cwm (from Welsh: Y Cwm, Translation The Valley) is a former coal mining village, community and electoral ward three miles (4.8 km) south of Ebbw Vale in the county borough of Blaenau Gwent, Wales, within the historic boundaries of Monmouthshire, United Kingdom. In the far north of the community lies Waunlwyd.

== Etymology ==
The name Cwm is thought to have derived from the farm on the present day nature reserve (Silent Valley), Cwm Merddog. Cwm is the Welsh word for valley and the name Merddog is believed to be a corruption of the name of the old farm that used to be here, Troed y Rhiw y Myrdd Fach, which translated means 'the foot of the myriad little hills'. But with the development of the village and coal industry the name was just simply shortened to Cwm. Locally the village to its inhabitants and neighbouring areas is sometimes referred to as The Cwm. A photograph of an old farm house, Troed y rhiw y Myrydd Fach, located behind Tirzah Chapel Cwm, is in Keith Thomas' 'Old Ebbw Vale in Photographs', Vol 2, image 28.

== History ==
Originally a rather insignificant spot in the Ebbw Valley, with only a few scattered farms and a water mill until the end of the nineteenth century with the sinking of the Marine Colliery in 1889. Cwm developed as a village at the turn of the twentieth century, with the building of numerous churches, chapels, public houses, working man's clubs, a miners' institute etc., and terraced housing typical of the South Wales Valleys, being constructed in a very straight, linear pattern to house the community that worked in the local collieries.

Tirzah Baptist Chapel was built in 1859 in the Simple Gothic style of the gable entry type. It was destroyed by fire in 1916 or 1917, but was rebuilt in 1921. The church is still active and has weekly Sunday services.

At the southern edge of Cwm, near the road from Cwm to Aberbeeg, lies Llandavel, now only a few houses, which was a busy community long before Cwm existed. At one time Llandavel had a colliery named in its own right.

== Coal industry ==
The main employment of the village was the coal industry as there were several small collieries and drift mines located on the mountain side as well as the main colliery located on the valley floor.

=== Marine Colliery ===
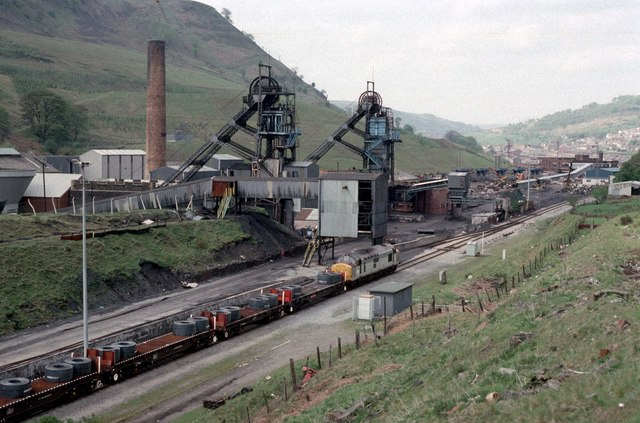
Marine Colliery in 1989, a few weeks after closure.

The sinking of this colliery began in 1889 by the Ebbw Vale Steel, Iron and Coal Company Ltd. The downcast shaft being 418 yards (382 m) deep and the up-cast 414 yards (379 m) yards. The first coal was produced in 1893.

From the Inspector of Mines list 1896, there were 833 men employed producing from the Old coal, Three quarters, Big and Elled seams. In 1913 there were 2,407 men employed. From a report of 1923, there were 944 men working at Marine No. 1, producing from the Old Coal seam and there were 1,097 employed at No. 2 working the Elled, Big Vein and Three Quarters seams.

On 1 March 1927 an underground gas and coal dust explosion killed 52 men. The death toll would have been many more if it hadn't been for the quick thinking of the manager Mr. Edward Gay, who on his arrival at the mine, ordered the ventilation fan to be slowed down so that it wouldn't fan the flames of any fires burning below. It turned out that his actions saved the lives of the men still alive in the district where the explosion occurred. At this time there were 1400 men employed at the colliery but fortunately when the explosion occurred only the night shift were working underground.

By 1935 the ownership of the colliery change hands to Partridge, Jones & John Paton Ltd. who worked the colliery until Nationalisation in 1947, when there were 1,540 men employed.

An incident at Marine Colliery led to an important case in the law of England and Wales. After a miner named Edwards was killed by a falling rock at Marine Colliery on 6 November 1947, the case of Edwards v National Coal Board in 1949 established the concept of "reasonable practicability" with avoiding workplace deaths.

During the 1970s it became integrated with Six Bells Colliery with all the coal being handled at the Marine. In 1982 £2.5 million was spent on a new skip winding system, also a new coal handling plant was installed on the surface. Marine was the last deep mine to work in the Ebbw valleys, it closed in March 1989.

== Transport ==
The village and the colliery were connected to the Great Western Railway network with a station in the middle of Cwm and a halt at Marine Colliery to transport the coal it produced. The station was closed to passengers in 1962 and Marine halt shut when the colliery was demolished in 1989. With the reinstatement of passenger trains on the Ebbw Valley Railway in 2008, there are plans to rebuild Cwm railway station but there has been no commitment or timescale given for a station in Cwm.

In 2002 work began on the Cwm road bypass. It has markedly reduced traffic travelling through the village, thus easing the congestion and pollution.

There is only one hourly bus service that runs between Ebbw Vale and Abertillery. Currently, there are talks underway for a potential modern app travel service; where residents can book an as and when service via bus to further destinations such as Cwmbran & Newport. This app service would replace the scrapped bus services of the 22 and X18.

== Education ==
Cwm originally had a secondary school called Dyffryn located at the bottom of the village. Dyffryn's catchment area included Waunlwyd and Swffryd. However, due to falling pupil numbers Dyffryn Secondary Modern School closed with pupils from Cwm then going to Ebbw Comprehensive School. Pupils now go to Ebbw Fawr Learning Community. Cwm's original primary school was located by the parish hall called Cwmyrderch, but this has also been closed and now the village primary school is located at the top of the settlement by the football field, simply named Cwm Primary School.

== Sport ==
An association football club from the village, Cwm Albions F.C., played in the Southern Football League before the First World War.

== Notable people ==
- John Quantick (1909–1972), footballer with Hull City
- Victor Spinetti (1929–2012), actor and former pupil of Monmouth School, born and raised above the fish and chip shop
- Ryland Davies (1943–2023), operatic tenor, born in Cwm
- Mark Williams, World Snooker Champion, born in Cwm in 1975
