= Ebbw Vale North =

Coordinates: 51°47′05″N 3°12′33″W

- Community
- Location within Blaenau Gwent
- Principal area: Blaenau Gwent
- Country: Wales
- Sovereign state: United Kingdom
- Police: Gwent
- Fire: South Wales
- Ambulance: Welsh
- List of places UK Wales Blaenau Gwent Map of the community

Ebbw Vale North (Welsh: Gogledd Glynebwy) is a community in Blaenau Gwent, South Wales. It includes the north of Ebbw Vale and was formed in 2010 from part of that community. The population in 2011 was 4,561.
