= Blaenau Gwent =

County borough in Wales

Blaenau Gwent County Borough Bwrdeistref Sirol Blaenau Gwent (Welsh)
- County borough
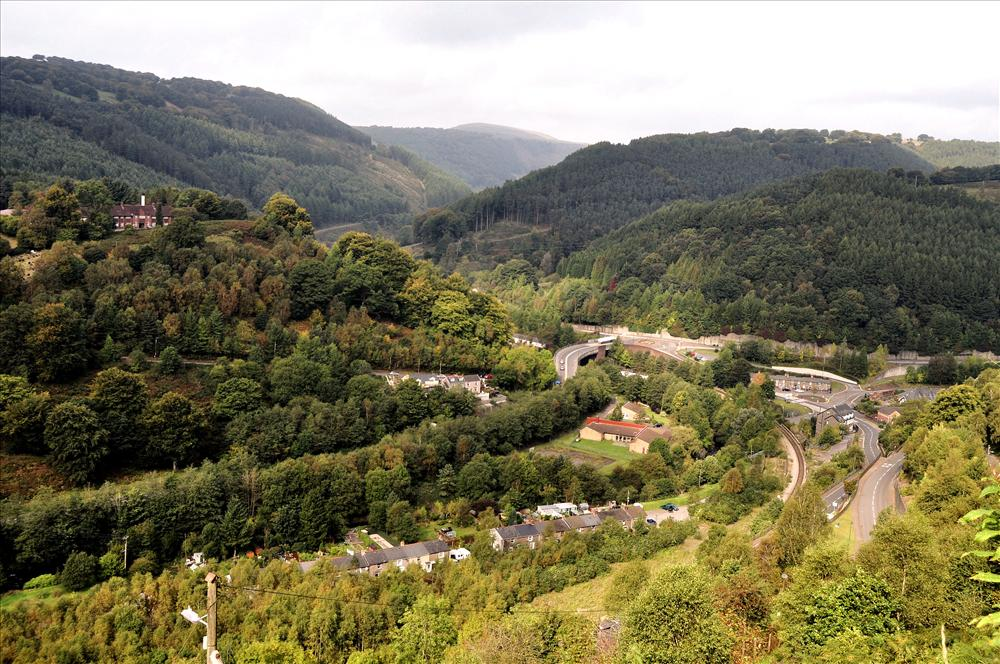
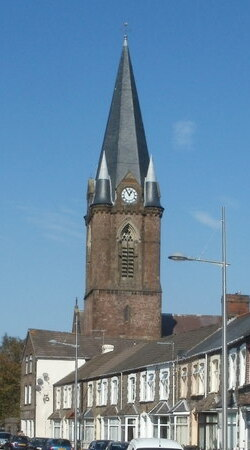
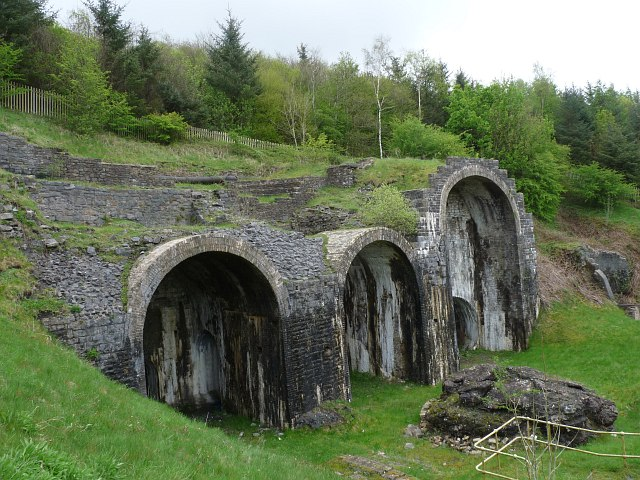
- Left to Right: Overlooking Aberbeeg from Brynithel; Christ Church, Ebbw Vale; Sirhowy Ironworks

- Coat of arms
- Motto: Welsh: Undeb A Rhyddid, lit. 'unity and freedom'
- Blaenau Gwent shown within Wales
- Coordinates: 51°46.5′N 3°11.75′W
- Sovereign state: United Kingdom
- Country: Wales
- Preserved county: Gwent
- Incorporated: 1 April 1996
- Administrative HQ: Ebbw Vale

Government
  - Type: Principal council
  - Body: Blaenau Gwent County Borough Council
  - Control: Labour
  - MPs: Nick Smith (L)
  - MSs: 6 in Blaenau Gwent Caerffili Rhymni

Area
  - Total: 42 sq mi (109 km^{2})
  - Rank: 22nd

Population (2025)
  - Total: 67,593
  - Rank: 21st
  - Density: 1,610/sq mi (622/km^{2})
- Time zone: UTC+0 (GMT)
  - Summer (DST): UTC+1 (BST)
- ISO 3166 code: GB-BGW
- GSS code: W06000019
- Website: blaenau-gwent.gov.uk

Blaenau Gwent (/ˌblaɪnaɪ ˈɡwɛnt/; Welsh: [ˈbləi.nai]) is a county borough in the south-east of Wales. It borders Monmouthshire and Torfaen to the east, Caerphilly to the west and Powys to the north. Its main towns are Abertillery, Brynmawr, Ebbw Vale and Tredegar. Its highest point is Coity Mountain at 1,896 feet (578 m).

== Government ==
The borough was formed in 1974 as a local government district of Gwent. It covered the whole area of five former districts and a single parish from a sixth, which were all abolished at the same time:

- Abertillery Urban District
- Brynmawr Urban District
- Ebbw Vale Urban District
- Llanelly parish from Crickhowell Rural District
- Nantyglo and Blaina Urban District
- Tredegar Urban District

Brynmawr and Llanelly had been in the administrative county of Brecknockshire prior to the reforms, whilst the other areas had all been in the administrative county of Monmouthshire. Gwent County Council provided county-level services for the new borough.

The new borough was named Blaenau Gwent, meaning uplands of Gwent. The name had previously been an alternative name for the ancient parish of Aberystruth which had covered a large part of the area and had its parish church at Blaina.

Blaenau Gwent was reconstituted in 1996 as a county borough, taking over the county-level functions from the abolished Gwent County Council. At the same time Llanelly was transferred to the reconstituted Monmouthshire. The area is now governed by Blaenau Gwent County Borough Council, which is a principal council.

=== Politics ===
Blaenau Gwent hit the headlines at the 2005 UK general election when an independent candidate, Peter Law, won the Westminster seat. He had resigned from the Labour Party after an internal party row following the retirement of incumbent MP Llew Smith, and defeated the official Labour candidate, Maggie Jones, by a margin of 9,121 votes. The seat had previously been held by Aneurin Bevan and Michael Foot, and was considered one of Labour's safest. Law died on 25 April 2006 and in the by-election, a former supporter of his, Dai Davies won, running as an independent candidate. Peter Law's widow, Trish Law, won his former Welsh Assembly seat, also running as an independent candidate. In 2007 she retained her seat. Dai Davies held the Westminster seat for the People's Voice from 2006 – 2010 when he lost his seat in a huge majority to Labour's Nick Smith of 10,516 votes. Alun Davies recaptured the seat for Labour at the Assembly elections in 2011 and then Labour won a landslide victory in the 2012 local elections taking 33 seats out of 42. Plaid Cymru nearly won the seat in the 2016 Assembly election, and Labour lost the council in the 2017 local elections.

From 2024, all of Blaenau Gwent would be in the Blaenau Gwent and Rhymney UK Parliament constituency.

== Archaeology ==
In February 2020, ancient cairns dated back to 4,500 year-old used to bury the leaders or chieftains of Neolithic tribes people were revealed in the Cwmcelyn valley by the Aberystruth Archaeological Society.

"It is thousands of years old undoubtedly, and came at a time when people first started settling here in Wales, farming and working the land by clearing the heavily wooded mountain sides of the Gwent valleys. The site is also found opposite the huts, so there could be some connection, though we think this burial may even be from a slightly earlier period than that" said archaeologist Ian Fewings.

== List of wards ==
- Abertillery
- Badminton
- Beaufort
- Blaina
- Brynmawr
- Cwm
- Cwmtillery
- Ebbw Vale North
- Ebbw Vale South
- George Town
- Llanhilleth
- Nantyglo
- Rassau
- Six Bells
- Sirhowy
- Tredegar Central and West

== Other information ==
In 2011 Blaenau Gwent had the highest level of severe child poverty in Wales, as revealed in statistical data published in a report by Save the Children.

According to the 2011 Census, 5.5% of the county's 67,348 (3,705 residents) resident-population can speak, read, and write Welsh, with 7.8%, or 5,284 residents, being able to speak Welsh.

=== Sport and Leisure ===
There are three Sports Centres located throughout the Borough offering swimming, sports courts and pitches. The sport centres are operated by Aneurin Leisure. They are located at: Abertillery, Ebbw Vale and Tredegar.

There are many sports played in Blaenau Gwent these are a few:

==== Rugby ====
Blaenau Gwent has a rich and vibrant rugby history. There are many rugby union clubs throughout the borough. These are:

- Abertillery RFC/Blaenau Gwent RFC,
- Beaufort RFC
- Blania RFC
- Brynithel RFC
- Brynmawr RFC
- Cwm RFC
- Ebbw Vale RFC
- RTB Ebbw Vale RFC
- Llanhilleth RFC
- Nantyglo RFC
- Old Tyleryan RFC
- Tredegar Ironsides RFC
- Tredegar RFC
- Trefil RFC

==== Football ====
The Football teams in Blaenau Gwent are:

- Abertillery Bluebirds
- Abertillery Excelsiors
- Beaufort Colts
- Dukestown
- Islwyn Junior
- Nantyglo
- RTB Ebbw Vale
- Tredegar Town

== Freedom of the Borough ==
The following people and military units have received the Freedom of the Borough of Blaenau Gwent.

=== Individuals ===
- Mark Williams: 14 March 2019.
- Eva Clarke: 26 January 2023.

=== Military Units ===
- The Royal Welsh: 19 February 2011.
- The Royal British Legion: 4 November 2021.
