= NP postcode area =

Postcode area within the United Kingdom

Newport
- Postcode area
- Coordinates: 51.685°N 3.019°W
- Country: United Kingdom
- Postcode area: NP
- Postcode area name: Newport
- Post towns: 14
- Postcode districts: 25
- Postcode sectors: 142
- Postcodes (live): 13,698
- Postcodes (total): 30,399
- Statistics as at May 2020

The NP postcode area, also known as the Newport postcode area, is a group of eighteen postcode districts, which are subdivisions of fourteen post towns. These cover south-east Wales, including Newport, Pontypool, Abergavenny, Monmouth, Chepstow, Abertillery, Usk, Tredegar, New Tredegar, Ebbw Vale, Crickhowell, Blackwood, Caldicot and Cwmbran, plus a small part of the English counties of Gloucestershire and Herefordshire.

== Coverage ==
The approximate coverage of the postcode districts:

Postcode district	Post town	Coverage	Local authority area(s)
NP4	PONTYPOOL	Pontypool, Blaenavon, Little Mill, Griffithstown, parts of Glascoed	Torfaen, Monmouthshire
NP7	ABERGAVENNY	Abergavenny	Monmouthshire, Herefordshire, Powys
NP8	CRICKHOWELL	Crickhowell, Ffawyddog	Powys
NP10	NEWPORT	Western Newport, including Bassaleg, Duffryn, Rogerstone, Coedkernew, St Brides	Newport
NP11	NEWPORT	North-western Newport, including: Abercarn, Crumlin, Cwmfelinfach, Risca, Ynysddu	Caerphilly
NP12	BLACKWOOD	Blackwood, Pontllanfraith, Wyllie	Caerphilly
NP13	ABERTILLERY	Abertillery	Blaenau Gwent
NP15	USK	Usk, Raglan	Monmouthshire
NP16	CHEPSTOW	Chepstow, Sedbury, Beachley	Monmouthshire, Forest of Dean
NP18	NEWPORT	Eastern Newport, including Caerleon, Langstone, Llanwern, Nash, Llandegveth Underwood	Newport, Monmouthshire, Torfaen
NP19	NEWPORT	Eastern and East Central Newport, including: Beechwood, Maindee, St. Julians, Ringland	Newport
NP20	NEWPORT	Western and West Central Newport, including: City centre, Pill, Maesglas, Crindau, Malpas, Bettws	Newport
NP22	TREDEGAR	Tredegar, Rhymney	Blaenau Gwent, Caerphilly
NP23	EBBW VALE	Ebbw Vale, Brynmawr, Cwm	Blaenau Gwent
NP24	NEW TREDEGAR	New Tredegar	Caerphilly
NP25	MONMOUTH	Monmouth, Wyesham, Redbrook, Welsh Newton	Monmouthshire, Forest of Dean, Herefordshire
NP26	CALDICOT	Caldicot, Magor, Newport	Monmouthshire, Newport
NP44	CWMBRAN	Cwmbran	Torfaen
NP90	NEWPORT	Newport	Newport

== Map ==
NP postcode area map, showing postcode districts in red and post towns in grey text, with links to nearby BS, CF, GL, HR and LD postcode areas.

== See also ==
- Postcode Address File
- List of postcode areas in the United Kingdom
