= Blaenau Gwent and Rhymney =

UK Parliament constituency (since 2024)

- constituency for the House of Commons
- Interactive map of the constituency.
- Location of the constituency within Wales
- Electorate: 71,079 (March 2020)
- Major settlements: Ebbw Vale, Tredegar, Rhymney, Bargoed, Brynmawr, Abertillery

Current constituency
- Created: 2024
- Member of Parliament: Nick Smith (Labour)
- Seats: One
- Created from: Blaenau Gwent, Caerphilly, Islwyn, Merthyr Tydfil and Rhymney.

Overlaps
- Senedd: Blaenau Gwent Caerffili Rhymni

Blaenau Gwent and Rhymney (Welsh: Blaenau Gwent a Rhymni) is a constituency of the House of Commons in the UK Parliament, first contested at the 2024 general election, following the 2023 review of Westminster constituencies. It is currently represented by Nick Smith of the Labour Party, who was the MP for the predecessor constituency of Blaenau Gwent from 2010 to 2024.

== Boundaries ==
Under the 2023 review, the constituency was defined as being composed of the following, as they existed on 1 December 2020:

- The County Borough of Blaenau Gwent.
- The County Borough of Caerphilly wards of: Aberbargoed; Bargoed; Darren Valley; Gilfach; Moriah; New Tredegar; Pontlottyn; Twyn Carno.

Following local government boundary reviews which came into effect in May 2022, the constituency now comprises the following from the 2024 general election:

- The County Borough of Blaenau Gwent.
- The County Borough of Caerphilly wards of: Aberbargoed and Bargoed; Darren Valley; Gilfach; Moriah and Pontlottyn; New Tredegar ; Twyn Carno.

It comprises the whole of the abolished Blaenau Gwent constituency, which was coterminous with the county borough of the same name, together with the Rhymney valley which was previously part of the abolished Merthyr Tydfil and Rhymney constituency. Small areas also transferred from Caerphilly and Islwyn (abolished).

== Elections ==
=== Elections in the 2020s ===
General election 2024: Blaenau Gwent and Rhymney
Party	Candidate	Votes	%	±%
Labour	Nick Smith	16,027	53.6	+3.2
Plaid Cymru	Niamh Salkeld	3,844	12.8	+6.4
Conservative	Hannah Jarvis	3,776	12.6	−7.0
Independent	Mike Whatley	2,409	8.1	N/A
Green	Anne Baker	1,719	5.7	+4.7
Liberal Democrats	Jackie Charlton	1,268	4.2	+0.5
Workers Party	Yas Iqbal	570	1.9	N/A
Communist	Robert Griffiths	309	1.0	N/A
Majority		12,183	40.7	+9.9
Turnout		29,922	42.7	−16.5
Registered electors		70,153		
Labour hold		Swing	−1.7	

Stewart Sutherland was nominated as the Reform UK candidate, but withdrew prior to the close of nominations due to reposting racist content on social media.

=== Elections in the 2010s ===
2019 notional result (Note: Estimate of the 2019 general election result as if the revised boundaries recommended under the 2023 boundary review were in place)
Party	Vote	%
Labour	21,215	50.4
Conservative	8,246	19.6
Brexit Party	7,574	18.0
Plaid Cymru	2,687	6.4
Liberal Democrats	1,576	3.7
Green Party	418	1.0
Independent	378	0.9
Majority	12,969	30.8
Turnout	42,094	59.2
Electorate	71,079	
