= Vaughan (surname) =

Vaughan or Vaughn
- Pronunciation: /vɔːn/ VAWN

Origin
- Origin: Welsh
- Meaning: Small (when of Welsh derivation)
- Region of origin: Wales, Ireland

Vaughan and Vaughn are surnames, originally Welsh, though also used as a form of the Irish surname McMahon. Vaughan derives from the Welsh word bychan, meaning "small", and so corresponds to the English name Little and the Breton cognate Bihan. The word mutates to Fychan (Welsh: [ˈvəχan]), an identifier for a younger sibling or next of kin.

== Notable people with the surname Vaughan ==
=== A ===
- Alfred Jefferson Vaughan Jr. (1830–1899), American civil engineer, planter, soldier and writer
- Alden Vaughan (born 1929), American historian
- Anne Vaughan, Countess of Carbery (1663–1689/90)
- Arky Vaughan (1912–1952), American professional baseball player
- Arthur Owen Vaughan (1863–1919), English-born writer, soldier and Welsh nationalist

=== B ===
- Ben Vaughan (born 1999), English boxer
- Benjamin Vaughan (1751–1835), British politician
- Benjamin Vaughan (bishop) (1917–2003), Bishop of Swansea and Brecon in the Church in Wales
- Benji Vaughan, British psychedelic trance and psybient musician
- Bernard Vaughan (1847–1922), English Roman Catholic clergyman
- Bernard Vaughan (actor) (early 20th century), British silent film actor
- Beryl Vaughan (1919–2016), American actress
- Bob Vaughan (born 1945), British mathematician
- Brandy Vaughan, anti-vaccine activist
- Brian K. Vaughan (born 1976), American comic book and television writer
- Bruce Vaughan (born 1956), American professional golfer
- Byrde M. Vaughan (1862–1941), American lawyer and politician

=== C ===
- Charles John Vaughan (1816–1897), English scholar and churchman
- Clyde Vaughan, American basketball coach and player
- Colin Vaughan (1931–2000), Canadian television journalist, architect, urban activist and politician
- Crawford Vaughan (1874–1947), Australian politician, Premier of South Australia 1915–1917

=== D ===
- Daniel Vaughan (1897–1975), Irish politician and farmer
- David Vaughan (disambiguation), several people
- Denis Vaughan (1926–2017), Australian-born orchestral conductor and multi-instrumentalist
- Diana Vaughan, fictitious character in the 1890s Taxil hoax
- Don Vaughan (ice hockey) (born 1961), Canadian ice-hockey coach and former player
- Don Vaughan (landscape architect) (born 1937), American landscape architect
- Dorothy Vaughan (1910–2008), African American mathematician
- Dustin Vaughan (born 1991), American football player

=== E ===
- Edwin Campion Vaughan (1897–1931), British Army officer and diarist
- Louisa Elizabeth Rolls Vaughan (1810–1853), Welsh Catholic laywoman and mother

=== F ===
- Frankie Vaughan (1928–1999), British singer

=== G ===
- Genevieve Vaughan (born 1939), American expatriate semiotician, peace activist, feminist, and philanthropist
- Gerard Vaughan (British politician) (1923–2003), British psychiatrist and politician
- George Augustus Vaughn Jr. (1897–1989), American fighter ace
- Greg Vaughan (born 1973), American actor

=== H ===
- Hal Vaughan (1928–2013), American author based in France
- Harp Vaughan (1903–1978), American football player
- Harry Vaughan (disambiguation), several people
- Hayley Vaughan, fictional character from American TV series All My Children
- Henry Vaughan (disambiguation), several people
- Herbert Vaughan (1832–1903), English cardinal
- Herbert Millingchamp Vaughan (1870–1948), Welsh author and historian
- Horace Worth Vaughan (1867–1922), American lawyer, jurist, and politician
- Howard Vaughan (John Howard Vaughan, 1879–1955), Australian politician

=== I ===
- Ivan Vaughan (1942–1993), British musician, teacher and author, introduced John Lennon to Paul McCartney

=== J ===
- James Vaughan (disambiguation), several people
- Dame Janet Vaughan (1899–1993), British physiologist, Principal of Somerville College, Oxford
- Jimmie Vaughan (born 1951), American guitarist and singer
- John Vaughan (disambiguation), several people
- Johnny Vaughan (born 1966), English broadcaster and journalist
- Jonathan Vaughn (born 1981), British-American organist and choir director
- Jon the Dentist (born 1965), British music record producer
- Josh Vaughan (born 1986), American football player
- Joshua Vaughan (born 2006), English actor
- Justin Vaughan (born 1967), English-New Zealand doctor and cricket executive

=== K ===
- Kaye Vaughan (1931–2023), Canadian football player
- Keith Vaughan (1912–1977), British painter
- Kenny Vaughan, American guitarist
- Kit Vaughan (born 1953), South African professor of biomedical engineering

=== M ===
- Malcolm Vaughan (1929–2010), Welsh traditional pop music singer and actor
- Mark Vaughan (born 1985), Irish Gaelic footballer
- Martin Vaughan (1931–2022), Australian actor
- Megan Vaughan, British historian
- Michael Vaughan (born 1974), English cricketer
- Mike Vaughan (born 1954), American football player with Oklahoma Sooners
- Murray Vaughan (1899–1986), Canadian philanthropist

=== N ===
- Nigel Vaughan (born 1959), Welsh professional footballer
- Norman D. Vaughan (1905–2005), American dogsled driver and explorer
- Norman Vaughan (comedian) (1927–2002), English comedian

=== P ===
- Paul Vaughan (1925–2014), British journalist and radio and TV presenter
- P. W. Vaughan (1871–1945), Australian bank manager
- Peter Vaughan (disambiguation), several people
- Philip Vaughan (18th century), Welsh inventor of the ball bearing
- Pinkerton R. Vaughn (1839–1866), American Medal of honor recipient

=== Q ===
- Quincy Vaughn (born 2001), Canadian football player

=== R ===
- Ralph Vaughan Williams (1872–1958), English composer
- Rhydian Vaughan (born 1988), Taiwanese-British actor
- Rice Vaughan (died c. 1672), Anglo-Welsh lawyer and economist
- Richard Vaughan (disambiguation), several people
- R. M. Vaughan (born 1965), Canadian poet, novelist and playwright
- Robert Vaughan (disambiguation), several people
- Roger Vaughan (disambiguation), several people
- Rowland Vaughan (disambiguation), several people

=== S ===
- Sarah Vaughan (1924–1990), American jazz singer
- Sarah Vaughan (writer) (born 1972), British journalist and writer
- Scipio Vaughan (c.1784–1840), American artisan
- Scooter Vaughan (born 1989), American ice hockey player
- Stephen Vaughan (disambiguation), several people
- Stevie Ray Vaughan (1954–1990), American guitarist, singer-songwriter and record producer
- Stoll Vaughan, American singer-songwriter

=== T ===
- Terri Vaughan (born 1956), American economist
- Thomas Vaughan (disambiguation), several people
- Tom Vaughan (disambiguation), several people
- Tony Vaughan (footballer) (born 1975), English footballer
- Sir Tudor Vaughan (1870–1929), British diplomat

=== V ===
- Vernon H. Vaughan (1838–1878), American politician
- Victor C. Vaughan (1851–1929), American physician, medical researcher, and AMA President

=== W ===
- William Vaughan (disambiguation), multiple people

== Notable people with the surname Vaughn ==
- Andrew Vaughn (born 1998), American baseball player
- Billy Vaughn (1919–1991), American musician
- Carrie Vaughn (born 1973), American fantasy writer
- Chad Vaughn (born 1980), American weightlifter
- Chico Vaughn (1940–2013), American basketball player
- Chip Vaughn (born 1985), American football safety for the New Orleans Saints
- Countess Vaughn (born 1978), American actress
- Danny Vaughn (born 1961), American rock singer
- Deuce Vaughn (born 2001), American football player
- Edward Vaughn (1934–2024), American politician
- Gloria Vaughn (1936–2020), American politician
- Greg Vaughn (born 1965), American baseball player
- Hilda Vaughn (1898–1957), American actress
- Jacque Vaughn (born 1975), American basketball player and coach
- Jane Vaughn (Degrassi character), fictional character in Degrassi: The Next Generation
- John C. Vaughn (1824–1875), Confederate Brigadier General in the American Civil War
- Jon Vaughn (born 1970), American football running back and kick returner
- Ke'Shawn Vaughn (born 1997), American football player
- Kwame Vaughn (born 1990), American basketball player for Maccabi Haifa
- Matt Vaughn, American college baseball coach
- Matthew Vaughn (born 1971), film producer, director, married to Claudia Schiffer
- Michael Vaughn (disambiguation)
- Mo Vaughn (born 1967), American baseball player
- Ricky Vaughn, fictional character played by Charlie Sheen in Major League and sequels
- Robert Vaughn (1932–2016), American stage, film and television actor
- Robert Vaughn (Montana rancher) (1836–1918), Welsh American and Montana pioneer
- Stephen Vaughn, official at the Office of the United States Trade Representative
- Terri J. Vaughn (born 1969), American actress
- Tom Vaughn (disambiguation), several people
  - Tom Vaughn (musician) (1937–2011), American jazz pianist and Episcopalian priest
  - Tom Vaughn (American football) (1943–2020), former professional American football safety
- Viktor Vaughn, Alias of Rapper MF DOOM
- Vince Vaughn (born 1970), American film actor, screenwriter, producer, comedian and activist
- William J. Vaughn (1834–1912), American academic
- William S. Vaughn (1903–1996), American businessman and philanthropist
- Zemaiah Vaughn (born 2002), American football player

== See also ==
- Vaughan-Lee
- Vaughan (disambiguation)
- Vaughn (disambiguation)
