= William Partridge =

William Partridge is the name of:

- William Ordway Partridge (1861–1930), American sculptor
- William Partridge (New Hampshire official) (1654–1729), English colonial administrator
- William Partridge (soldier) (1858–1930), British soldier
- William Partridge (lacrosse), American lacrosse player
- William Partridge (MP), Member of Parliament for Rochester
- William Partridge (Irish revolutionary) (1874–1917), trade unionist and revolutionary socialist from Sligo, Ireland.
