= John Vaughan (bishop) =

English prelate of the Catholic Church (1853–1925)

The Right Reverend John Stephen Vaughan
- Auxiliary Bishop of Salford
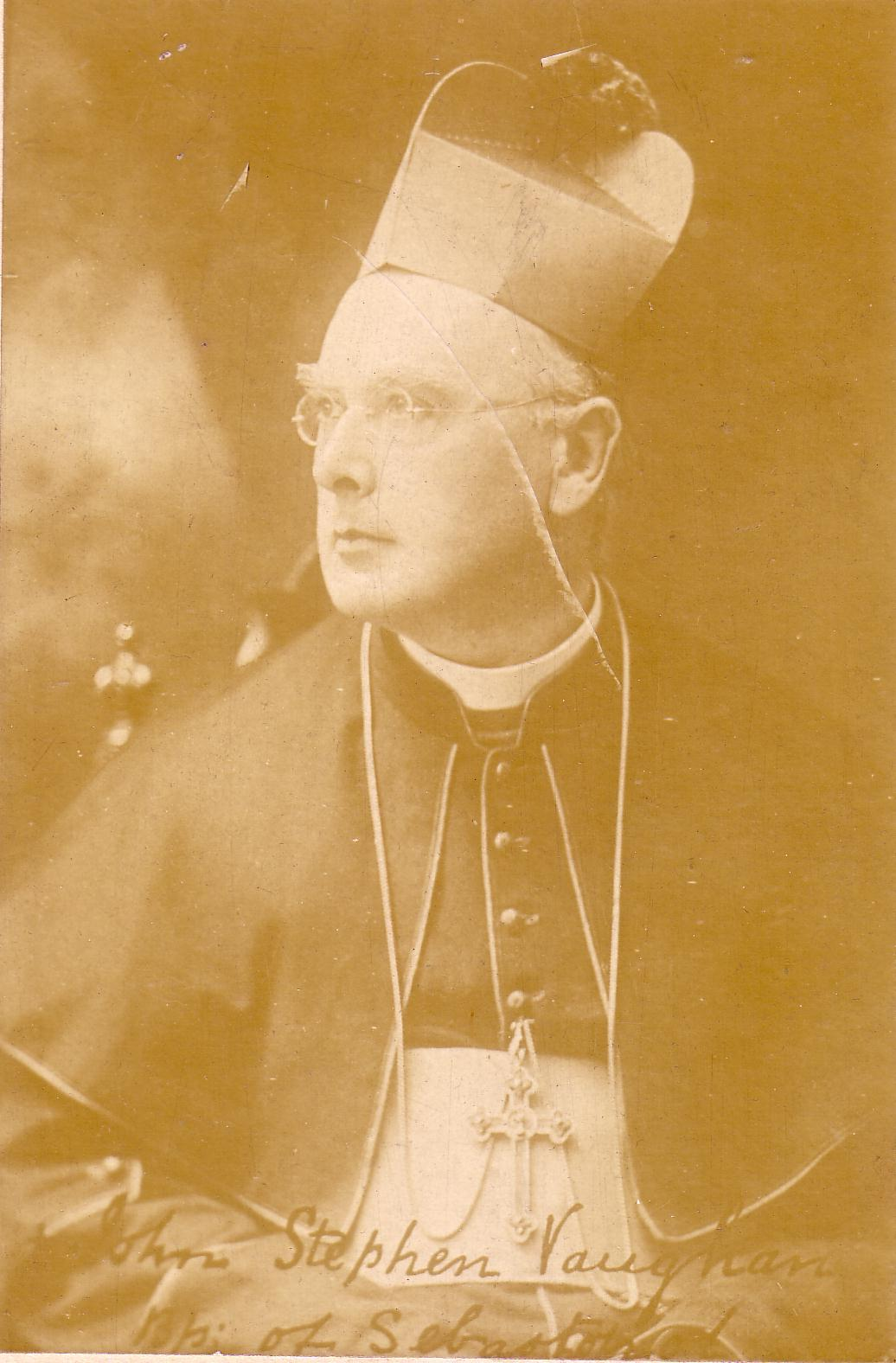
- Church: Catholic
- Diocese: Salford
- Appointed: 1909
- Term ended: 4 December 1925
- Other post: Titular Bishop of Sebastopolis in Armenia

Orders
- Ordination: 5 June 1876 by Herbert Vaughan
- Consecration: 15 August 1909 by Francis Bourne

Personal details
- Born: John Stephen Vaughan; 24 January 1853 Ross-on-Wye, Herefordshire, England
- Died: 4 December 1925 (aged 72) Great Harwood, Lancashire, England
- Buried: Great Harwood

John Stephen Vaughan (24 January 1853 – 4 December 1925) was an English Catholic bishop, brother of Bernard, Roger, and Herbert (Cardinal) Vaughan.

== Early life ==
Vaughan was born 24 January 1853 at Courtfield, near Ross-on-Wye in Herefordshire, England the son of Lieutenant-Colonel John Francis Vaughan, of an old recusant (Roman Catholic) family, the Vaughans of Courtfield, Herefordshire. His mother, Eliza Rolls from The Hendre, Monmouthshire, was a Catholic convert and intensely religious. All five of the Vaughan daughters became nuns, while six of the eight sons took Holy Orders and became priests. John Vaughan studied at St. Gregory's College, and at the English College Bruges, then finally at Rome, before being ordained priest 4 June 1876 at Salford Cathedral by his brother Bishop Herbert Vaughan.

== Career ==
Immediately after ordination Fr Vaughan was appointed to the staff of the recently opened St. Bede's College as Professor of Mathematics, however he resigned in November of that same year following a breakdown in health and was invited by his brother Bishop Roger Vaughan to come and undertake Missionary work in Australia. He returned to England in July 1879 and rejoined the staff of St Bede's in his former role as Professor of Mathematics, where he remained until July 1886.

In 1886, Fr Vaughan was invited by his brother Fr Kenelm Vaughan to join him at his new venture 'The House of Expiation' in Chelsea, London. In 1896, he was appointed domestic prelate to the Papal Court with the title Monsignor and in 1898 became Canon of Westminster. Between 1890 and 1903, he organized free Catholic lectures in various public halls in London. He resided in Rome from 1904 to 1907, and then undertook a preaching tour in the United States and Canada.

In 1909, Monsignor Vaughan returned to England and was sent back to the Diocese of Salford to assist Bishop Louis Charles Casartelli as his auxiliary bishop, he was assigned the title of Titular Bishop of Sebastopolis and was consecrated in Westminster Cathedral on the 5 August 1909. Coming to Manchester he initially resided at Xaverian College until 1912 when he returned to St. Bede's College as Rector. In 1915 he took up residence at St Joseph's College, Upholland near Wigan. In 1920 became Parish Priest at St Hubert's Church in Great Harwood where he died five years later on 4 December 1925 at the age of seventy-two.

== Published works ==
- Thoughts for all times (1899)
- Concerning the Holy Bible (1904)
- Dangers of the Day (1909)
- The Purpose of the Papacy (1910)
- Sermons For All the Sundays, and for the Chief Feasts Throughout the Year (1919)

== Bibliography ==
- "Auxiliary Bishops: Bishop John Vaughan 1909 - 1925". Former Bishops of Salford. The Diocese of Salford. Archived from the original on 12 November 2016.
- "Bishop John Stephen Vaughan". Catholic-Hierarchy. 9 October 2022.
- "Death Index: Vaughan, John S." FreeBMD. ONS.
