= James Vaughan =

James Vaughan may refer to:

- James Vaughan (priest), Dean of Achonry, Ireland, from 1662 to 1683
- James Vaughan (magistrate) (1814-1906), British magistrate
- James David Vaughan (1864–1941), American musician
- James Churchill Vaughan (1893–1937), Nigerian physician
- James H. Vaughan (1934–1996), Canadian politician
- James J. Vaughan (1870–1935), American composer
- James Vaughan (footballer, born 1986), English right-back
- James Vaughan (footballer, born 1988), English former footballer
- James Vaughan (police officer), chief constable of Dorset Police
- James Vaughan, creator of the video game Plague Inc.

== See also ==
- James Vaughn (disambiguation)
- Jim Vaughan (1868-?}, Welsh footballer
- Jimmie Vaughan (born 1951), American musician
