= Ross-on-Wye =

Market town in Herefordshire, England

Coordinates: 51.914°N 2.587°W

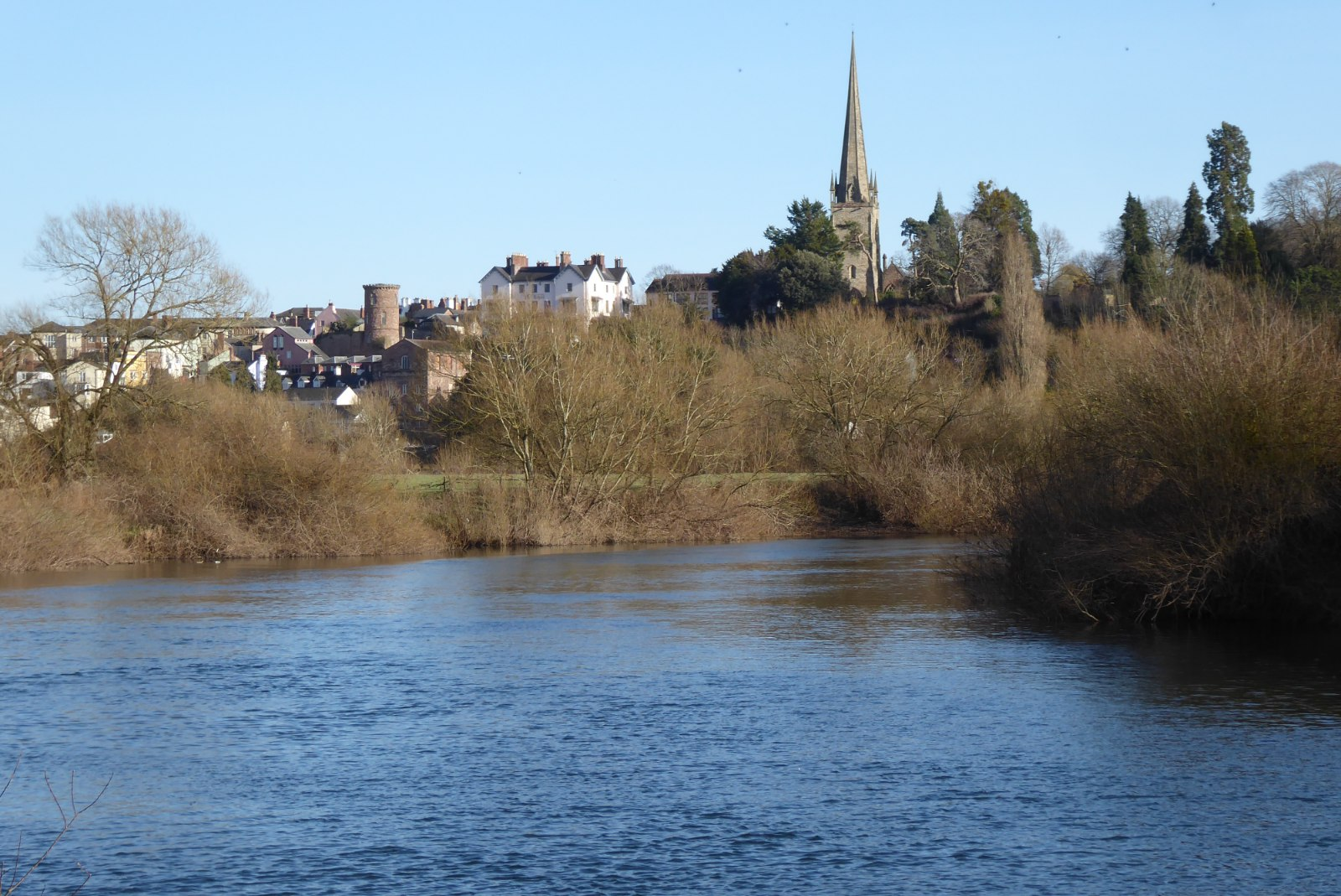
- The River Wye and Ross-on-Wye

- Location within Herefordshire
- Interactive map showing the parish boundary
- Population: 10,990 (2021 census)
- OS grid reference: SO597241
- Unitary authority: Herefordshire
- Ceremonial county: Herefordshire
- Region: West Midlands
- Country: England
- Sovereign state: United Kingdom
- Post town: Ross-on-Wye
- Postcode district: HR9
- Dialling code: 01989
- Police: West Mercia
- Fire: Hereford and Worcester
- Ambulance: West Midlands
- UK Parliament: Hereford and South Herefordshire

Ross-on-Wye is a market town and civil parish in Herefordshire, England, near the border with Wales. It lies in the south-east of the county, on the River Wye and on the northern edge of the Forest of Dean, approximately 11 miles (18 km) southeast of Hereford. The parish had a population of 10,990 at the 2021 census.

== History ==
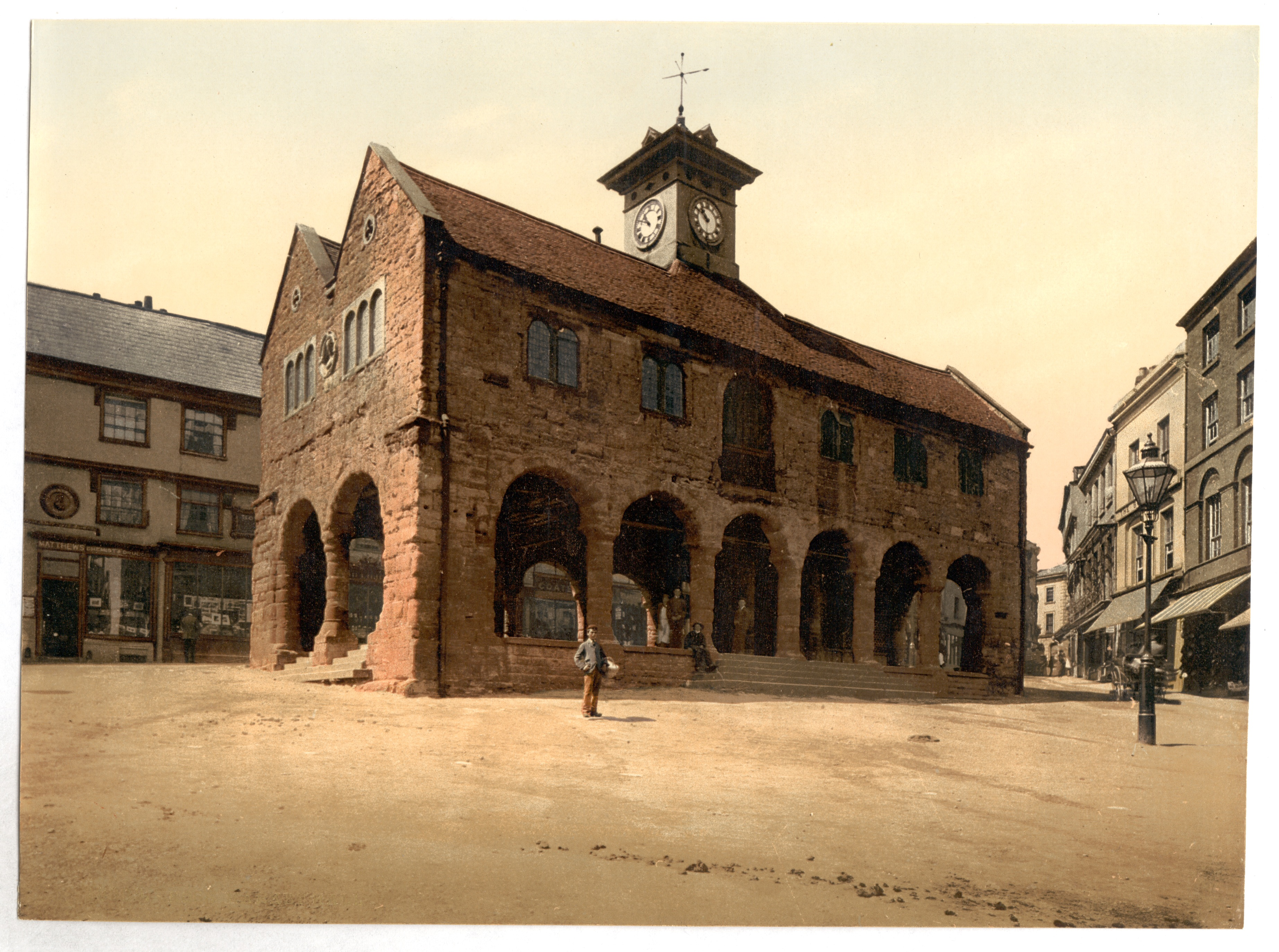
The Market House in 1890 (photochrom)

The name "Ross" is derived from the Welsh or Celtic for a "promontory". It was renamed "Ross-on-Wye" in 1931 by the General Post Office, due to confusion with other places of the same or similar name (such as Ross in Scotland).

Ross-on-Wye promotes itself as "the birthplace of British tourism". In 1745, the rector, Dr John Egerton, started taking friends on boat trips down the valley from his rectory at Ross. The Wye Valley's attraction was its river scenery, its precipitous landscapes, and its castles and abbeys, which were accessible to seekers of the "picturesque". In 1782, William Gilpin's book Observations on the River Wye was published, the first illustrated tour guide to be published in Britain. Once it had appeared, demand grew so much that by 1808 there were eight boats making regular excursions along the Wye, most of them hired from inns in Ross and Monmouth. By 1850, more than 20 visitors had published their own accounts of the Wye Tour, and the area was established as a tourist destination.

== Governance ==
Most local government functions are vested in Herefordshire Council, the unitary authority covering the county. Ross Town Council, with 18 councillors, six each from the Ross North, West and East wards, has the powers of a parish council. The mayor for 2025-26 is councillor Linden Delves. Ross Rural was merged into the civil parish on 1 April 2015. Since the May 2023 local elections, the town council has a majority of Liberal Democrats (twelve), with one Conservative and five Independents.

The town is part of the Hereford and South Herefordshire parliamentary constituency, currently represented in the House of Commons by the Conservative MP Jesse Norman.

== Demographics ==
At the 2021 census, the civil parish had a population of 10,990 people in 5,197 households.

Census population of Ross-on-Wye parish
Census	Population	Female	Male	Households	Source
2001	9,074	4,764	4,310	4,032	
2011	9,574	5,000	4,574	4,329	
2021	10,990	5,702	5,288	5,197	

== Landmarks ==
=== Parish church ===
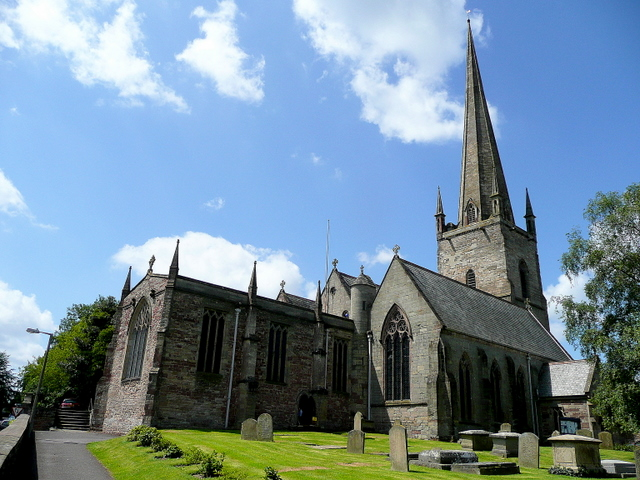
St Mary's Church, seen from the north-east

The 700-year-old Church of England parish church, St Mary's, is the town's most prominent landmark. Its tall pointed spire is visible when approaching the town from all directions. The church holds several distinctive tombs, one of which – that of William Rudhall (who died in 1530) – is one of the last great alabaster sculptures from the specialist masons of Nottingham, whose work was prized across medieval Europe. Rudhall was responsible for the repair of the almshouses to the north west of the church, in 1575. Another tomb is of John Kyrle, a prominent figure in 18th-century Ross, whose name has been taken by the town's secondary school. He is also recalled in one of the town's notable inns, The Man Of Ross, and there is a fine painting of him, by an unknown artist, in the Corn Exchange in the High Street.

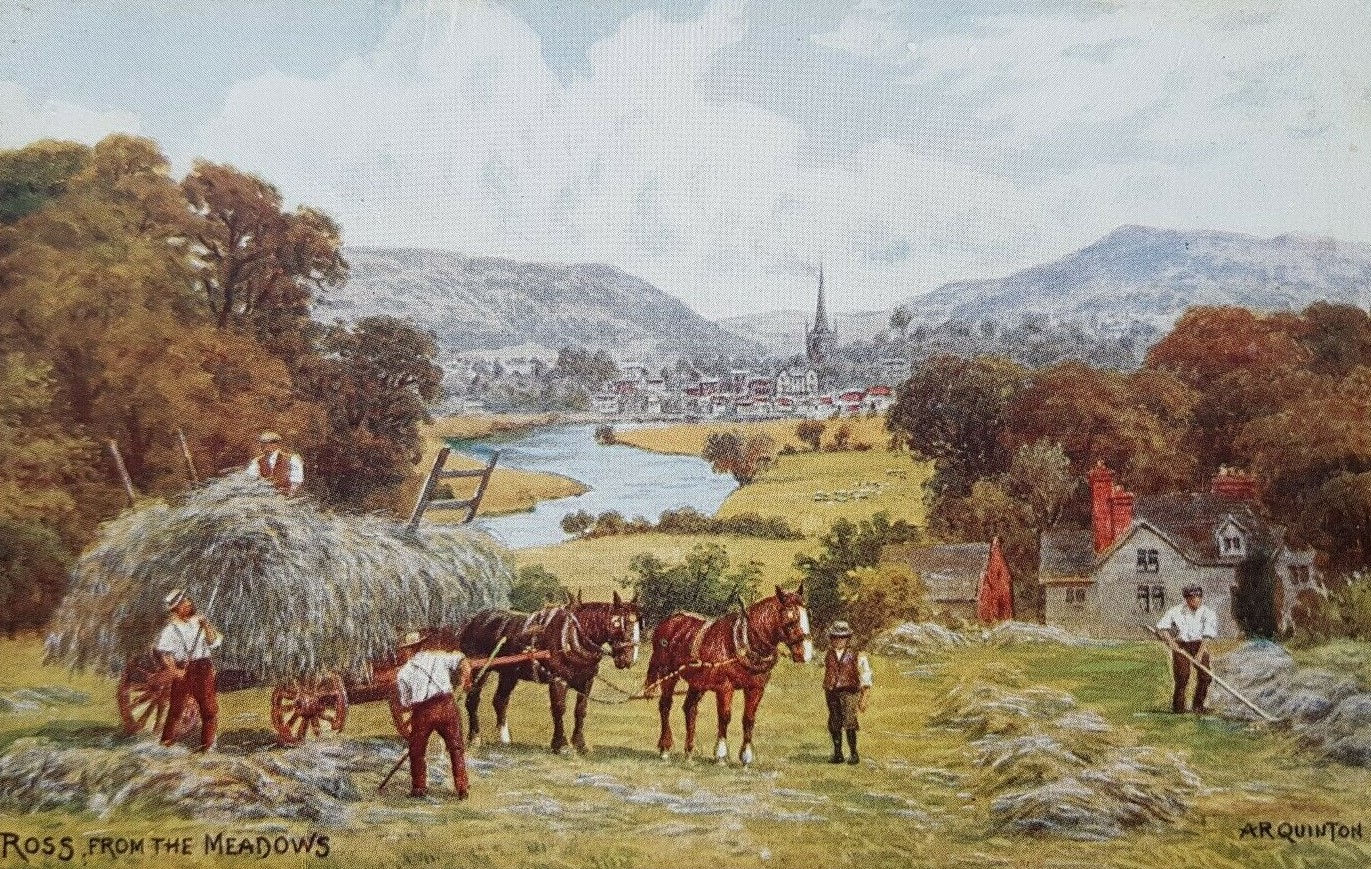
A. R. Quinton, Ross from the Meadows, watercolour c. 1920

=== United Reformed, Methodist and Baptist churches ===
The Methodist Church in Christ Church in Edde Cross Street has closed permanently. The United Reformed Church congregation, part of the Herefordshire Group, likewise was at Christ Church. The former United Reformed Church in Gloucester Road has now been converted into housing.

Ross Baptist Church is in Broad Street. In 1731 the Baptists built Ryeford Chapel at Weston under Penyard, but in 1817 worshippers from Ross decided to separate. They purchased the site on Broad Street and constructed a chapel with an attached graveyard. The original chapel was replaced in 1879, with much of the funding from Thomas Blake, a local philanthropist. In 2017, the current Baptist church in Ross marked its 200th anniversary.

=== Plague Cross ===
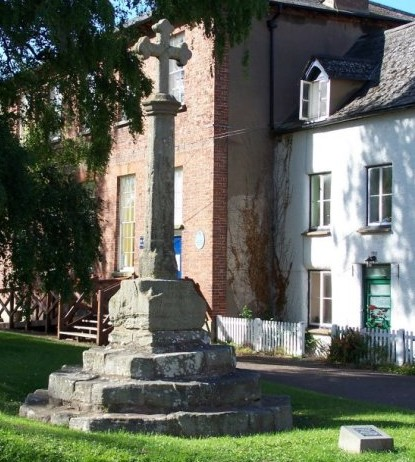
The Plague Cross

The Plague or Corpse Cross was erected in the churchyard of St Mary's in 1637 as a memorial to 315 townsfolk who died that year of the plague and were buried nearby in a plague pit, at night and without coffins.

By 1896, the Plague Cross had fallen into disrepair and the top was missing. It was later restored. Since 1952, it has been listed as a grade II* edifice, and since 1997 it has been a scheduled monument.

=== The Prospect ===
The Prospect was created by John Kyrle, who rented the land from the Marquess of Bath in 1696 and turned it into a garden and walkway. In 2008, heavy rain uncovered Roman remains that were excavated under the site.

The Prospect provides a public garden opposite the church, containing trees dedicated to local people, a VE Day beacon and a war memorial. It offers a view of the famous horseshoe bend in the Wye and as far west as the Black Mountains.

== Culture and community ==
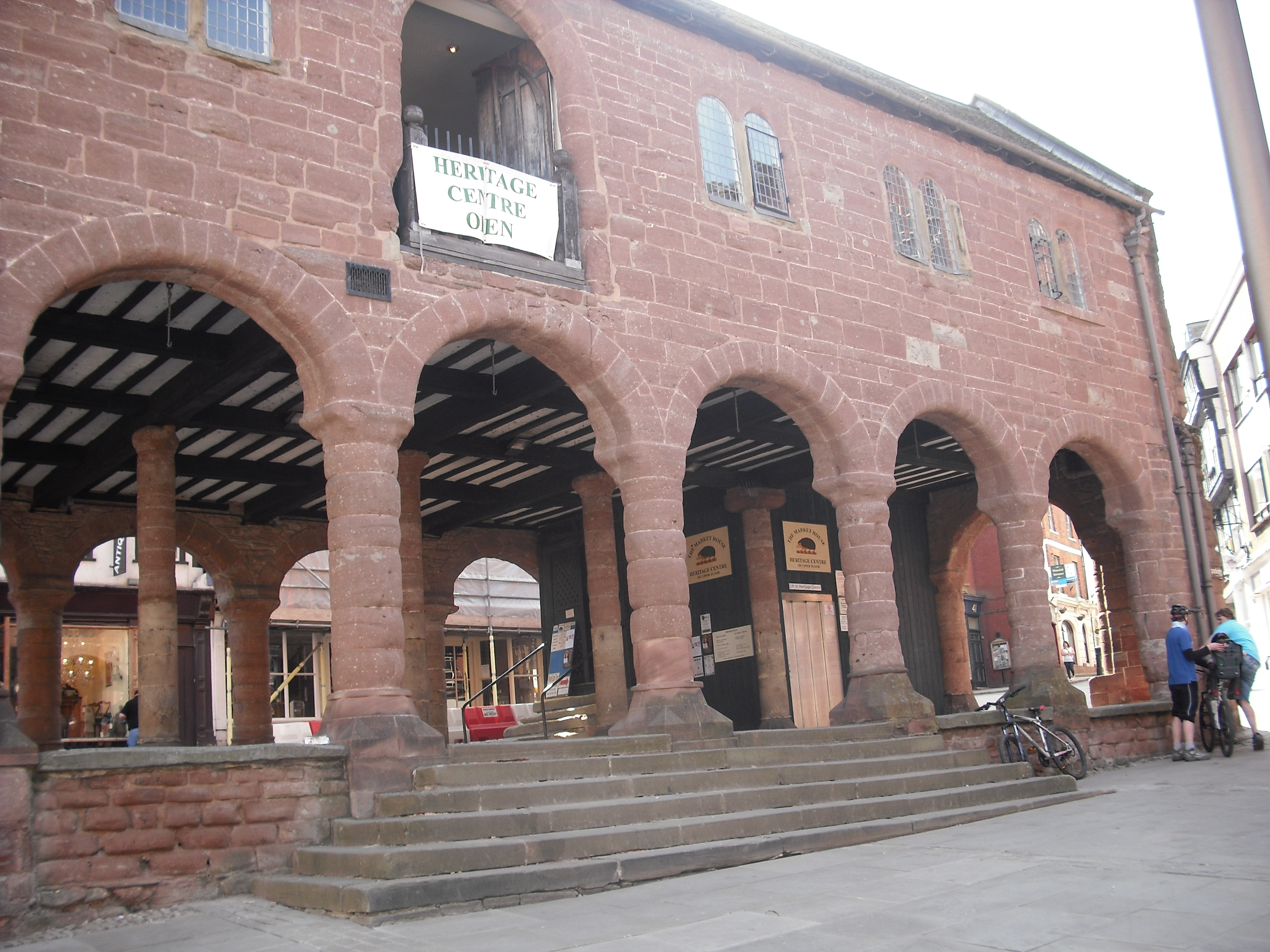
The Market House

The town is known for locally owned shops and a market square with a market hall. Thursday and Saturday markets are held at the red sandstone Market House building in the town centre. This was built between 1650 and 1654 to replace a probably wooden Booth Hall. The upper storey now houses an arts and crafts centre.

The town's small theatre, The Phoenix, shows films once a month, along with plays and other arts events.

The ruins of Wilton Castle, to the west of the town, have been restored and opened to visitors. The town has a number of sculptures by Walenty Pytel, with the left bank of the Wye showing two of these. Despite the common belief that both depict swans, one in fact shows ducks.

Ross-on-Wye has three twin towns, Betzdorf in Germany, Condé-sur-Noireau in France (since 1978), and Namutumba in Uganda.

== Transport ==
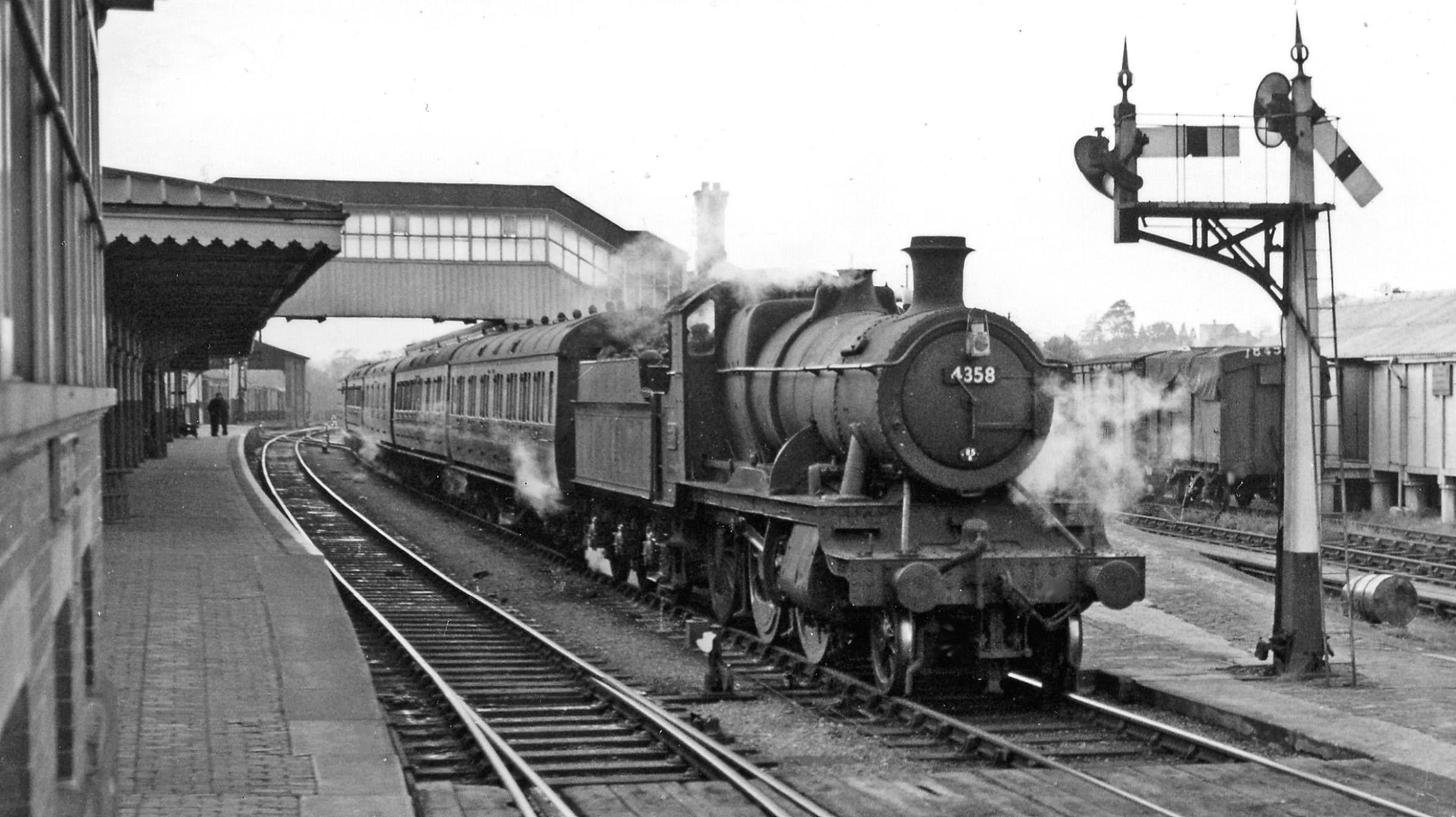
Ross-on-Wye station, with Hereford – Gloucester train in 1958

The former Ross-on-Wye railway station was at a junction on the Hereford, Ross & Gloucester Railway north of the town. It was the terminus of the Ross & Monmouth Railway, which joined the Hereford, Ross and Gloucester just south of the station. Opened on 1 June 1855, the line was merged into the Great Western Railway on 29 July 1862 and in 1869 converted from broad gauge to standard gauge in a five-day period. A line to Tewkesbury was authorised by Parliament in 1856, but never built.

Under the Beeching cuts, the lines to Ross closed in stages up to 1964. The brick station has been demolished and the site redeveloped into an industrial estate, on which the brick goods and engine sheds still stand.

The nearest railway stations are Ledbury on the Cotswold Line and Gloucester on the Birmingham & Gloucester Railway.

Ross-on-Wye is a primary destination on Great Britain's road network. The A40 road bypasses the town to its north and is signed westbound towards Monmouth, as well as eastbound towards Gloucester. It also interchanges with the northbound A49 to Hereford and the A449 running northeast to Ledbury. To the east is the end of the M50 motorway, sometimes called the Ross Spur or Ross Motorway, which links with the M5.

Stagecoach West and Nick Maddy Coaches provide regular bus services. Stagecoach West operates hourly route 33 through Ross between Gloucester and Hereford, while Nick Maddy Coaches operates hourly route 40 serving residential streets across town. National Express also operate a twice daily service to and from London on its 445 route.

== Media ==
Local news and television programmes are provided by BBC West Midlands and ITV Central. Television signals are received from the Ridge Hill and the local relay transmitters.

Local radio stations are BBC Hereford and Worcester, Hits Radio Herefordshire & Worcestershire, Greatest Hits Radio Herefordshire & Worcestershire and Sunshine Radio.

The town is served by the local newspapers The Ross Gazette and Hereford Times.

== Climate ==
Ross-on-Wye experiences a typically British oceanic climate (Köppen: Cfb), with pleasant summers and fairly mild, damp winters.

The record high temperature is 36.8°C (97.5°F), which occurred on 13 August 2026, while the record low temperature is -18.3°C (0.5°F), which occurred on 14 February 1929.

On average, the wettest month is October, with an average of 83.7mm (3.30 inches) of rainfall, while the driest month is July, with an average of 51.4mm (2.02 inches) of rainfall. As is typical with oceanic climates, there is not much seasonal variation in rainfall; despite autumn and winter typically being wetter than spring and summer, precipitation or a lack thereof can occur throughout the year.

The Wye Valley area, in which Ross is situated, is sheltered from strong winds due to its inland and low-elevation location leeward of high terrain. This allows warmer summer maxima than would otherwise be expected for this area of the UK, and as a result, multiple vineyards can be found in the surrounding countryside.

Significant snow is rare in the region; though light snowfalls typically occur at least once per winter when the winds originate from the north or east, a quick thaw often sets in afterwards.

A Met Office weather station provides long-term climate data for the town. Meteorological readings have been taken in Ross since 1858; the Ross-on-Wye weather station holds some national records.

Climate data for Ross-on-Wye (1991-2020 normals, extremes 1914-present)
Month	Jan	Feb	Mar	Apr	May	Jun	Jul	Aug	Sep	Oct	Nov	Dec	Year
Record high °C (°F)	15.2 (59.4)	18.3 (64.9)	22.8 (73.0)	25.6 (78.1)	32.8 (91.0)	35.6 (96.1)	36.4 (97.5)	36.8 (98.2)	30.5 (86.9)	27.5 (81.5)	19.4 (66.9)	15.7 (60.3)	36.8 (98.2)
Mean daily maximum °C (°F)	8.0 (46.4)	8.7 (47.7)	11.2 (52.2)	14.2 (57.6)	17.5 (63.5)	20.3 (68.5)	22.3 (72.1)	21.7 (71.1)	19.1 (66.4)	14.8 (58.6)	10.9 (51.6)	8.3 (46.9)	14.8 (58.6)
Daily mean °C (°F)	5.1 (41.2)	5.4 (41.7)	7.2 (45.0)	9.6 (49.3)	12.6 (54.7)	15.5 (59.9)	17.5 (63.5)	17.1 (62.8)	14.7 (58.5)	11.2 (52.2)	7.8 (46.0)	5.4 (41.7)	10.8 (51.4)
Mean daily minimum °C (°F)	2.2 (36.0)	2.2 (36.0)	3.3 (37.9)	5.0 (41.0)	7.8 (46.0)	10.7 (51.3)	12.7 (54.9)	12.5 (54.5)	10.3 (50.5)	7.7 (45.9)	4.6 (40.3)	2.4 (36.3)	6.8 (44.2)
Record low °C (°F)	−17.5 (0.5)	−18.3 (−0.9)	−14.4 (6.1)	−4.5 (23.9)	−2.8 (27.0)	0.6 (33.1)	3.4 (38.1)	2.2 (36.0)	−2.8 (27.0)	−7.3 (18.9)	−11.2 (11.8)	−14.5 (5.9)	−18.3 (−0.9)
Average precipitation mm (inches)	75.9 (2.99)	55.3 (2.18)	53.0 (2.09)	51.9 (2.04)	56.8 (2.24)	56.0 (2.20)	51.4 (2.02)	64.1 (2.52)	56.5 (2.22)	83.7 (3.30)	79.6 (3.13)	80.1 (3.15)	764.3 (30.09)
Average precipitation days (≥ 1.0 mm)	12.0	9.7	9.5	9.9	9.1	8.2	8.5	9.1	9.1	11.6	12.2	12.1	121.1
Mean monthly sunshine hours	54.6	77.1	119.1	166.0	203.7	200.5	210.5	189.4	143.7	103.6	63.0	47.1	1,578.3
Source 1: Met Office
Source 2: Starlings Roost Weather

== Notable people ==
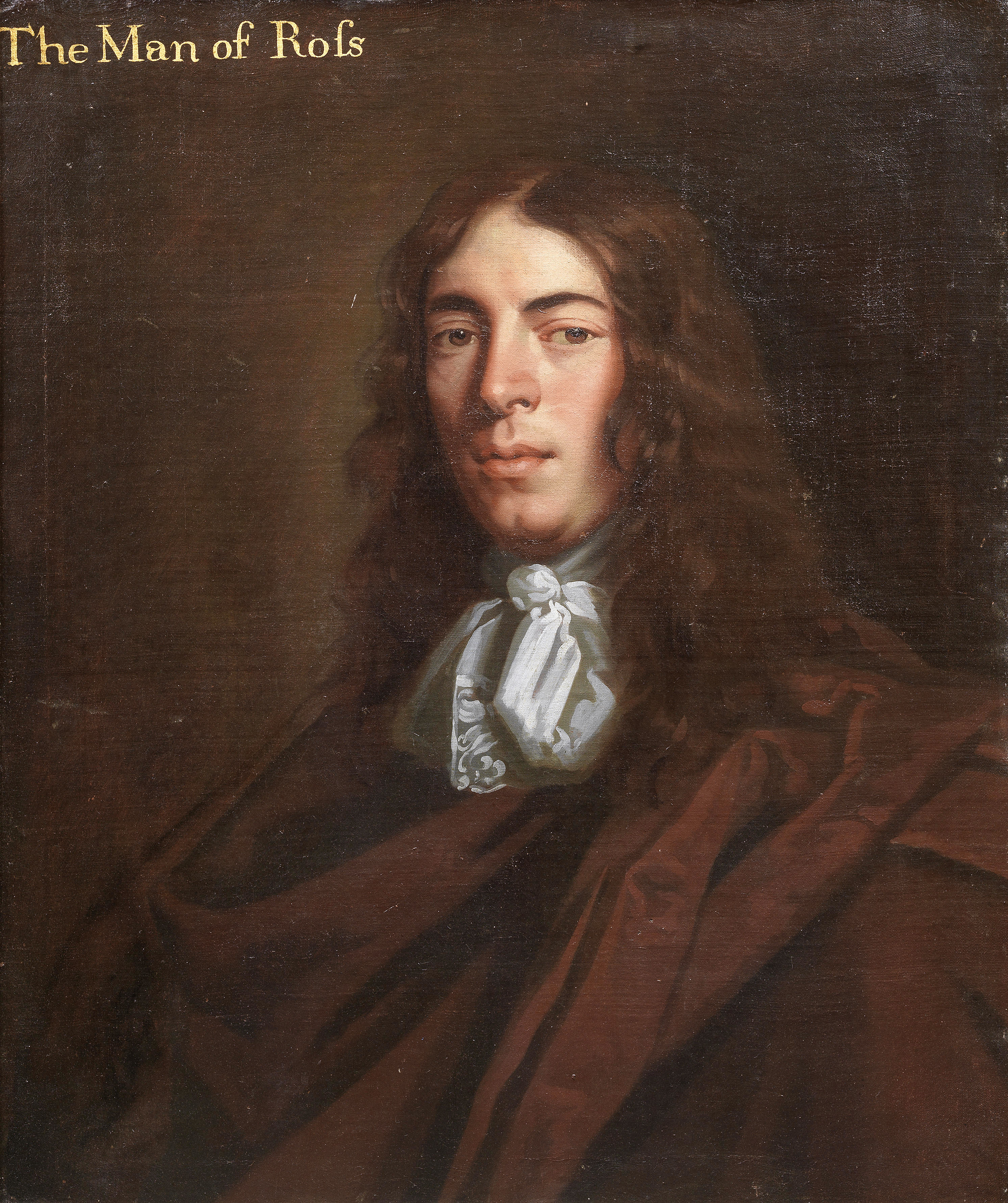
John Kyrle, 17th C.

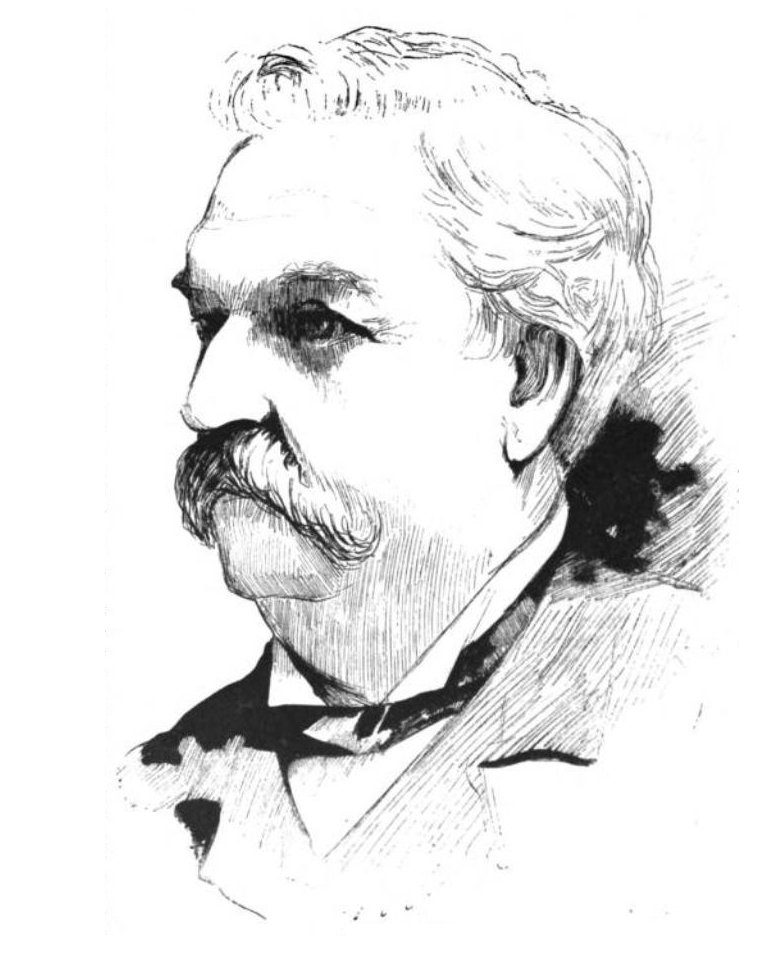
Henry Edwards, ca. 1886

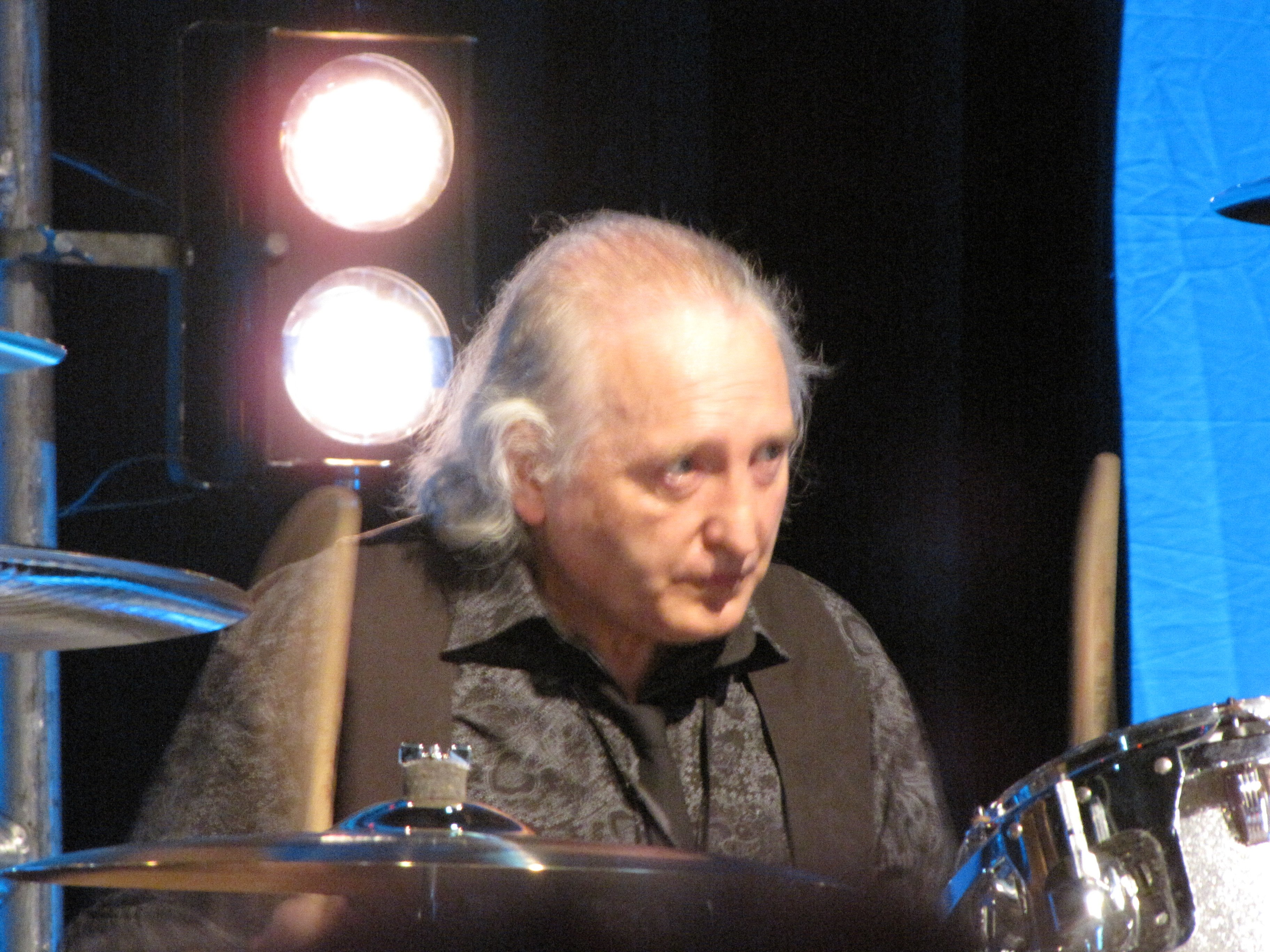
Dale Griffin, Mott the Hoople, 2009

People who were born in Ross, or have lived in the town, include:

- Richard Amerike (c. 1440–1503) also known as Richard ap Meryk, merchant, royal customs officer and later, sheriff of Bristol.
- John Kyrle (1637–1724), philanthropist known as the Man of Ross
- James Cowles Prichard (1786–1848), scientist prominent in anthropology and psychiatry
- Robert Etheridge (1819–1903), an English geologist and palaeontologist.
- Henry Edwards (1827–1891), an English stage actor, writer and entomologist
- Frederick Gordon (1835–1904), hotelier
- Roger Vaughan (1834–1883) from Courtfield, Welsh Bicknor a Benedictine monk of Downside Abbey
- John Vaughan (1853–1925), from Courtfield, Welsh Bicknor an English Catholic bishop
- William Partridge (1858–1930), soldier prominent in the 1879 Zulu war
- Arthur Pugh (1870–1955), president of the Trades Union Congress
- William Henry Squire (1871–1963), member of Royal Academy of Music, cellist, composer, music professor
- Frederick Burrows (1887–1973), Governor of Bengal
- Juxon Barton (1891–1980), twice Governor of Fiji
- William Jackson, 1st Baron Jackson (1893-1954), local fruit farmer, MP for Brecon & Radnor, 1939/1945.
- Noele Gordon (1919–1985), actress, lived locally, 1960s and early 1970s.
- Yvonne Littlewood (1927–2023), television producer, went to school locally.
- Dennis Potter (1935–1994), dramatist, lived and died locally
- Roger Whittaker (1936–2023), singer-songwriter
- Pete Overend Watts (1947–2017), founder member of the Mott the Hoople band
- Dale Griffin (1948–2016), drummer and founder member of Mott the Hoople
- Anthea McIntyre (born 1954), politician who was as a MEP for the West Midlands from 2011 to 2020.

=== Sport ===
- Frank Andrews (1886–1944), rugby union and professional rugby league player, played 4 games for Wales
- Ingram Capper (1907−1986), sports shooter, competed at the 1952 Summer Olympics
- Brian Huggett (1936−2024), a Welsh professional golfer, lives locally
- David Hodges (born 1970), footballer who played 102 games beginning with 85 for Mansfield Town
- Becky Morgan (born 1974), a Welsh professional golfer, lives locally
- Morgan Nelson (born 1999), Welsh rugby union player who has played 49 games for the Cornish Pirates

== Gallery ==
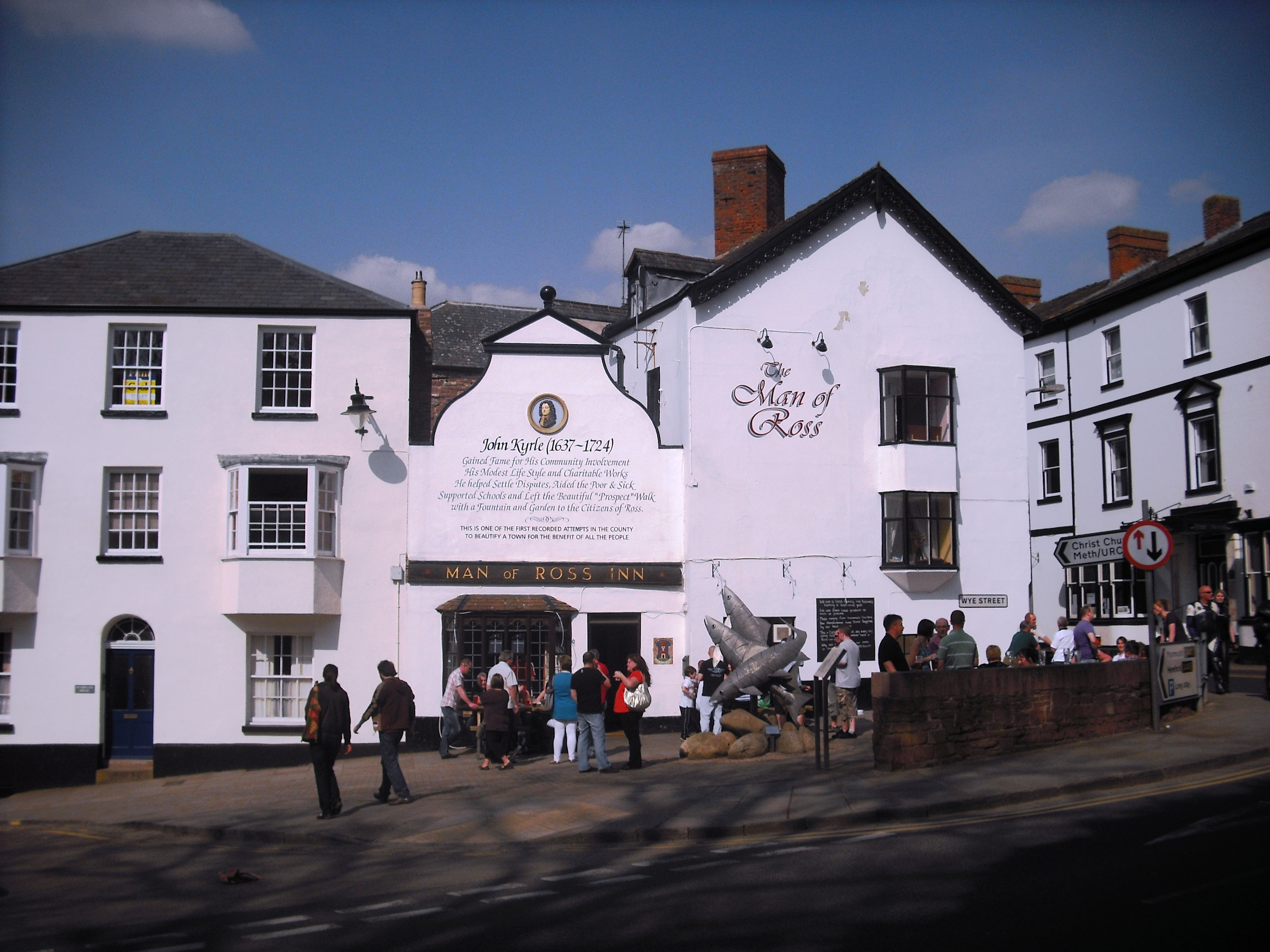
The Man Of Ross inn

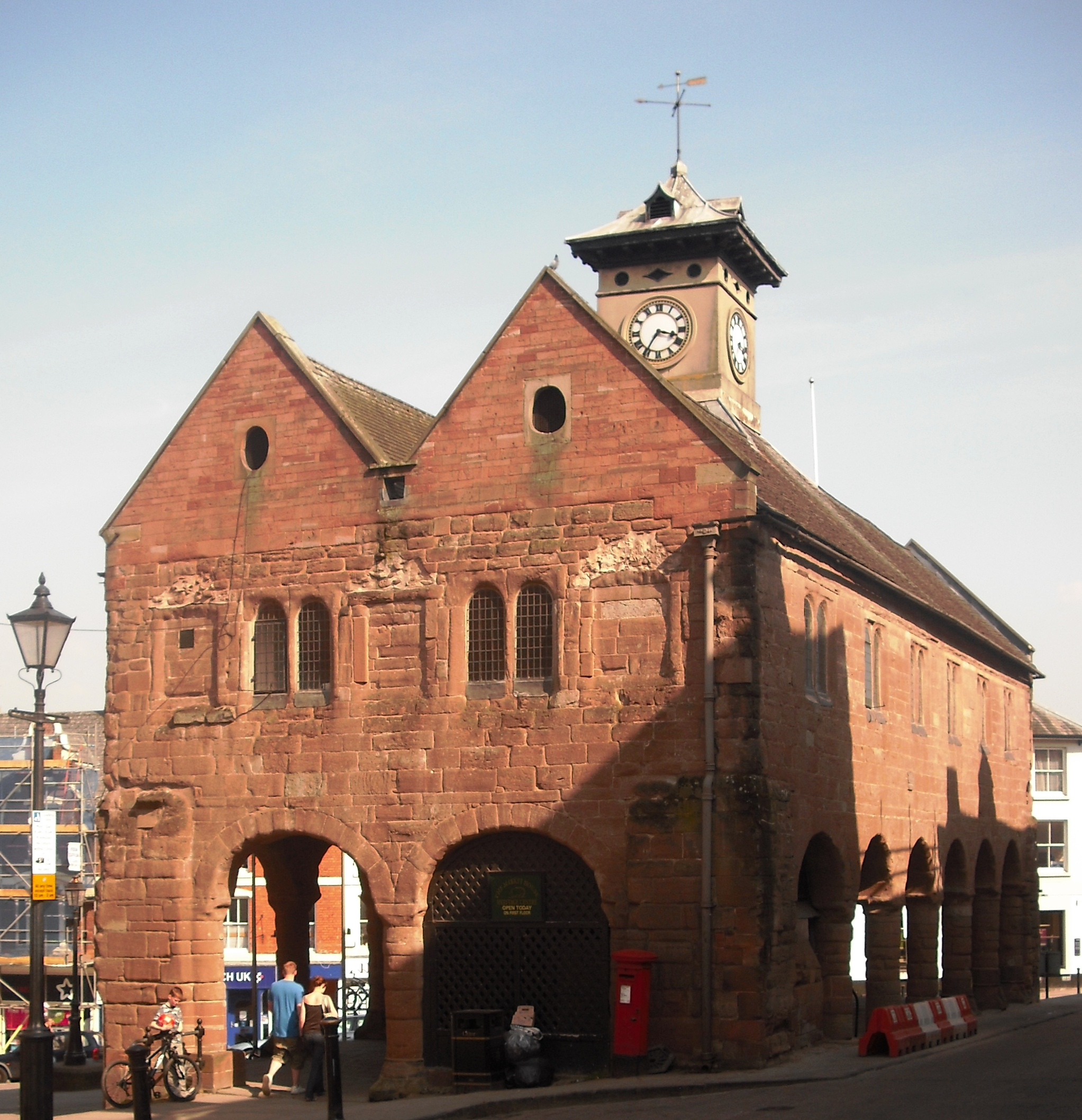
The Market House from the west

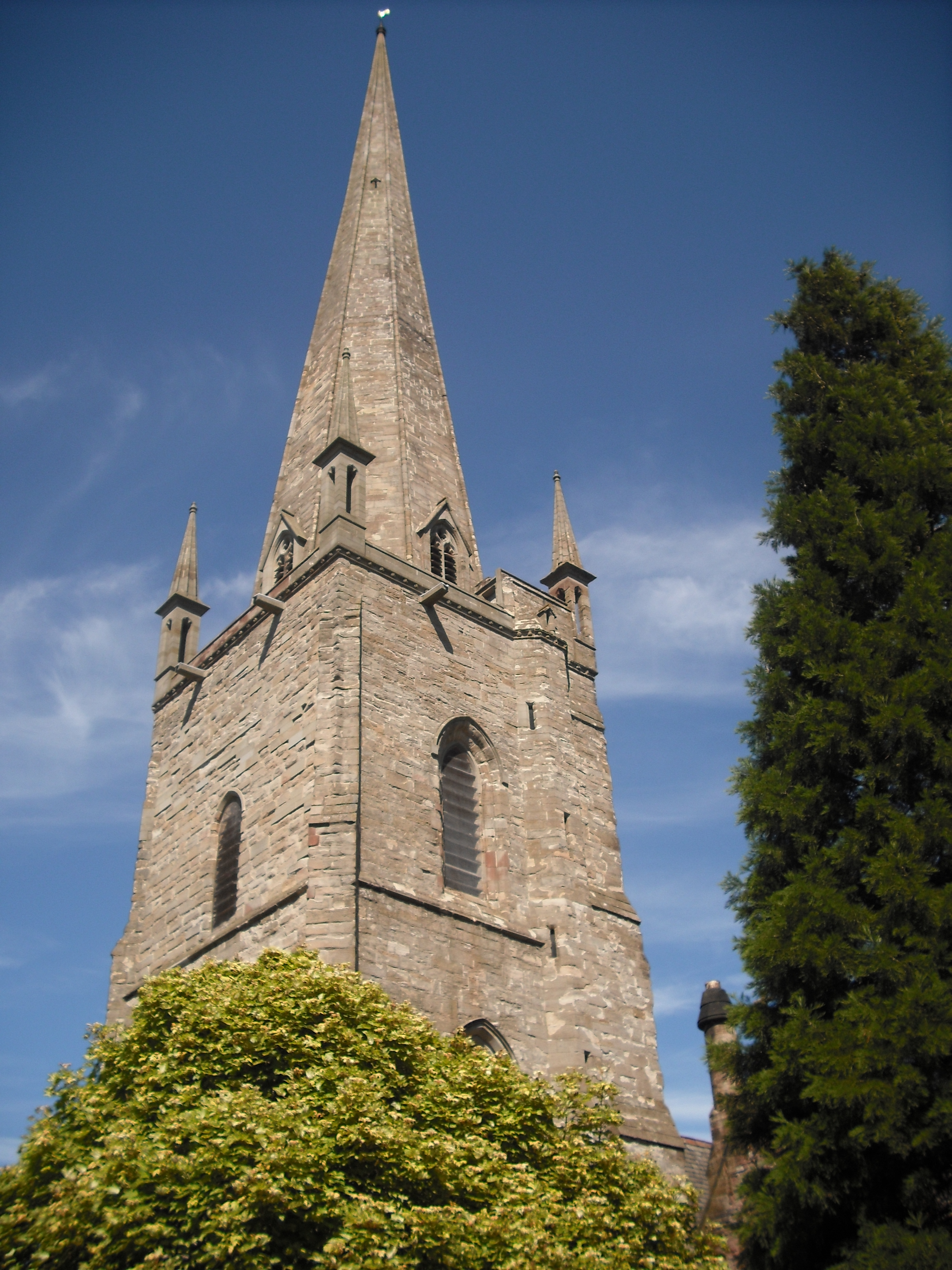
St Mary's Church spire

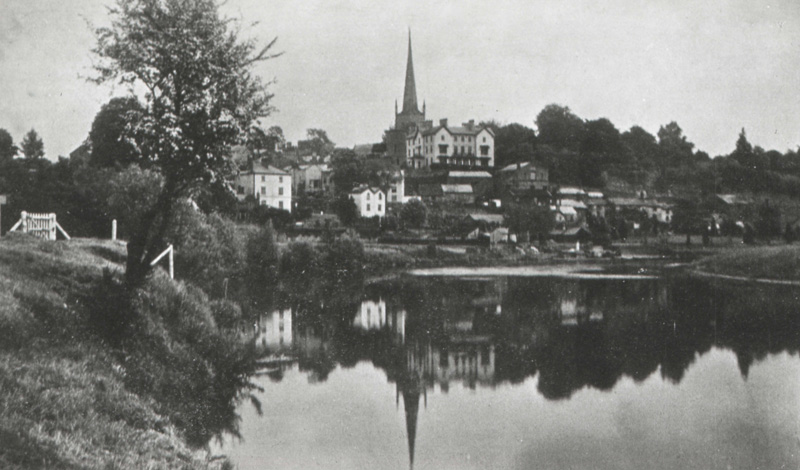
View of the town from the banks of the River Wye

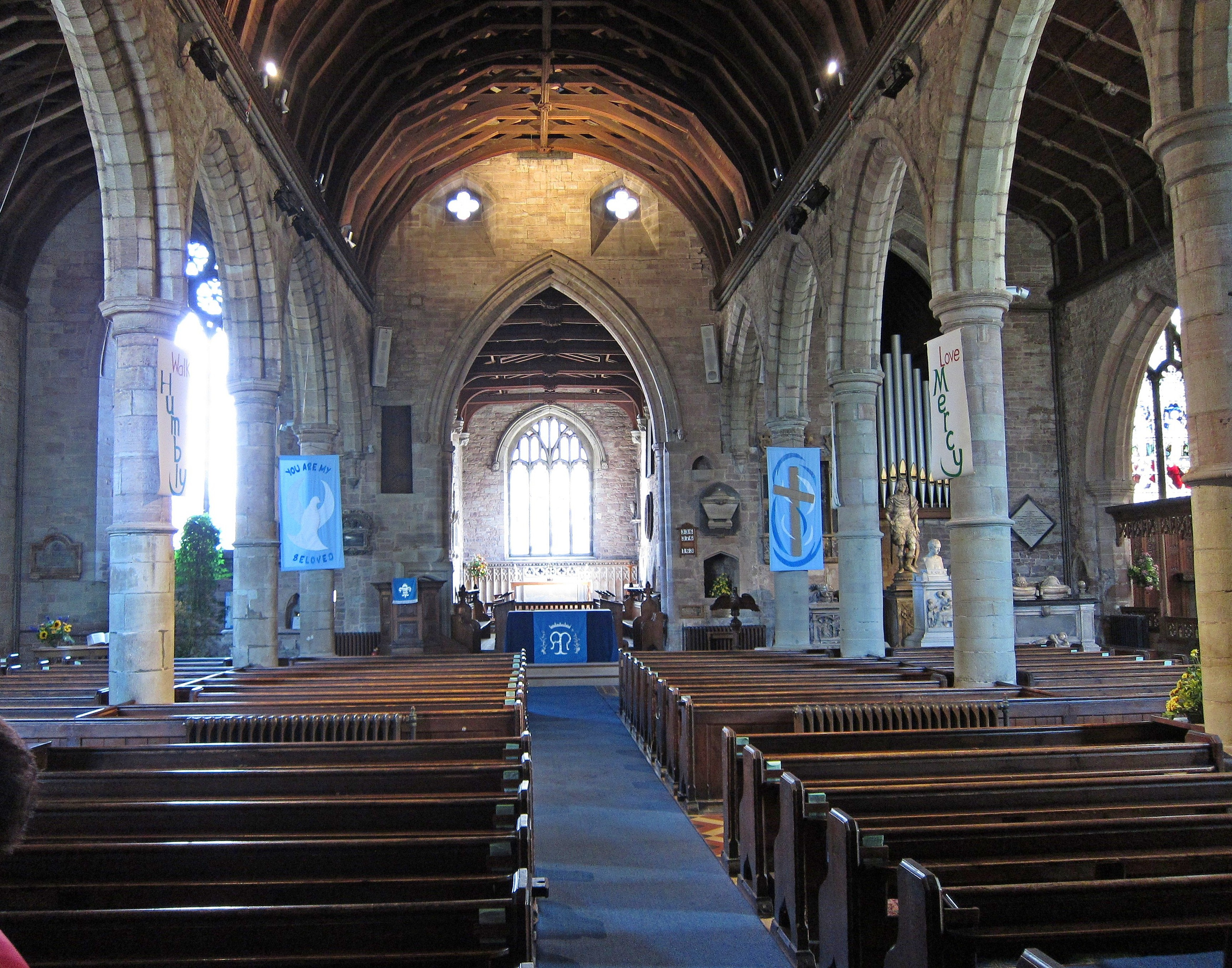
Interior of St Mary's, the parish church

== See also ==
- Archenfield
- John Kyrle High School
- Ross Rowing Club
- The Chase Hotel, Ross-On-Wye (now closed)
