= Bernard Vaughan =

English Catholic Jesuit priest (1847–1922)

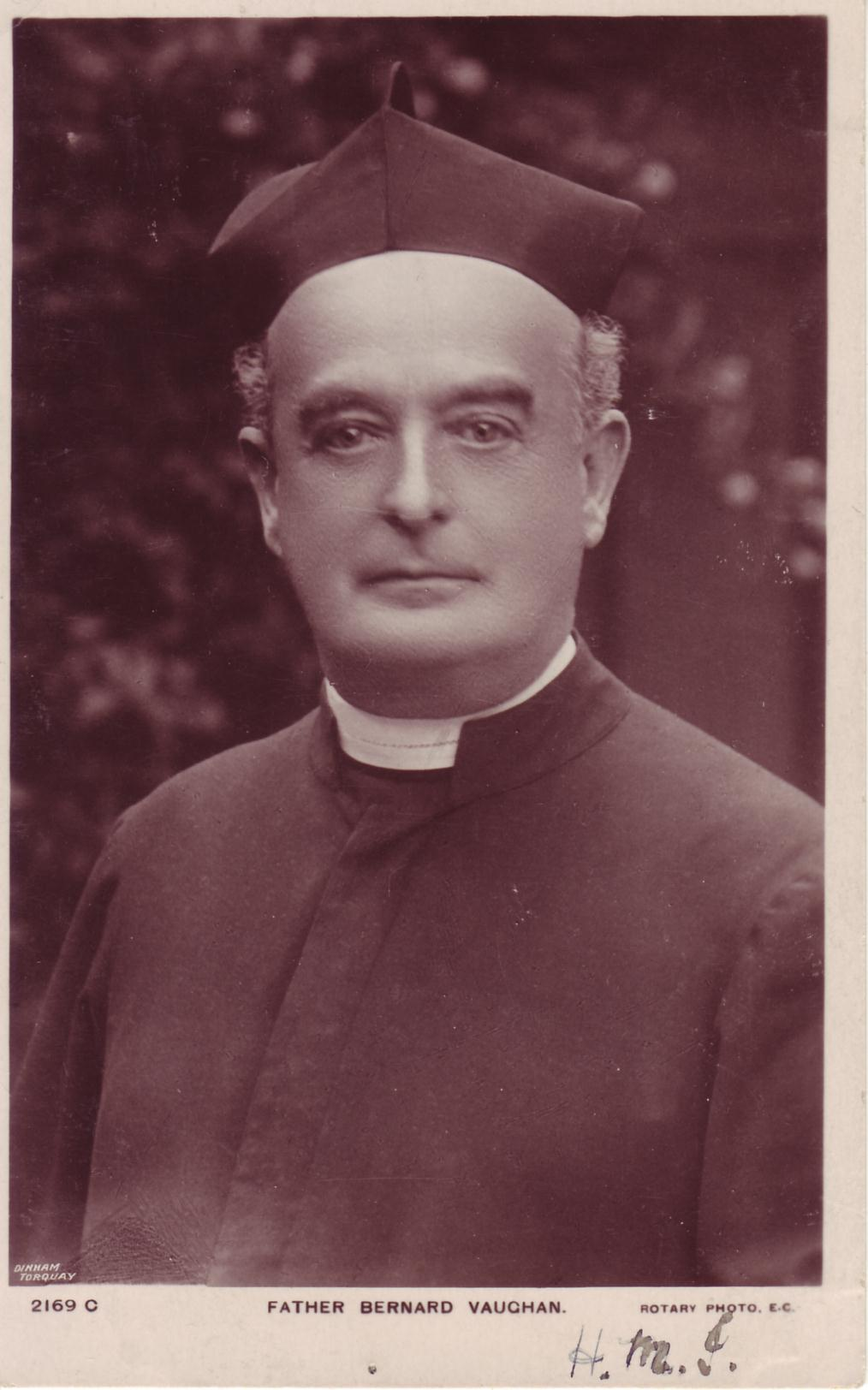
Bernard Vaughan

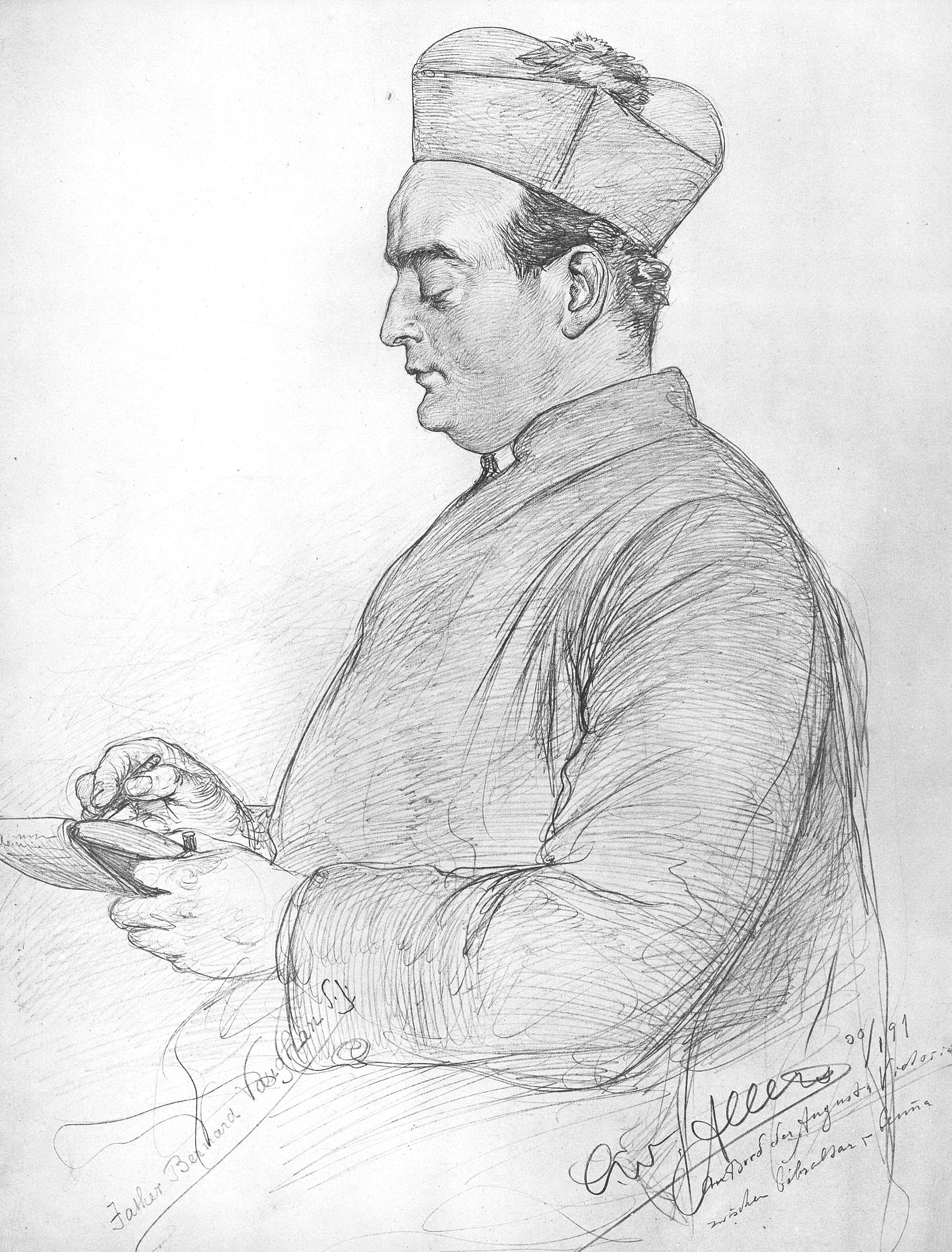
Bernard Vaughan, 1891

Bernard Vaughan, SJ (1847–1922) was an English Catholic priest, brother of Bishops Herbert, Roger and John Stephen Vaughan.

== Biography ==
=== Early life ===
He was born in Herefordshire, the son of Lieutenant-Colonel John Francis Vaughan, of an old recusant (Catholic) family, the Vaughans of Courtfield, Herefordshire. His mother, Eliza Rolls from The Hendre, Monmouthshire, was a Catholic convert and intensely religious. All five of the Vaughan daughters became nuns, while six of the eight sons received Holy orders and became priests. Three were later called as bishops. The eldest son was Herbert, who became Bishop of Salford and then Cardinal Archbishop of Westminster, while other brothers included Roger, later Archbishop of Sydney, Australia, and John, titular bishop of Sebastopolis and auxiliary bishop in the Diocese of Salford, England.

Bernard Vaughan was educated by the Jesuits at Stonyhurst, and became a member of the Society of Jesus. His uncle was also a Jesuit, Richard Vaughan, SJ, who went on to design Sacred Heart Church in Edinburgh.

=== Ministry ===
For 18 years he took a conspicuous part in the religious and civic life of Manchester, particularly as a priest at the Holy Name Church, Manchester. In 1901 went to London, where he worked among the poor of Westminster and in the East End. His sermons on "The Sins of Society" in 1906 attracted large audiences. He preached at Montreal in 1910, traveled in Canada, the United States, and Alaska, and lectured in China, Japan, Italy, and France.

In 1915 he became chaplain to Catholic troops of the British expeditionary army on the Continent.

He died in 1922.

== Works ==
- Socialism from the Christian standpoint: Ten Conferences (New York: Macmillan, 1912)
