= Blaina =

Town in Wales

Coordinates: 51.7667°N 3.1667°W

Blaina: Welsh: Y Blaenau
- Location within Blaenau Gwent
- Population: 4,808
- OS grid reference: SO1908
- Principal area: Blaenau Gwent
- Preserved county: Gwent
- Country: Wales
- Sovereign state: United Kingdom
- Post town: ABERTILLERY
- Postcode district: NP13
- Dialling code: 01495
- Police: Gwent
- Fire: South Wales
- Ambulance: Welsh
- UK Parliament: Blaenau Gwent and Rhymney
- Senedd Cymru – Welsh Parliament: Blaenau Gwent

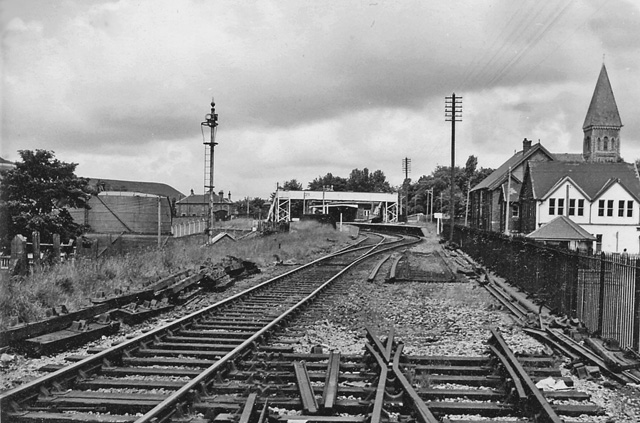
Until 1962 Blaina had a station on the Great Western Railway. These are the remains in 1966

Blaina (/ˈblaɪnə/ BLEYE-nə Welsh: Blaenau Welsh pronunciation: [ˈbleɨnaɨ]) is a town, situated deep within the South Wales Valleys between Brynmawr and Abertillery in the County Borough of Blaenau Gwent, ancient parish of Aberystruth, preserved county of Gwent and historic county of Monmouthshire. The place name is derived from the Welsh word blaenau "uplands". As of 2011, the town has a population of 4,808.

== Welsh language ==
According to the 2011 Census, 6.3% of the ward's 4,808 (303 residents) resident-population can speak, read, and write Welsh. This is above the county's figure of 5.5% of 67,348 (3,705 residents) who can speak, read, and write Welsh.

== The Bells of Rhymney ==
Blaina is mentioned in the folk song The Bells of Rhymney: "And who robbed the miner?" say the grim bells of Blaina, quoting poetry from Idris Davies.

== Notable people ==
See also Category:People from Blaina

- Arthur Fear, opera singer
- Parry Jones, opera singer
- William Partridge, soldier, fought at Rorke's Drift
- Raymond "Ray" Price, rugby union and rugby league footballer of the 1940s and 1950s for Abertillery RFC (RU), Great Britain (RL), Wales, Other Nationalities, Belle Vue Rangers, Warrington, and St. Helens
- Kingsley Jones, rugby union flanker, coach
- Frank Richards, author
- Mike Ruddock, rugby coach
- Florence Eleanor Soper, wife of Bramwell Booth, General of The Salvation Army
- Mostyn Thomas, opera singer
- David Watkins, Welsh rugby union and rugby league international
- Emlyn Watkins, rugby union and rugby league footballer of the 1920s for Wales (RU), Blaina RFC, Wales (RL), and Leeds
- Emlyn A G Watkins, George Medal recipient
