= Le Bihan =

Le Bihan, or Bihan (meaning "small" in Breton), is a surname, and may refer to:

- Clarisse Le Bihan (born 1994), French professional footballer
- Denis Le Bihan (born 1957), French medical doctor, physicist and neuroscientist
- Johann Le Bihan (born 1979), French retired medley swimmer
- Luc Bihan (born 1957), French sculptor, artist, graphic artist and animation director
- Mickaël Le Bihan (born 1990), French professional footballer
- Neil Le Bihan (1976 – 2023), English footballer
- Samuel Le Bihan (born 1965), French actor

The word is cognate with the Welsh word bychan and the surname Vaughan from which it derives.
