= David Vaughn =

David Vaughn may refer to:

- David Vaughn Jr. (born 1952), American basketball player of the 1970s
- David Vaughn III (born 1973), American basketball player of the 1990s

== See also ==
- David Vaughan (disambiguation)
