= Henry Downes (bishop) =

Irish Anglican bishop

Henry Downes (died 1735) was an eighteenth-century Irish Anglican bishop.

He was nominated Bishop of Killala and Achonry on 24 January 1717 and consecrated on 12 May that year. In 1720 he was translated to Elphin, being nominated on 1 May and appointed by letters patent on 12 May 1720. In 1724 he was nominated on 17 March to be the Bishop of Derry and appointed by letters patent on 9 April 1724. In 1725 he was made a member of the Privy Council of Ireland. Finally on 11 January 1727 he was nominated Bishop of Derry and appointed by letters patent on 8 February 1727. He died in office on 14 January 1735.

Church of England titles
Preceded by William Lloyd	Bishop of Killala and Achonry; 1717–1720	Succeeded by Charles Cobbe
Preceded by Simon Digby	Bishop of Elphin; 1720–1724	Succeeded by Theophilus Bolton
Preceded by John Evans	Bishop of Meath; 1724–1727	Succeeded by Ralph Lambert
Preceded by William Nicolson	Bishop of Derry; 1727–1735	Succeeded by Thomas Rundle
