= Roger Vaughan =

Roger Vaughan may refer to:

- Sir Roger Vaughan of Bredwardine (died 1415), Welsh knight, killed at the Battle of Agincourt
- Sir Roger Vaughan of Tretower (died 1471), Welsh knight, son of the above
- Sir Roger Vaughan of Porthamal, Welsh knight, MP for Breconshire, 1553–1562, 1571, and Brecon, 1562–1567
- Roger Vaughan (of Clyro), Welsh MP for Radnorshire, 1572
- Roger Vaughan (Hereford MP) (c. 1641–1672), English politician and courtier, MP for Hereford, 1662–1673
- Roger Vaughan (bishop) (1834–1883), English Benedictine monk of Downside Abbey and Roman Catholic Archbishop of Sydney, 1877–1883
