= Stephen Vaughan =

Stephen Vaughan may refer to:

- Stephen Vaughan Jr. (born 1985), footballer, turned manager
- Stephen Vaughan Sr. (c. 1962–2025), English businessman from Liverpool
- Stephen Vaughan (merchant) (died 1549), English merchant, royal agent and diplomat
- Stevie Ray Vaughan (1954–1990), American guitarist

== See also ==
- Steve Vaughan, American politician
- John Stephen Vaughan (1853–1925), Roman Catholic bishop
- Stephen Vaughn (fl. 2010s), American attorney and bureaucrat
- Stevens Vaughn, American water painter
