= Emlyn A. G. Watkins =

Welsh police officer (1926–2010)

Emlyn A. G. Watkins GM (1926–2010), born in Blaina, Wales, was a British police officer, awarded the George Medal for "outstanding bravery and devotion to duty”.

== Award of the George Medal ==
In 1975 while serving with the Greater Manchester Police as an Inspector in Rusholme, Manchester, he and three other officers tackled three men who had pulled a gun in an Indian restaurant, and was shot in the stomach. The severity of his injuries forced him to leave the police.

When the men were arrested it emerged they were part of an IRA unit sent to assassinate North West VIPs. Five men, part of a Manchester- based IRA terrorist cell, were jailed in 1976 for a total of 627 years.
