= Richard Vaughan =

Richard Vaughan may refer to:

== Politicians ==
- Richard Vaughan (of Corsygedol) (died 1636), Welsh MP for Merioneth in 1628
- Richard Vaughan, 2nd Earl of Carbery (died 1686), Welsh soldier, peer and politician
- Richard Vaughan (judge) (c. 1655–1724), Member of Parliament (MP) for Carmarthen
- Richard Vaughan (MP for Bristol), see Bristol
- Richard Vaughan (died 1734) (c. 1665–1734), Welsh politician

== Sports ==
- Richard Vaughan (badminton) (born 1978), British badminton player
- Richard Vaughan (cricketer) (1908–1966), English cricketer
- Richard Vaughan (ice hockey) (1906–1987), American college ice hockey coach
- Slim Vaughan (Richard Edward Vaughan, 1910–1992), American baseball player

== Others ==
- Richard Vaughan (bishop) (1550–1607), bishop of Chester, 1597–1604
- Richard Vaughan (robotics) (born 1971), British researcher based in Canada
- Richard Vaughan, British film and news narrator noted for episodes on Seconds From Disaster
- Richard Vaughan (historian) (1927–2014), British historian and ornithologist

== See also ==
- Richard Vaughn (disambiguation)
