= Arthur Fear =

Welsh opera singer

Arthur Fear (1902–1984) was a Welsh bass and baritone opera singer.

Born in Cwmcelyn, Blaina in 1902, he worked underground in the colliery until receiving a scholarship to the Royal Academy of Music in 1923, where he studied under Thomas Meux. While a student he attracted attention for his performances in Falstaff and as Hans Sachs in Meistersinger, his first professional role with the British National Opera Company, and one which became his hallmark. After leaving the Royal Academy in 1928, Fear joined the Royal Opera House at Covent Garden. He toured with the Covent Garden Opera Company all over the United Kingdom, later joining the Carl Rosa Opera Company.
