= Thomas Vaughan =

Thomas Vaughan may refer to:

- Thomas Vaughan (footballer) (born 1864), Welsh international footballer
- Thomas Vaughan (MP) (bef. 1479–1543), Member of Parliament for Dover
- Thomas Vaughan (philosopher) (1621–1666), Welsh philosopher
- Thomas Vaughan (pirate) (died 1696), Irish pirate and privateer who served France
- Thomas Vaughan (singer) (1782–1843), English singer
- Thomas Vaughan (died 1483) (c. 1410–1483), Welsh soldier, diplomat, and chamberlain to the eldest son of King Edward IV
- Thomas Vaughan (bodysnatcher) (flourished c. 1827)

== See also ==
- Tom Vaughan (disambiguation)
- Tom Vaughn (disambiguation)
- Thomas Franklin Vaughns (Born 1920), Tuskegee Airman
