= Richard Vaughn =

Richard Vaughn is the name of:

- Ricky Vaughn, character in Major League

== See also ==
- Richard Vaughan (disambiguation)
- Dick Vaughn, musician
