= David Vaughan =

David Vaughan may refer to:

- David Vaughan (HBC captain) (died c. 1720), Hudson's Bay Company captain
- David Vaughan (architect) (c. 1810–c. 1892), Welsh architect, surveyor, land agent and diarist
- David Vaughan (Wisconsin politician) (1822–1890), American farmer and politician
- David Vaughan (British politician) (1873–1938), British Member of Parliament for Forest of Dean 1929–1931
- David Vaughan (dance archivist) (1924–2017), American archivist for the Merce Cunningham Dance Company, dance writer, critic and scholar
- David Vaughan (artist) (1944–2003), British psychedelic artist
- David Vaughan (golfer) (born 1948), Welsh professional golfer
- David Vaughan (footballer) (born 1983), Welsh footballer who plays for Nantwich Town
- David Vaughan (glaciologist) (1962–2023), climate scientist at the British Antarctic Survey
- David Vaughan Icke (born 1952), English conspiracy theorist
- David Vaughan (South Carolina politician) (born 1965), member of the South Carolina House of Representatives

== See also ==
- David Vaughn (disambiguation)
