= Vaughan-Lee =

Vaughan-Lee is a surname. Notable people with the surname include:

- Charles Vaughan-Lee (1867–1928), British navy admiral
- Emmanuel Vaughan-Lee (born 1979), British filmmaker
- Llewellyn Vaughan-Lee (born 1953), British mystic
- Michael Vaughan-Lee, British mathematician
- Patrick Vaughan Lee (1931–2010), Canadian bishop
- Vaughan Vaughan-Lee (1836–1882), British politician

== See also ==
- Vaughan (surname)
- Lee (English surname)
- Vaughan Lee (fighter), English mixed martial artist
