= William Lloyd (bishop of Killala and Achonry) =

William Lloyd was an Irish Anglican priest in the last quarter of the seventeenth century and the first quarter of the eighteenth.

He was Dean of Achonry from 1683 to 1691 and Bishop of Killala and Achonry from then until his death on 11 December 1716.

Church of Ireland titles
Preceded by James Vaughan	Dean of Achonry; 1683–1691	Succeeded by Samuel Foley
Preceded by Richard Tennison	Bishop of Killala and Achonry; 1691–1716	Succeeded by Henry Downes
