= James Vaughn =

James Vaughn may refer to:

- James T. Vaughn (1925–2007), American politician and law enforcement officer
- James T. Vaughn Jr. (born 1949), American lawyer and judge
- Joseph Paul Franklin (1950–2013), American neo-Nazi and serial killer, born James Vaughn
- Hippo Vaughn (1888–1966), American baseball player, born James Leslie Vaughn

== See also ==
- James Vaughan (disambiguation)
- James T. Vaughn Correctional Center, state prison in Delaware
