= Tom Vaughn =

Tom Vaughn may refer to:

- Tom Vaughn (musician) (1937–2011), American jazz pianist and Episcopalian priest
- Tom Vaughn (American football) (1943–2020), former professional American football safety

== See also ==
- Thomas Vaughan (disambiguation)
- Tom Vaughan (disambiguation)
