= Eliza Vaughan =

Welsh Catholic mother and convert

Louisa Elizabeth Vaughan
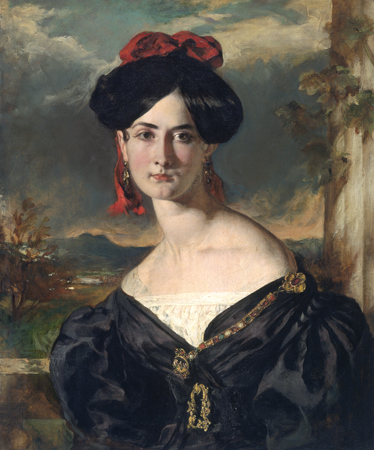
- Painting by William Etty (c. 1835)
- Born: 8 October 1810; London, England
- Died: 24 January 1853 (aged 42); Courtfield, Welsh Bicknor, Herefordshire, England
- Spouse: John Francis Vaughan (m. 1830)
- Children: Herbert, Roger, Bernard, John and 11 others
- Parent(s): John Rolls; Martha Barnet Rolls

Louisa Elizabeth Vaughan (8 October 1810, London – 24 January 1853, Welsh Bicknor), commonly known as Eliza, was a Welsh Catholic convert and mother of influential Catholic figures in England and Australia. She is under consideration for beatification in the Catholic Church.

== Biography ==
=== Early life ===
Eliza was born on 8 October 1810 in London to John Rolls, a member of the renowned Rolls family of The Hendre and Justice of the Peace for Monmouthshire; and Martha Barnet, only daughter and heiress of Jacob Barnet, a businessman. She was the youngest of five with two brothers, John E. W. and Alexander, and two sisters, Martha Sarah and Jessy. Her grandnephew, Charles Stewart Rolls, a motoring and aviation pioneer co-founded the Rolls-Royce car manufacturing firm.

Described as a family of "earnest evangelicals", Eliza and her siblings were baptized in the Anglican Protestant tradition, the faith her family ancestry upheld. Despite her Protestant upbringing, she was deeply impressed by the exemplary service of the Catholic Church towards the poor and heard of many Catholic saints during her childhood education in France.

=== Marriage and Conversion ===
On 12 July 1830, Eliza married John Francis Vaughan, eldest son of William Vaughan of Courtfield. She converted to Catholicism, despite the objection of her relatives, on 31 October 1830 as a result of the Vaughan's devotion to the Christian faith and John Francis being a member of the Sodality of Our Lady. She eventually received the Sacrament of Confirmation twelve years later from Bishop John Brown. They would later have thirteen children, one dying after birth, four of five daughters becoming nuns and six of her eight sons became priests, including a bishop, an archbishop and a cardinal:

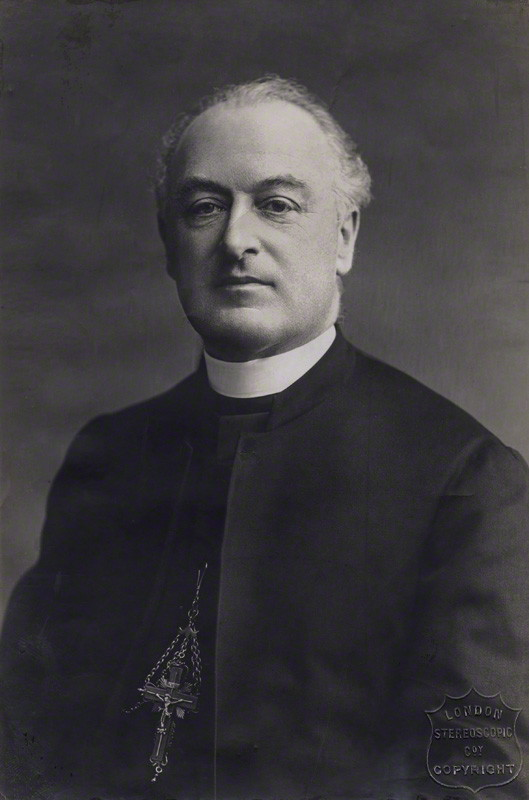
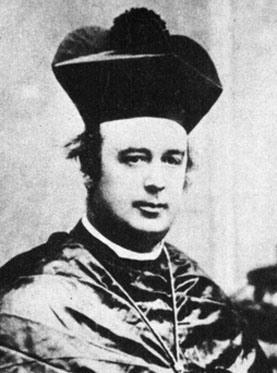
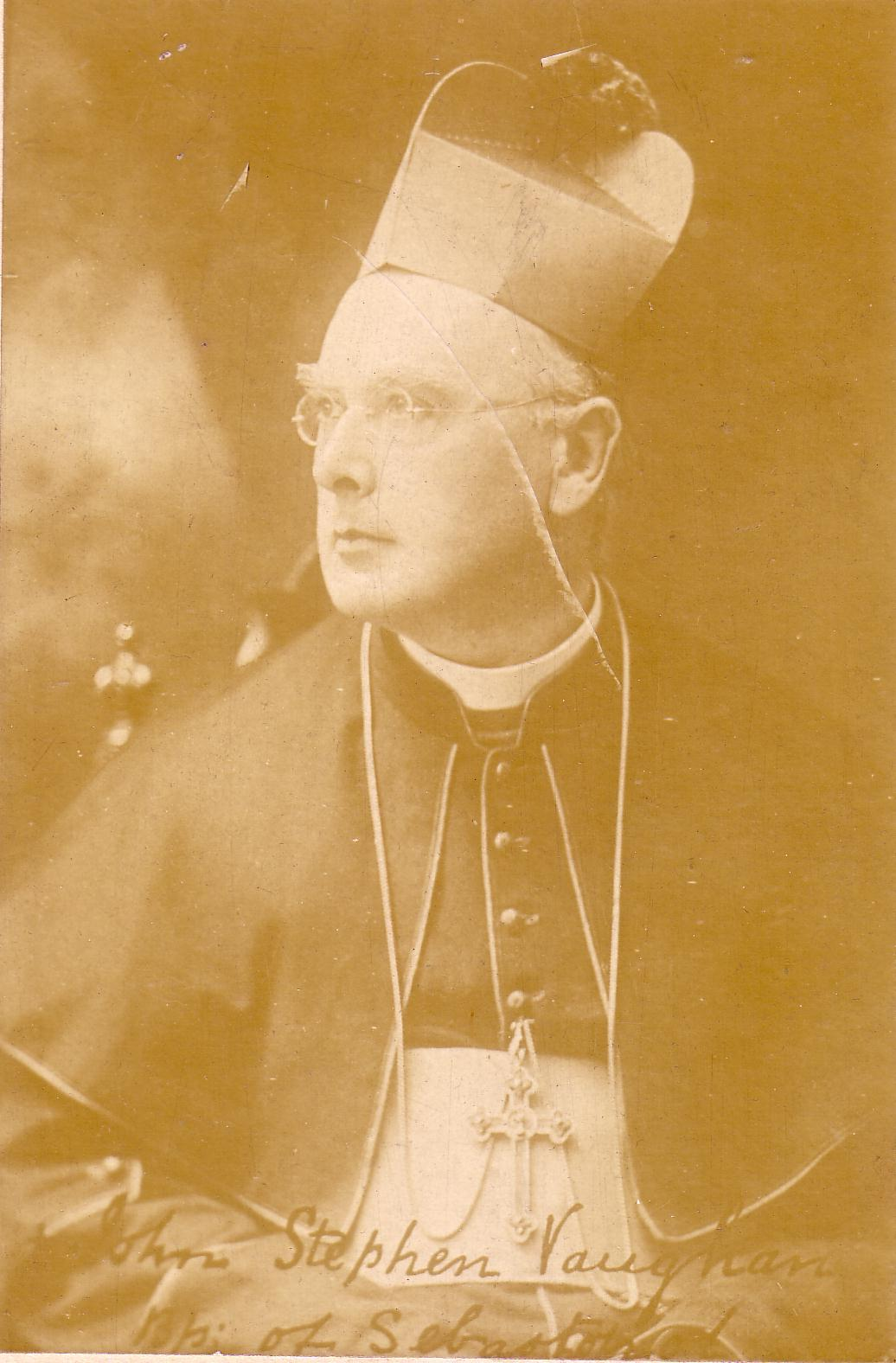
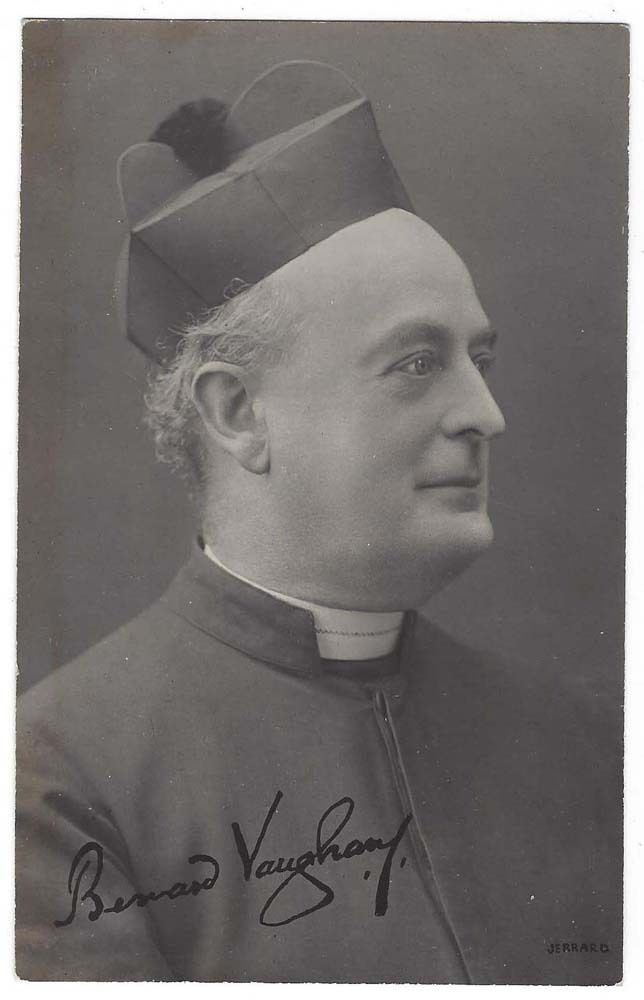
Clockwise from top left: Herbert, Roger, Bernard and John, four of the six sons of Eliza that entered priesthood.
1. Herbert Alfred (1832–1903), Cardinal Archbishop of Westminster and founder of the Mill Hill Missionaries;
2. Roger William, O.S.B. (1834–1883), Archbishop of Sydney, Australia;
3. Kenelm John (d. 1837), died less than a year;
4. Gwladys Teresa, V.S.M. (1838–1880) as Sœur Elizabeth Filomena, Visitation nun in Boulogne, France;
5. Helen Teresa, D.C. (1839–1861) as Sister Mary, member of the Daughters of Charity of Saint Vincent de Paul in London;
6. Kenelm David Francis (1840–1909), diocesan missionary priest in Spain and North America;
7. Jerome Joseph, O.S.B. (1841–1896), founding prior of St. Benedict's Abbey at Fort Augustus, Scotland;
8. Clare Mary, P.C.C. (1843–1862) as Sœur Marie-Clare de l'Enfant Jésus, Collettine Poor Clare nun in Amiens, France;
9. Francis William (1844–1919), inherited the family estate and married Caroline Ruth Pope, daughter of Charles Alexander Pope, one of America's most distinguished surgeons;
10. Mary Elizabeth Barbara, O.S.A. (1845–1884) as Mother Clare Magdalen, Augustinian nun of Saint Augustine's Priory, Newton Abbot, Devon;
11. Bernard John, S.J. (1847–1922), Jesuit priest and missionary described as "The Modern Savonarola";
12. Reginald Aloysius (1849–1919), married Judith Aloysia Shanahan, an Irish Catholic in Australia; and
13. Margaret Mary (1850–1899), desired to be a nun but ill health prevented her hence lived at home and in her final years in a convent;
14. John Stephen (1853–1925), Auxiliary Bishop of Salford.

=== "Mother of Vocations" ===
Eliza developed a great passion for Catholic devotions. Throughout her life, she made it a habit of spending an hour a day in prayer, between 5 and 6 p.m., before the Blessed Sacrament inside their family chapel in Courtfield. There she prayed fervently that God may give her a large family and that many of her children would enter religious life.

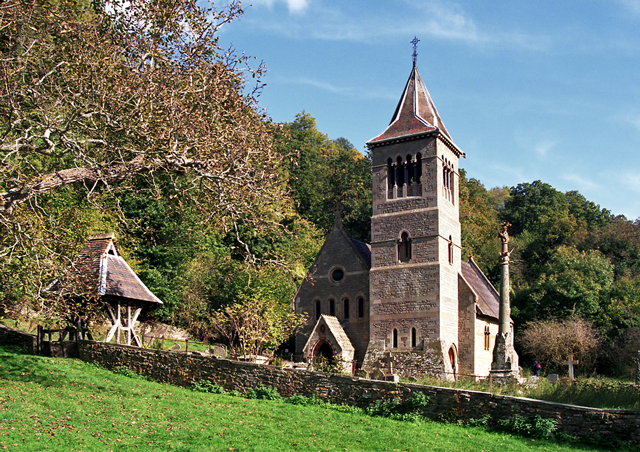
St Margaret's Parish Church in Welsh Bicknor, one of the places where Eliza spends time in prayer.

Eliza taught her children to combine spiritual and religious duties with fun and joy in a way that was very natural to them. Because of her, devotions and daily Masses in the family chapel were just as much as part of her children's everyday life as playing, riding horses, amateur theater, and music. Her charitable works of visiting the sick and helping the needy encouraged as well her children to be generous and make sacrifices such as giving away their toys or savings. She often told them the lives of the saints.

She began her steadfast prayer for vocations after reading about St. Stephen Harding, one of the founders of the Cistercian Order, in The Lives of the Saints written by John Henry Newman, and found great inspiration, saying:

"Ever since I read the account of St. Bernard and his four brothers leaving the world and retiring to a monastery I have prayed that all my sons will follow their example."

At some point, Eliza started praying to the mothers of saints, asking their intercessions that some of her children would be called to serve God and the Church. Her prayers were eventually answered having six priests: two priests in religious orders, one diocesan priest, one bishop, one archbishop and one cardinal; and four nuns in religious orders in the family.

=== Death ===
Eliza died on 24 January 1853, at the age of 42, shortly after giving birth to her 14th child. She was interred in the Courtfield House Chapelyard.

In a letter, John Francis expressed his belief that divine providence brought Eliza to him, saying:

"I thanked the Lord in adoration today that I could give back to him my dearly beloved wife. I poured out my heart to him, full of thankfulness that, as an example and a guide, he gave me Eliza with whom I am still now bound by an inseparable, spiritual bond. What wonderful consolation and grace she brought me! I still see her as I always saw her before the Blessed Sacrament: her inner purity and extraordinary human kindness which her beautiful face reflected during prayer."

== Beatification ==
Since 2023, the Roman Catholic Archdiocese of Cardiff has initiated investigations into the possible sainthood for Louisa Elizabeth Vaughan. The Integrated Parish Communications describes her as "a particularly encouraging example of a mother imbued with a priestly spirit who frequently prayed for vocations."
