= James Vaughan (priest) =

17th-century Dean of Achonry

James Vaughan was Dean of Achonry from 1662 to 1683.

Church of Ireland titles
Preceded by Rodolph Hollingwood	Dean of Achonry; 1662–1683	Succeeded by William Lloyd
