= David Vaughan (architect) =

David Montgomery Vaughan (c. 1810 – c. 1892) was a Welsh architect, surveyor, land agent and diarist.

Vaughan began his career working as a carpenter at Stradey Castle in Llanelli. He began practising as an architect around 1840, and became land agent for major estates in South Wales including: Ffynnonwen, Newton, Llanharry, St Fagans, Cottrell and Pendoylan.

Vaughan is best known as the architect of Bridgend Town Hall, erected in 1843 and demolished in 1971. The building was in a Greek Doric style and made the town of Bridgend the owner of one of the most impressive civic buildings in Wales. An earlier project was Bonvilston House, together with its lodge (which still stands) and estate buildings for John Bassett. and also Fairwater House in Cardiff. This was followed by the major alteration and additions to Cottrell Park for Sir George Tyler. He also worked on Miskin Manor; Penlline Castle; Velindre, Newcastle Emlyn; and Hardwick House, Chepstow. He rebuilt the Church of St Illtyd in Llanharry in the years 1867–8. and built or undertook works on other churches at Bridgend, Llandow, Llantwit-juxta-Neath, Merthyr Tydfil, Michaelston-super-Ely, St Georges-Super-Ely, St Hilary, St Nicholas, St John the Evangelist's Church, Clifton, and St Luke Old Street. Other works include the Glamorgan and Monmouthshire Infirmary, Cardiff Science and Art Schools, Swansea Town Hall, as well as schools at: Bettws, Bridgend, Trinity Street - Cardiff, Llandow, Llansannor, Ystradowen and Newton Nottage. He designed vicarages and rectories including: St Mellons, Llandow, Llanilid, Llantrithiyd, Pentyrch and Grosmont.

Vaughan was married to Harriet Rees of Welsh St Donats, who gave him ten children; following her death he married Ann Day, by whom he had another twelve. In the mid-1880s, Vaughan and most of his large family moved from Bonvilston to Llwynglas, near Peterston-super-Ely in the Vale of Glamorgan. Most of his papers and drawings are in the "Peter Verity Collection" at the Glamorgan Archives.

His date of death is recorded by some sources as 1892, but his assets were not audited until September 1905, thus his actual date of death is uncertain.
