= Peter Vaughan (disambiguation) =

Peter Vaughan (1923–2016) was a British character actor.

Peter Vaughan may also refer to:

- Peter Vaughan (bishop) (1930–2020), Bishop of Ramsbury in the Church of England
- Peter Vaughan-Clarke (1957–2023), British actor
- Peter Rolfe Vaughan (1935–2008), British academic
- Peter Vaughan (priest) (1770–1825), Dean of Chester, 1820–1826
- Peter Vaughan (police officer) (born 1962), Chief Constable of South Wales Police
