= Tom Vaughan =

Tom Vaughan may refer to:

- Tom Vaughan (actor) (born 1985), English actor
- Tom Vaughan (director) (born 1969), Scottish television and film director

== See also ==
- Thomas Vaughan (disambiguation)
- Tom Vaughn (disambiguation)
