= Richard Vaughan (cricketer) =

English cricketer

Personal information
- Full name: Richard Thomas Vaughan
- Born: 28 May 1908; Mazatlán, Sinaloa, Mexico
- Died: 1 April 1966 (aged 57); Woodborough, Wiltshire, England
- Batting: Right-handed
- Role: Wicket-keeper

Domestic team information
- Years: Team
- 1928: Cambridge University
- 1928–1930: Berkshire
- 1937–1951: Wiltshire

Career statistics
Competition	First-class
Matches	2
Runs scored	16
Batting average	5.33
100s/50s	0/0
Top score	13
Catches/stumpings	1/–
- Source: Cricinfo, 5 June 2011

Richard Thomas Vaughan (28 May 1908 – 1 April 1966) was an English cricketer who played for Berkshire and Wiltshire, as a right-handed batsman who fielded as a wicket-keeper. In later life he was a farmer and magistrate.

The son of Thomas Hallowes Vaughan and Elsie Vaughan, he was born in Mazatlán, Sinaloa, Mexico. He was educated at Repton School, where his house and headmaster was the future Archbishop of Canterbury Geoffrey Fisher.

Vaughan proceeded to Clare College, Cambridge, where he gained a Blue in football for three consecutive years. He captained the university football team during this time. He made his first-class debut for Cambridge University against Leicestershire in 1928. In this match, he was dismissed for 3 runs in the Cambridge first innings by Ewart Astill; he was not required to bat in their second innings. He played a second and final first-class match for the university in the same season, against Sussex, where he was dismissed for a duck by Arthur Gilligan in the university first innings. In their second innings, he scored 13 runs before being dismissed by Maurice Tate.

He made his debut for Berkshire in the 1928 Minor Counties Championship against Wiltshire. He appeared in three further matches for Berkshire in 1930, the last coming against Oxfordshire. He later joined Wiltshire in 1937, appearing again for the county in 1939 and after World War II, playing Minor Counties cricket for Wiltshire until 1951 and making 16 appearances.

Outside cricket, Vaughan worked for Shell in Ceylon during the early 1930s. Returning from there, he took up farming in 1935, buying Middle Farm in Winterbourne Monkton, Wiltshire. He married Blanche Innes Dickson in 1937, and they had three daughters. Their eldest daughter Sarah, a civil servant at the Ministry of Defence, was appointed OBE in the 1998 New Year Honours.

He served in World War II with the Royal Army Service Corps, obtaining the rank of 2nd Lieutenant in 1940. He was later promoted to a full Lieutenant and in March 1941 to a Temporary Captain. The Service Corp was later attached to the 18th Infantry Division, arriving in Singapore three weeks before the Japanese invasion, which ended in a British surrender. He spent time following the surrender as a prisoner of war in Changi Prison, before being sent to work on the Burma Railway, working there for eight months. During his internment he came across his brother-in-law John Austin Dickson, and they helped each other through their captivity. His experiences during the war were rarely mentioned by him in later life.

Following the war, he resumed farming in Wiltshire. He also served as a J.P., and as chairman of the local branches of the National Farmers Union and Conservative Party. He gave up farming in 1963 following a series of heart attacks, later dying in Woodborough, Wiltshire on 1 April 1966. His wife died 41 years later in 2007.
