= Harry Vaughan =

Harry Vaughan may refer to:

- Harry Vaughan (American football) (1883–1951), head coach of the Ohio State Buckeyes American football team
- Harry H. Vaughan (1893–1981), general and White House military aide during the Truman administration
- W. Harry Vaughan (1900–?), founder of the Georgia Tech Research Institute
- Harry Vaughan (footballer), English footballer

== See also ==
- Henry Vaughan (disambiguation)
- Harry Vaughan Watkins (10–1945), Welsh rugby union player
