= James J. Vaughan =

American composer

James J. Vaughan, also known as James Vaughn (1870–1935), was an American composer, musical director, and bandleader. He wrote music for several musicals. He was among the first African-American musicians to play at Carnegie Hall in 1912.

Vaughan wrote songs for several Will Marion Cook musical productions. He and James Reese Europe organized the Clef Club, a union for African-American musicians. It was integrated with the American Federation of Musicians in 1914.

He worked for Bert Williams and George Walker. He conducted the orchestra and performed piano accompaniment on tour in In Dahomey, for which he was also credited with musical direction and recognized in The Black Manhattan Trilogy – Three Volume Set.
