= Thomas Vaughan (footballer) =

Welsh footballer

Personal information
- Date of birth: 1864
- Place of birth: Wales

International career
Years	Team	Apps	(Gls)
1885	Wales	1	(0)

Thomas Vaughan (born 1864) was a Welsh international footballer. He was part of the Wales national football team, playing 1 match on 14 March 1885 against England.

== See also ==
- List of Wales international footballers (alphabetical)
