= William Partridge (soldier) =

William Partridge was born in Ross-on-Wye, Herefordshire on 27 June 1858. William moved to Blaina, Monmouthshire when he was a young boy with his parents. He enlisted into the 24th Regiment of Foot at Newport on 7 June 1877 having previously served in the Royal Monmouthshire Militia.

== From Blaina to South Africa ==
William was one of a draft that joined the 2/24th in South Africa in July 1878. In January 1879, he was one of the small garrison at Rorke's Drift which held out from over 12 hours when the mission station was attacked by a Zulu force of 4,500 warriors. Following the end of the Zulu war, William remained with the 2nd Battalion when it moved to Gibraltar, but was soon back in Great Britain.

== Marriage ==
Whilst at the Regimental Depot in Brecon, William met, and in November 1880 married, local girl Mary Reeves. Mary was the sister to Sarah Reeves who in 1876 had married Corporal William Wilson Allen – Corporal Allen was awarded a Victoria Cross for his actions at Rorke's Drift.

== Service and later life ==
William Partridge was medically discharged with a pension from the army in November 1881. On 16 April 1930, he died at Blaina, aged 71 years.

== Memorial ==
William Partridge was buried at Blaina Cemetery in sunken ground, the plot is marked by a simple wooden cross, which was made by his great-grandson on discovering his resting place 10 years ago. On 21 September 2008 the grave was rededicated with a headstone which donated by Co-Operative Funeral Care.

A service at St. Peter's Parish Church, Blaina, was followed by a march to Blaina cemetery, the parade was led by the Regimental band of the Royal Welsh with Royal British Legion standard bearers, 1879 Group Living History Company, and members of the Partridge Family in attendance. At an emotional graveside ceremony Beaufort Choir, accompanied by the band of the Royal Welsh, sang Men of Harlech. The Last Post and a gunfire salute from Martini-Henry rifles, the same type as those used at Rorke’s Drift, concluded the ceremonies.

The services were organised by the Royal Welsh Regiment, Blaina Royal British Legion and Blaina Communities First. Present was his last surviving direct descendant grandson William Arthur Coles (Second World War veteran) and great-great-grandson Khi Burgess.
