= Henry Vaughan (disambiguation) =

Henry Vaughan (1621–1695) was a Welsh physician and metaphysical poet.

Henry Vaughan may also refer to:

- Henry Vaughan (MP for Bristol), in 1486, MP for Bristol (UK Parliament constituency)
- Henry Vaughan (fl.1597), MP for Carmarthen Boroughs (UK Parliament constituency)
- Sir Henry Vaughan (Welsh politician, born by 1586) (by 1586–1660/61), Welsh Member of Parliament and Royalist military leader during the English Civil War
- Henry Vaughn (baseball) (1864–1914), baseball player
- Sir Henry Vaughan (Welsh politician, born 1613) (1613–1676), Member of Parliament for Carmarthenshire, 1668–1679, and Royalist during the English Civil War
- Sir Henry Halford Vaughan (1811–1885), historian
- Henry Vaughan (art collector) (1809-1899)
- Henry Vaughan (architect) (1845–1917), mainly designed churches
- Henry F. Vaughan, Dean of the University of Michigan School of Public Health, 1941–1959
- Henry Earle Vaughan (1912–1978), American telephony engineer
- Henry Vaughan (American football)

== See also ==
- Harry Vaughan (disambiguation)
