= Michael Vaughn =

Michael Vaughn may refer to:

- Michael G. Vaughn, American social work professor
- Michael L. Vaughn (born 1957), Maryland politician
- Michael Vaughn (Alias), a character from Alias

== See also ==
- Michael Vaughan (born 1974), English cricket commentator and former cricketer
- Mike Vaughan (born 1954), American football player
