= Courtfield, Welsh Bicknor =

Grade II listed structure in Herefordshire, United Kingdom

Courtfield
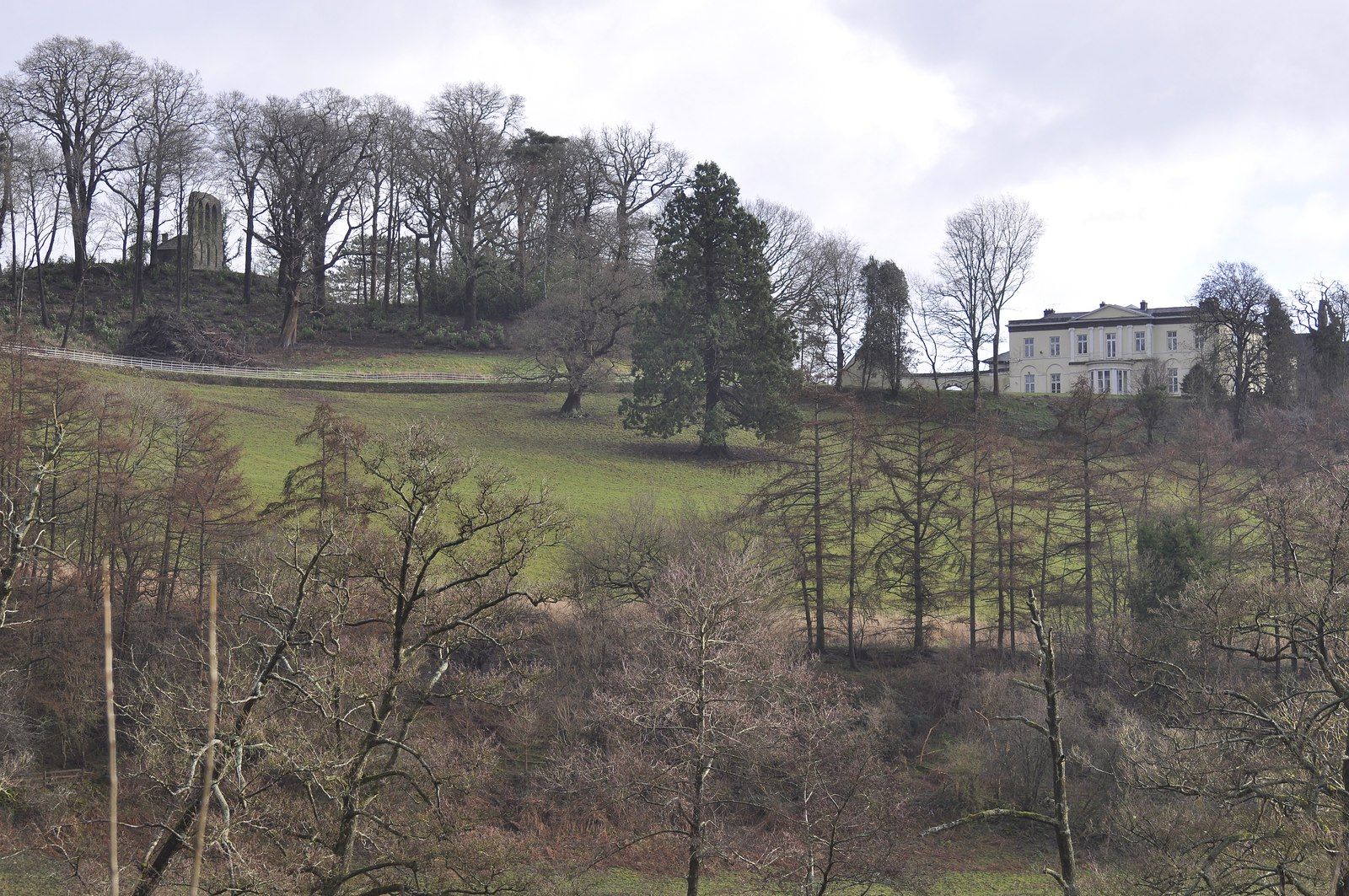
- The house from Stowfield Road

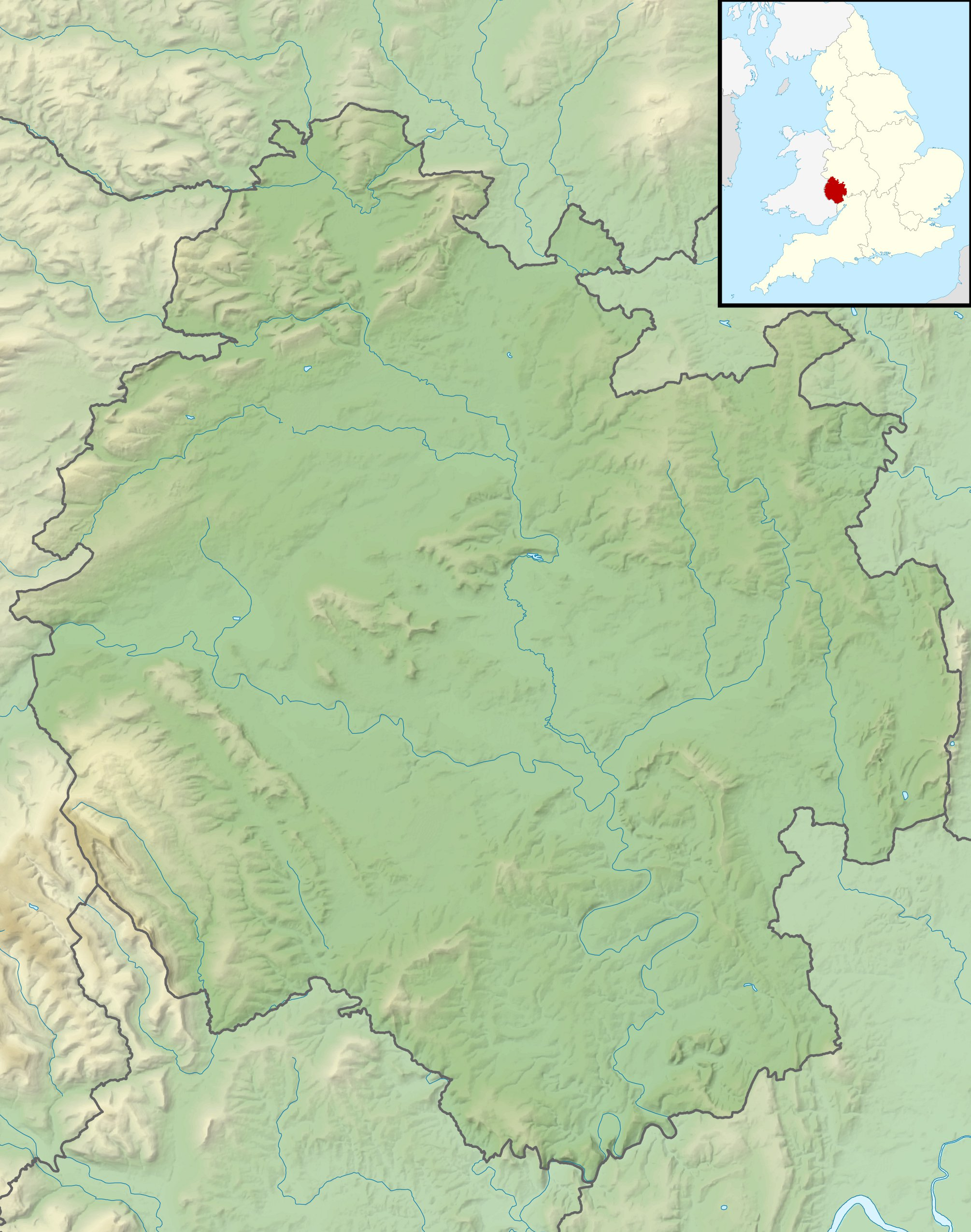
- Location within Herefordshire
- 51.8544°N 2.5859°W
- Type: House
- Location: Welsh Bicknor, Herefordshire

History
- Built: 19th century

Site notes
- Architect: William Miles
- Architectural style: Regency
- Owner: Privately owned

Listed Building – Grade II
- Official name: Courtfield and adjoining quadrant wall with coachway entrance
- Designated: 18 May 1969
- Reference no.: 1179390

Listed Building – Grade II
- Official name: Chapel of St Mary
- Designated: 3 July 1985
- Reference no.: 1348964

Listed Building – Grade II
- Official name: The Hermitage
- Designated: 3 July 1985
- Reference no.: 1099390

Listed Building – Grade II
- Official name: Glenwye
- Designated: 3 July 1985
- Reference no.: 1179411

Courtfield, Welsh Bicknor, Herefordshire, England is a country house dating from the early 19th century. The present building stands on the site of a much older mansion which, according to tradition, was home to Henry V for the early years of his life. This house was originally called Greenfield or Greyfield but was renamed Courtfield at that time. Nothing now remains of that building and the present house was erected in the very early 19th century by William Michael Vaughan. The Vaughans had purchased the estate in the 16th century. Staunchly Roman Catholic, and much persecuted in the 17th and 18th centuries; in the mid-19th century Herbert Vaughan, later a cardinal and Archbishop of Westminster, was brought up at the house, born into a large family, an unusually high number of whom entered the church. In 1950 Courtfield was sold by Patrick Vaughan to the Mill Hill Missionaries who ran a House of Formation at the house. In 2010, the mission was closed and the house sold back to the Vaughan family, who had retained ownership of the wider estate. Courtfield is a Grade II listed building. The house is not open to the public.

== History ==
The medieval manor of Grayfield, or Greenfield, was a possession of the Montagu(e) family. According to tradition, the young Henry V, born at Monmouth Castle in 1386, was raised at Courtfield between 1387 and 1394. (Note: Records vary as to whether Henry was raised by Margaret, wife of John Montagu, 1st Baron Montagu or by her daughter-in-law, Maud, wife of John Montagu, 3rd Earl of Salisbury.) The cradle of Henry V was long thought to have come from Courtfield, although modern furniture historians consider that the crib, now in the Royal Collection, post-dates his birth by at least a century. In the 16th century, the estate was bought by the Vaughans, a cadet branch of the Herbert family. (Note: At this time Welsh Bicknor was in Monmouthshire, passing to Herefordshire under the Counties (Detached Parts) Act 1844.) The Vaughans were, and remain, Roman Catholic and suffered considerable persecution in the 17th and 18th centuries.

In his The Excursion down the Wye, published in 1808, the Monmouth antiquarian Charles Heath writes that William Vaughan pulled down the original house and “erected a very handsome mansion, compatible with the comforts of modern life.” Heath states that the architect for the building was Mr Maddox of Monmouth, although modern sources disagree (see Architecture and description). (Note: Charles Heath does not specify whether “Mr Maddox” was George Maddox, George Vaughan Maddox, or another member of the family, many of whom were builders and architects.) In the later 19th century John Francis Vaughan married Louisa Elizabeth (Eliza) Rolls of the Rolls family of The Hendre, Monmouthshire. (Note: A portrait of Eliza by William Etty is held at the National Museum Wales.) A convert to Catholicism, Eliza became extremely devout, and five of her six daughters became nuns while, of her eight sons who survived childhood, six became priests, including three bishops. The most notable was Herbert Vaughan, Archbishop of Westminster. Vaughan founded the Mill Hill Missionaries and the Catholic Truth Society, bought the Catholic newspaper, The Tablet to increase the influence of the church, and oversaw the early construction of Westminster Cathedral. (Note: Another son, Bernard (1847-1922), became a famous preacher. A collection of his sermons, titled The Sins of Society in which he castigated the Smart Set, saw him dubbed “The Modern Savonarola”.)

In 1950 the Vaughans sold the house to the Mill Hill Missionaries, while retaining possession of the wider estate. The missionaries remained at the house until 2010, when it was sold back to the Vaughan family. The house is again a private residence and is not open to the public.

== Architecture and description ==
The house is approached along a drive though a former deer park. The building is of seven bays and two storeys, the construction material being stuccoed stone. The style is Regency, executed in a not particularly adept way. Alan Brooks, in his 2012 revised Herefordshire Pevsner Buildings of England, notes the "unconvincing" arrangement of pilasters and pediment. Both Pevsner and Historic England attribute the design to William Miles, a surveyor from Stroud. Brooks further notes the Soanean influences in the interior of the house including vaulted ceilings, domed skylights and curved bay windows. A curved wall to the left of the house is pierced by an archway into the stable yard. This is now mostly filled with extensions dating from the 1960s, put up by the Mission fathers.

Courtfield is a Grade II listed building. The chapel built by the Vaughans in the 1880s, and subsequently used by the Mission, a hermitage in the grounds, and a dower house, Glenwye, also have Grade II listings.

== Sources ==
- Brooks, Alan; Pevsner, Nikolaus (2012). Herefordshire. The Buildings of England. Yale University Press. ISBN 978-0-300-12575-7.
- Oldnall, Nick (2012). Courtfield (PDF). Forest of Dean Local History Society.
