= Roger Vaughan (bishop) =

Archbishop of Sydney from 1877 to 1883

The Most Reverend Roger Vaughan O.S.B.
- Archbishop of Sydney
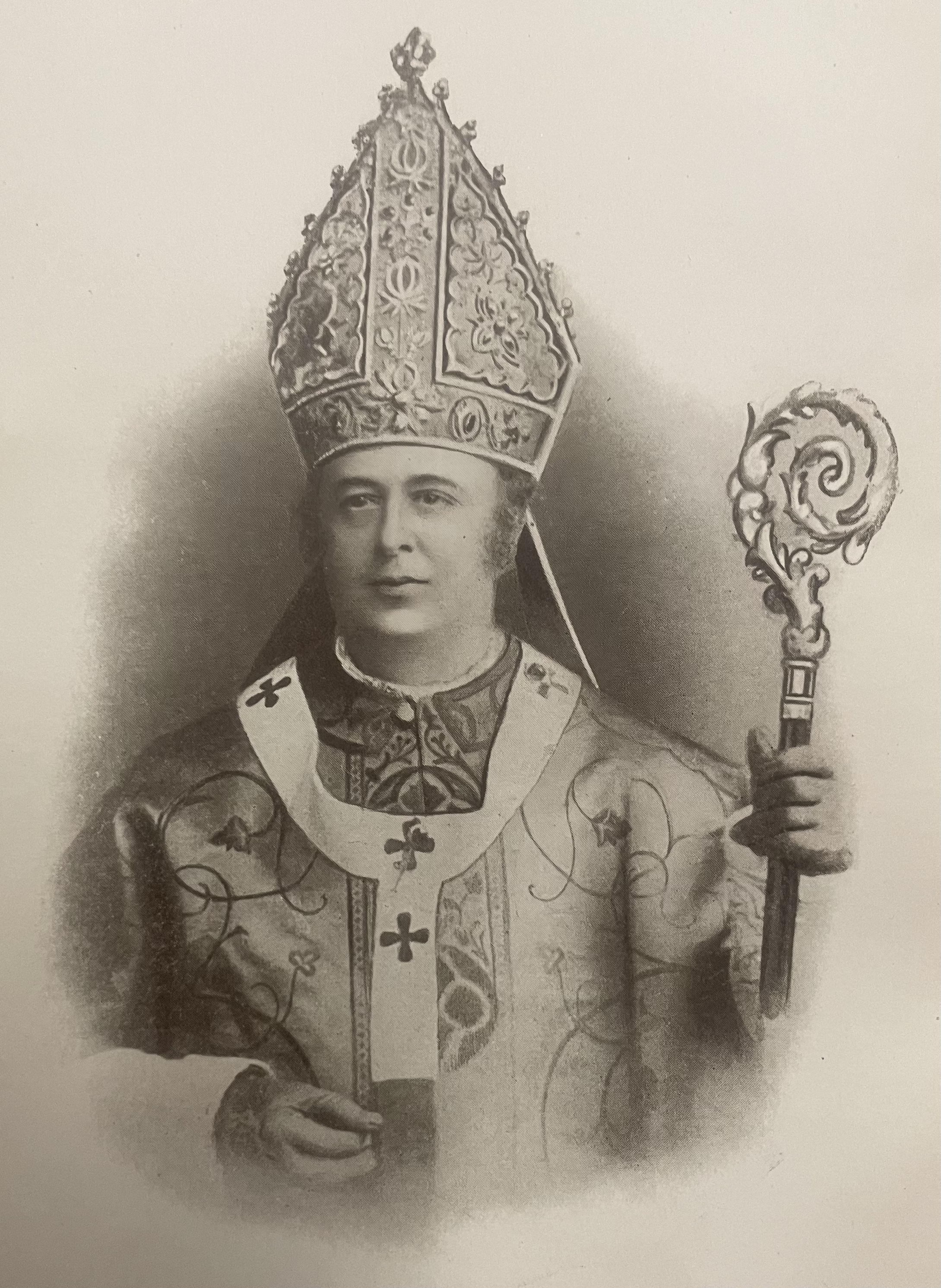
- Church: Catholic
- Archdiocese: Sydney
- Appointed: 5 February 1873

Orders
- Ordination: 9 April 1859 by Costantino Patrizi Naro
- Consecration: 19 March 1873 by Henry Edward Manning

Personal details
- Born: Roger William Vaughan; 9 January 1834 Herefordshire, England
- Died: 18 August 1883 (aged 49) Liverpool, England
- Buried: St Mary's Cathedral, Sydney
- Denomination: Catholic
- Parents: John Francis Vaughan; Elizabeth Louise Rolls

Roger William Bede Vaughan O.S.B. (9 January 1834 – 18 August 1883) was an English Benedictine monk of Downside Abbey and the second Roman Catholic Archbishop of Sydney, Australia, from 1877 to 1883.

== Life and career ==
=== Early life ===
Vaughan was born near Ross-on-Wye, Herefordshire, in 1834, one of 14 children. His father, lieutenant John Francis Vaughan, belonged to one of the oldest recusant families of Welsh descent in England. His mother was Louisa Elizabeth Rolls, a convert to Roman Catholicism. His brother was Cardinal Herbert Vaughan. Most of his siblings entered church ministry.

Vaughan was probably afflicted with congenital heart disease. At age seven he was sent briefly to a local school, but his mother worried over his health and he was educated at home in a religious atmosphere. In September 1851 he was sent to the Benedictine order's St Gregory's College at Downside, Somerset. His mother's death in 1853 prompted serious thoughts of a religious vocation and on 12 September 1853 he took the Benedictine habit and the religious name "Bede".

In 1855, at his father's request and expense, Vaughan was sent to Rome for further study under the guidance of the Italian scholar and reformer Angelo Zelli-Jacobuzzi. When the future Edward VII visited Rome, the young monk served as his cicerone. He remained there for four years, living at the monastery of St. Paul Outside the Walls. He was ordained to the priesthood by Cardinal Patrizi at the basilica of St John Lateran on 9 April 1859.

=== Priesthood ===
In 1865 he met Archbishop John Bede Polding, who several times asked Vaughan to be coadjutor bishop, and in 5 February 1873, Vaughan agreed and was appointed coadjutor of Sydney and titular bishop of Nazianzus. Cardinal Henry Manning consecrated Vaughan to the episcopate in March that year in Liverpool.

=== Coadjutor Bishop of Sydney ===
From 1874 onward, Vaughan also served as rector of St John's College.

In 1876, he came into conflict with the Freemasons in connection with an address delivered on 9 October titled "Hidden Springs" which accused the Freemasons of a conspiracy to subvert religion and take over the education system.

=== Archbishop of Sydney ===
Vaughan urged Catholics to work against a 1880 education law passed by Henry Parkes.

He initiated moves towards the foundation of St Patrick's Seminary, Manly, construction of which started soon after his death.

Vaughan experienced resistance from the largely Irish Catholic junior hierarchy and priesthood in Australia, who supported a church based on the devotional, penitential and authoritarian model envisioned by Irish cardinal Paul Cullen. Despite the stated policies of the Catholic Emancipation Act 1829, the largely Irish-formed Maynooth Seminary clergy were educated to think of the refined English Catholic bishops in sectarian and atavistic terms. They also felt strongly that the form of church advocated by the Benedictines was less suited to the majority of Irish Catholic adherents than the Cullenist form.

The harsh 18th-century Penal Laws of the British and Anglo-Irish Ascendency era Irish parliaments and the on and off sectarian religious struggles since the Act of Supremacy 1559 had bred deep resentment between some of the Irish and English settlers. The consequences of the dissolution of the monasteries during the Reformation had left Vaughan deeply committed to the primary vision of restoring monasticism in English-speaking lands such as this new church in Australia.

This was not a vision the authors of the revived authoritarian devotional form of Catholicism in Ireland foresaw for the Irish Catholic diaspora in Australia, New Zealand or North America. Ireland had managed to preserve a number of pre-Reformation monastic foundations as well as found the Irish College in Rome. This was an ideological battle Vaughan fought through his episcopate, the outcome of which would not be largely determined until his successor Cardinal Patrick Francis Moran, a nephew of Paul Cullen and avid devotee of his vision, was appointed.

=== Death ===
Vaughan left Sydney for the last time on 19 April 1883, intending to return to Rome. He arrived at Liverpool and died nearby at Ince Blundell Hall, the seat of his Weld-Blundell relations, on 18 August, where he was buried in the family vault. His remains were translated to Belmont in 1887 and reburied in the crypt of St Mary's Cathedral in August 1946. Vaughan left the residue of his estate, valued for probate at £61,828, to his successor.

Catholic Church titles
Preceded by John Bede Polding OSB	2nd Catholic Archbishop of Sydney; 1877–1883	Succeeded by Patrick Francis Moran
