= British Goblins =

1880 nonfiction book

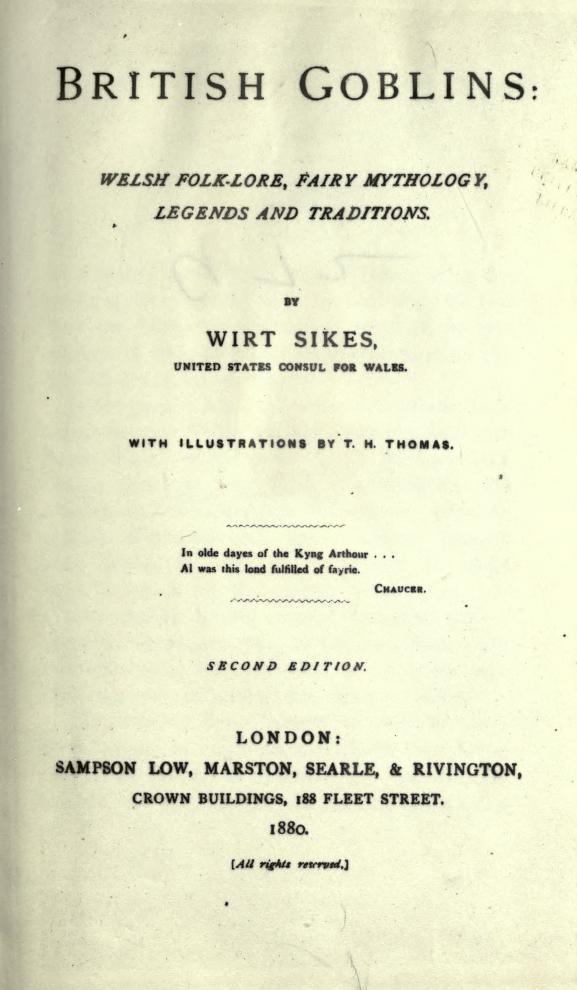
- Author: Wirt Sikes
- Illustrator: T. H. Thomas
- Publisher: Sampson Low (UK, 1880); James R. Osgood (US, 1881)
- Pages: 412
- OCLC: 4721171
- Text: British Goblins at Internet Archive

British Goblins: Welsh Folk-Lore, Fairy Mythology, Legends and Traditions is an 1880 book on Welsh folklore and mythology by American journalist Wirt Sikes.

== Background and publication ==
William Wirt Sikes was an American journalist and author who served as the United States Consul in Cardiff from 1876 until his death in 1883. In his early career, Sikes wrote various short-stories and poems for American magazines and newspapers, some of which were compiled into the Book for the Winter-Evening Fireside in 1858. He published two novels in the late 1860s, partially drawn from his experiences as a reporter for the Chicago Evening Journal.

Before taking his post as Consul, Sikes unsuccessfully searched for coverage of southern Wales in various bookstores, noting that he was only able to find an obsolete 18th century account of the region in the Library of Congress. Seeing American knowledge of Wales as insufficient, he published a number of articles on the country in American periodicals such as Harper's Magazine, Appletons' Journal, and Scribner's Monthly. These articles were later compiled into Rambles and Studies in Old South Wales, released in 1881. Frustrated by poor pay from Scribner's, Sikes began to compile folklore studies for British Goblins. It was illustrated by T. H. Thomas and published by London bookseller Sampson Low in 1880. The following year, an American edition was published by James R. Osgood in Boston; this edition featured no alterations beyond publication details, and included British spellings and punctuation.

== Synopsis ==
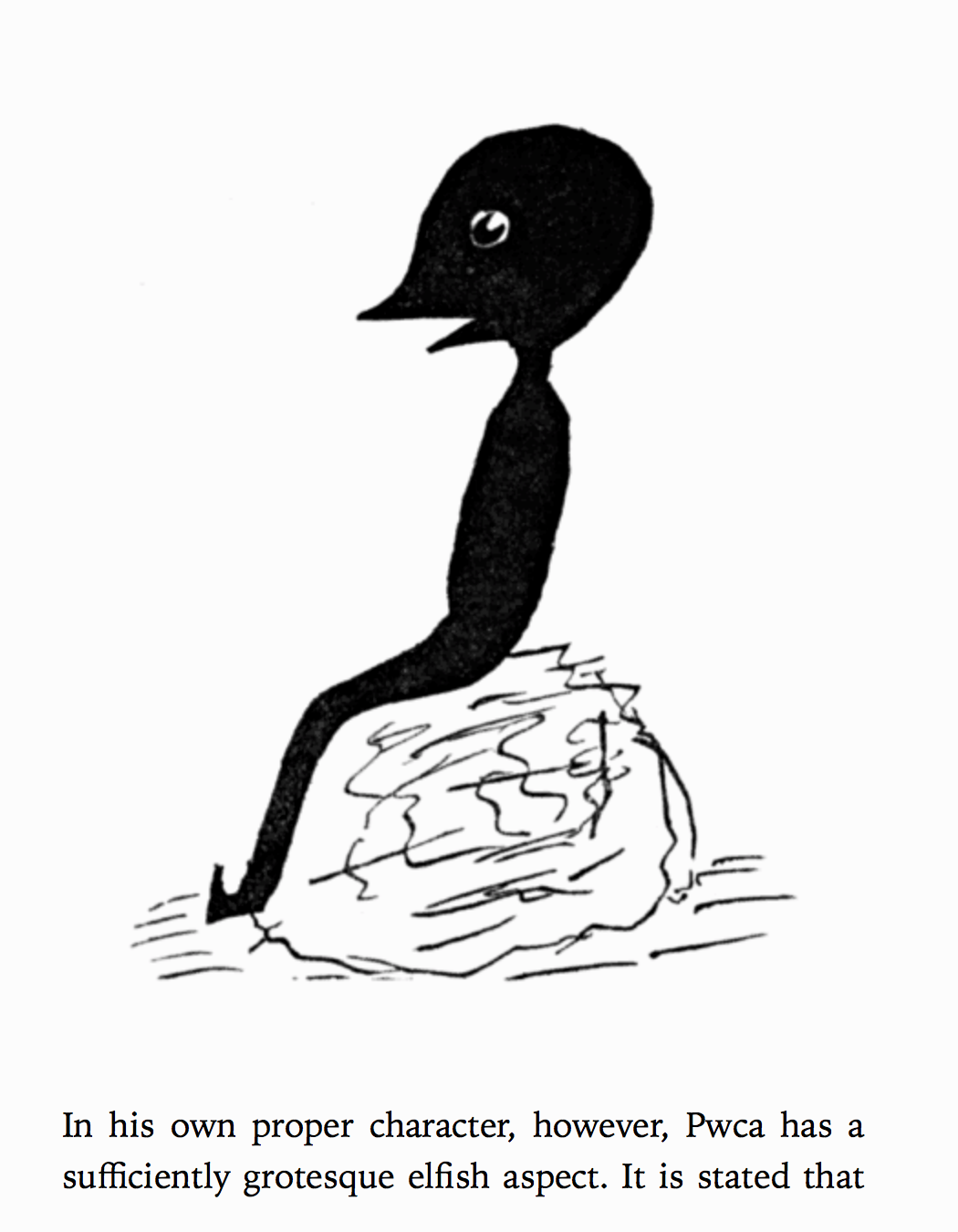
Sketch of Pwca depicted in British Goblins

British Goblins is divided into four sections; "The Realm of the Faerie", "The Spirit-World", "Quaint Old Customs", and "Bells, Wells, Stones and Dragons". Each section has a varying number of chapters, with a total of 32 chapters in the book.

=== Sourcing ===
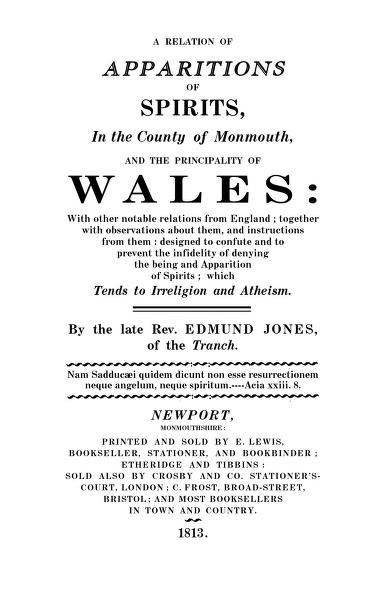
British Goblins borrows heavily from Edmund Jones's Apparitions of Spirits in the Principality of Wales

Sikes based British Goblins heavily on earlier collections of Welsh folklore. Edmund Jones's 1780 Apparitions of Spirits in the Principality of Wales was the most utilized source. Jones's writing is used throughout the book, and Sikes provides a brief biography of him; however, he notes that Jones's accounts differ markedly from other sources, and Sikes frequently makes footnotes and alterations to correct or reconcile Jones's accounts. British Goblins also borrows from Peter Roberts's 1815 Cambrian Popular Antiquities of Wales, the 1831 Cambrian Superstitions by W. Howell, and Charles Redwood's 1839 The Vale Of Glamorgan. Sikes also used medieval sources, such as the works of Gerald of Wales and Lady Charlotte Guest's translation of the Mabinogion.

Unlike many contemporary publications on Welsh folklore, portions of British Goblins were drawn from oral accounts and traditions collected in the field. Sikes noted one instance of gathering folk stories on fairies from men at an inn outside Cardiff.

== Reception ==
American folklorist Richard Dorson described British Goblins as the "most substantial book of Welsh legendry in English" in comparison to contemporaries such as John Rhŷs's 1901 Celtic Folk-Lore, Welsh and Manx; however, he criticized the book for its over-reliance on previous compilations of Welsh folklore in favor of Sikes's novel collection of oral folklore. Dorson wrote that British Goblins was disliked by folklorists such as Rhŷs and Edwin Sidney Hartland due to insufficient or unclear citations, leading Rhŷs to cite it "necessarily but with a certain reluctance".
