= Familiar =

Spiritual entity in European folklore

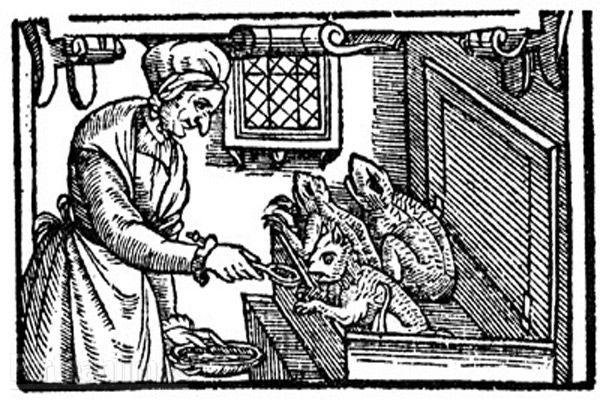
A late-16th-century English illustration of a witch feeding her familiars

In European folklore of the medieval and early modern periods, familiars (strictly familiar spirits, as "familiar" also meant just "close friend" or companion, and may be seen in the scientific name for dog, Canis familiaris) were believed to be supernatural entities, interdimensional beings, or spiritual guardians that would protect or assist witches and cunning folk in their practice of magic, divination, and spiritual insight. According to records of the time, those alleging to have had contact with familiar spirits reported that they could manifest as numerous forms, usually as an animal, but sometimes as a human or humanoid figure, and were described as "clearly defined, three-dimensional... forms, vivid with colour and animated with movement and sound", as opposed to descriptions of ghosts with their "smoky, undefined form[s]".

When they served witches, they were often thought to be malevolent, but when working for cunning folk, they were often considered benevolent (although there was some ambiguity in both cases). The former were often categorized as demons, while the latter were more commonly thought of and described as fairies. The main purpose of familiars was to serve the witch, providing protection for them as they came into their new powers.

Since the 20th century some magical practitioners, including adherents of the neopagan religion of Wicca, use the concept of familiars, due to their association with older forms of magic. These contemporary practitioners use pets or wildlife, or believe that invisible versions of familiars act as magical aides.

== Definitions ==
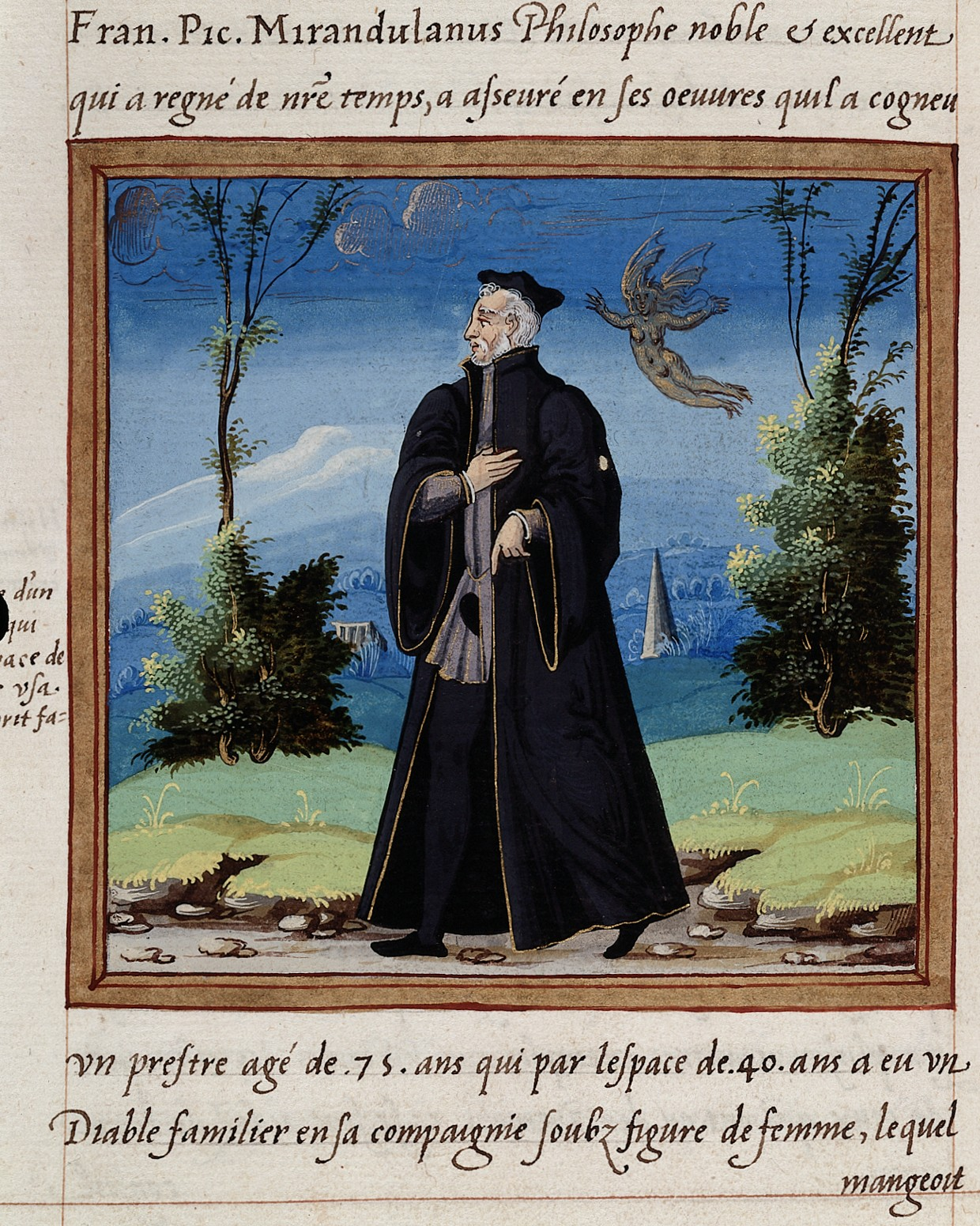
A story of "a priest who for the space of 40 years employed a familiar spirit", illustrated in Elizabeth I of England's copy of the Histoires Prodigieuses by Pierre Boaistuau

Pierre A. Riffard proposed this definition and quotations

A familiar spirit – (alter ego, doppelgänger, personal demon, personal totem, spirit companion) is the double, the alter ego, of an individual. It does not look like the individual concerned. Even though it may have an independent life of its own, it remains closely linked to the individual. The familiar spirit can be an animal (animal companion).

The French poet Charles Baudelaire, a cat fancier, believed in familiar spirits.

It is the familiar spirit of the place;

It judges, presides, inspires Everything in its empire; It is perhaps a fairy or a god? When my eyes, drawn like a magnet

To this cat that I love...

A. P. Elkin studied the belief in familiar spirits among Australian Aboriginal people:

A usual method, or explanation, is that the medicine man sends his familiar spirit (his assistant totem, spirit-dog, spirit-child or whatever the form may be) to gather the information. While this is occurring, the man himself is in a state of receptivity, in sleep or trance. In modern phraseology [spiritism], his familiar spirit would be the control [control spirit].

Mircea Eliade:

The Goldi [Nanai people in Siberia] clearly distinguish between the tutelary spirit (ayami), which chooses the shaman, and the helping spirits (syven), which are subordinate to it and are granted to the shaman by the ayami itself. According to Sternberg the Goldi explain the relations between the shaman and his ayami by a complex sexual emotion. Here is the report of a Goldi shaman. "Once I was asleep on my sick-bed, when a spirit approached me. It was a very beautiful woman. Her figure was very slight, she was no more than half an arshin (71 cm) tall. Her face and attire were quite as those of one of our Gold women... She said: 'I am the ayami of your ancestors, the Shamans. I taught them shamaning. Now I am going to teach you... I love you, I have no husband now, you will be my husband and I shall be a wife unto you. I shall give you assistant spirits. You are to heal with their aid, and I shall teach and help you myself...' Sometimes she comes under the aspect of an old woman, and sometimes under that of a wolf, so she is terrible to look at. Sometimes she comes as a winged tiger... She has given me three assistants—the jarga (the panther), the doonto (the bear) and the amba (the tiger). They come to me in my dreams, and appear whenever I summon them while shamaning. If one of them refuses to come, the ayami makes them obey, but, they say, there are some who do not obey even the ayami. When I am shamaning, the ayami and the assistant spirits are possessing me; whether big or small, they penetrate me, as smoke or vapour would. When the ayami is within me, it is she who speaks through my mouth, and she does everything herself."

== Descriptions ==
Among those accused witches and cunning-folk who described their familiar spirits, there were commonly certain unifying features. The historian Emma Wilby noted how the accounts of such familiars were striking for their "ordinariness" and "naturalism", despite the fact that they were dealing with supernatural entities.

Familiar spirits were most commonly small animals, such as cats, rats, dogs, ferrets, birds, frogs, toads, and hares. There were also cases of wasps and butterflies, as well as pigs, sheep, and horses. Familiar spirits were usually kept in pots or baskets lined with sheep's wool and fed a variety of things including, milk, bread, meat, and blood.

Familiar spirits usually had names and "were often given down-to-earth, and frequently affectionate, nicknames." One example of this was Tom Reid, who was the familiar of the cunning-woman and accused witch Bessie Dunlop, while other examples included Grizell and Gridigut, who were the familiars of 17th-century Huntingdonshire witch Jane Wallis.

An agathion is a familiar spirit which appears in the shape of a human or an animal, or even within a talisman, bottle, or magic ring. It is strongest at midday.

== Relationship with sorcerers ==
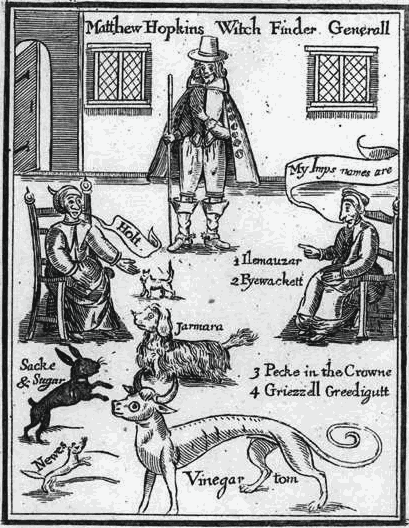
Frontispiece from the witch hunter Matthew Hopkins' The Discovery of Witches (1647), showing witches identifying their familiar spirits

Using her studies into the role of witchcraft and magic in Britain during the Early Modern period as a starting point, the historian Emma Wilby examined the relationship that familiar spirits allegedly had with the witches and cunning-folk in this period.

=== Meeting ===
In the British accounts from the early modern period at least, there were three main types of encounter narrative related to how a witch or cunning person first met their familiar. The first of these was that the spirit spontaneously appeared in front of the individual while they were going about their daily activities, either in their home or outdoors somewhere. Various examples for this are attested in the sources of the time, for instance, Joan Prentice from Essex, England, gave an account when she was interrogated for witchcraft in 1589 claiming that she was "alone in her chamber, and sitting upon a low stool preparing herself to bedward" when her familiar first appeared to her, while the Cornish cunning-woman Anne Jeffries related in 1645 that hers first appeared to her when she was "knitting in an arbour in our garden".

The second manner in which the familiar spirit commonly appeared to magical practitioners in Britain was that they would be given to a person by a pre-existing individual, who was sometimes a family member and at other times a more powerful spirit. For instance, the alleged witch Margaret Ley from Liverpool claimed, in 1667, that she had been given her familiar spirit by her mother when she died, while the Leicestershire cunning-woman Joan Willimot related, in 1618, that a mysterious figure whom she only referred to as her "master", "willed her to open her mouth and he would blow into her a fairy which should do her good. And that she open her mouth, and that presently after blowing, there came out of her mouth a spirit which stood upon the ground in the shape and form of a woman."

In a number of accounts, the cunning person or witch was experiencing difficulty prior to the appearance of the familiar, who offered to aid them. As historian Emma Wilby noted, "their problems... were primarily rooted in the struggle for physical survival—the lack of food or money, bereavement, sickness, loss of livelihood and so on", and the familiar offered them a way out of this by giving them magical powers.

=== Working ===
In some cases, the magical practitioner then made an agreement or entered a pact with their familiar spirit. The length of time that the witch or cunning person worked with their familiar spirit varied between a few weeks through to a number of decades. In most cases, the magical practitioner would conjure their familiar spirit when they needed their assistance, although there are many different ways that they did this: the Essex witch Joan Cunny claimed, in 1589, that she had to kneel down within a circle and pray to Satan for her familiar to appear while the Wiltshire cunning woman Anne Bodenham described, in 1653, that she conjured her familiars by methods learned from books. In some rarer cases there were accounts where the familiars would appear at times when they were unwanted and not called upon, for instance the Huntingdonshire witch Elizabeth Chandler noted, in 1646, that she could not control when her two familiars, named Beelzebub and Trullibub, appeared to her, and had prayed for a god to "deliver her therefrom". It was also believed that familiars "helped diagnose illnesses and the sources of bewitchment and were used for divining and finding lost objects and treasures. Magicians conjured them in rituals, then locked them in bottles, rings and stones. They sometimes sold them as charms, claiming the spirits would ensure success in gambling, love, business or whatever the customer wanted. This sort of familiar was technically not illegal; England's Witchcraft Act 1603 prohibited only evil and wicked spirits".

=== Types ===
Familiars are most common in western European mythology, with some scholars arguing that familiars are only present in the traditions of Great Britain and France. In these areas, three categories of familiars are believed to exist:

- familiar spirits manifesting as humans and humanoids, throughout Western Europe
- divinatory spirits manifesting as animals, in Great Britain and France
- malevolent spirits manifesting as animals, only in Greece

=== Prince Rupert's dog ===
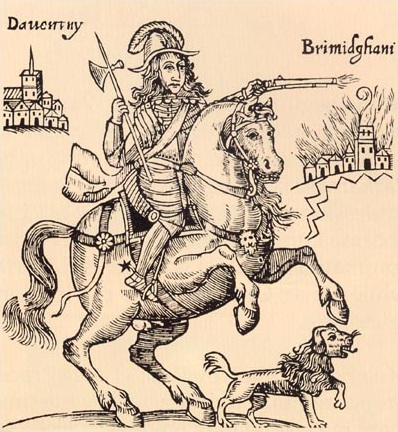
Prince Rupert and his "familiar" dog in a pamphlet titled "The Cruel Practices of Prince Rupert" (1643)

During the English Civil War, the Royalist general Prince Rupert was in the habit of taking his large poodle dog named Boy into battle with him. Throughout the war the dog was greatly feared among the Parliamentarian forces and credited with supernatural powers. As noted by Morgan, the dog was apparently considered a kind of familiar. At the Battle of Marston Moor the dog was shot, allegedly with a silver bullet.

== Witch trials ==
Most data regarding familiars comes from the transcripts of English and Scottish witch trials held during the 16th and 17th centuries. The court system that labeled and tried witches was known as the Essex. The Essex trial of Agnes Sampson of Nether Keith, East Lothian, Scotland, in 1590, presents prosecution testimony regarding a divinatory familiar. This case is fundamentally political, trying Sampson for high treason, and accusing Sampson for employing witchcraft against King James VI. The prosecution asserts Sampson called familiar spirits and resolved her doubtful matter. Another Essex trial is that of Hellen Clark, tried in 1645, in which Clark was compelled to state that the Devil appeared as a "familiar" in the form of a dog.

The English court cases reflect a strong relationship between State's accusations of witchcraft against those who practiced ancient indigenous traditions, including the familiar animal or spirit.

In colonial America animal familiars can be seen in the witch hunts that took place in Salem, Massachusetts, in 1692. Familiar spirits often appear in the visions of the afflicted girls. Although the 1648 law that defined a witch as one who "hath or consulteth with a familiar spirit" had been suspended ten years earlier, association with a familiar spirit was used in the Salem trials as evidence to convict suspected witches. Sarah Good was said to have a yellow bird who sucked between her fingers. Ann Putnam in particular was supposed to have frequently seen the yellow bird in her afflictions. Tituba was said to have seen strange animals that urged her to hurt children, which included a hog, a black dog, a red cat and a black cat. "During the Salem witch trials, there is little account of the practice of animal familiars, although one man was charged with encouraging a dog to attack by way of magical means. The dog, interestingly enough, was tried, convicted, and hanged".

The witch's mark added a sexual component to the familiar spirit and is often found in trial records as a way to convict a suspected witch. The mark was most commonly an extra teat found somewhere on the body and was suspected to be used to suckle the familiar spirits. An example of this can be seen in the Salem witch trials of 1692. For example, Ann Putnam told Martha Corey that, "There is a yellow burd a sucking between your fore finger and midel finger I see it."

== Legacy ==
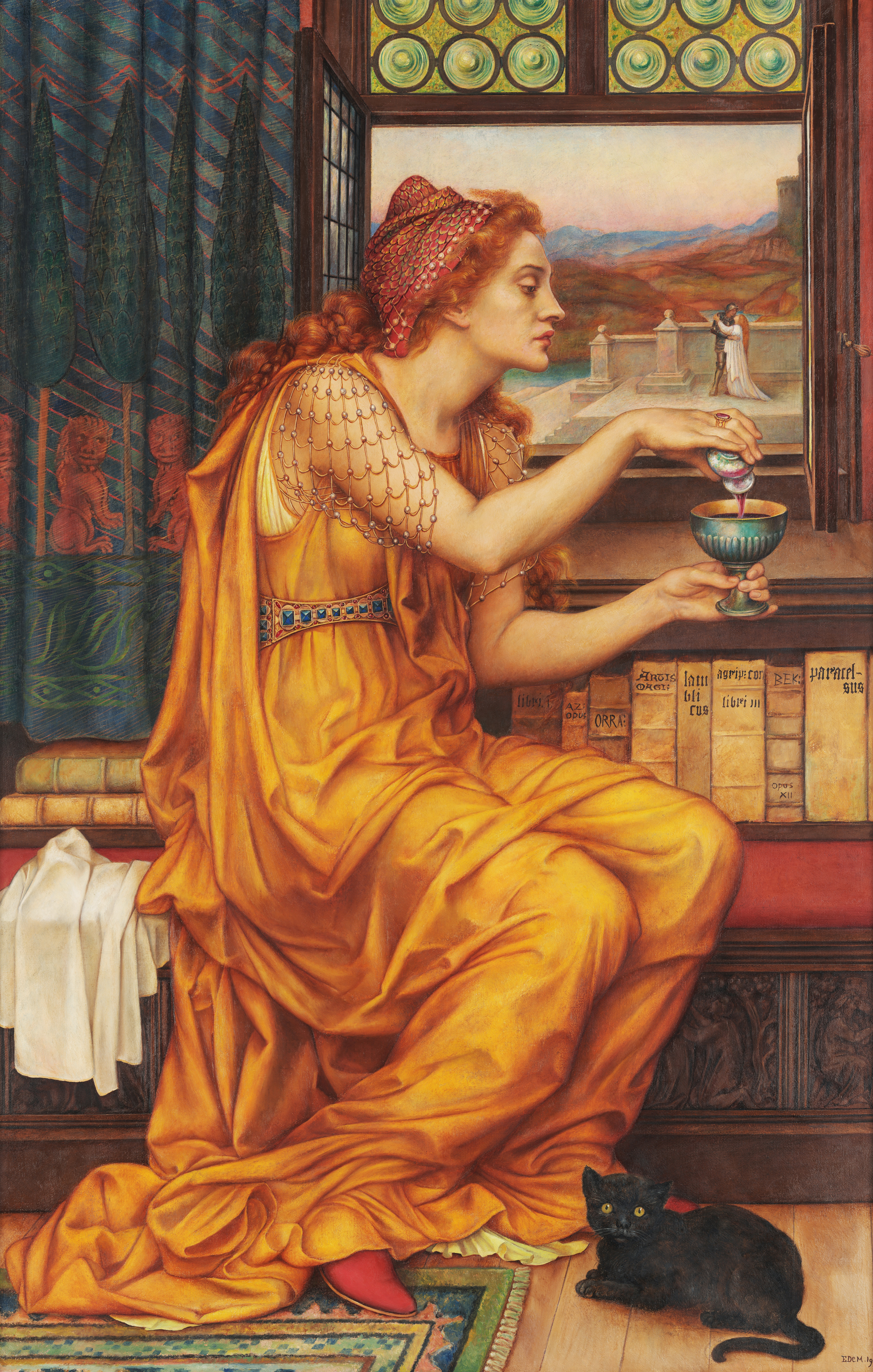
The Love Potion by Evelyn De Morgan, 1903: a witch with a black cat familiar at her feet

=== Historiography ===
Recent scholarship on familiars exhibits the depth and respectability absent from earlier demonological approaches. The study of familiars has grown from an academic topic in folkloric journals to a general topic in popular books and journals incorporating anthropology, history and other disciplines. James Sharpe, in The Encyclopedia of Witchcraft: the Western Tradition, states: "Folklorists began their investigations in the 19th Century [and] found that familiars figured prominently in ideas about witchcraft."

In the first decades of the 20th century, familiars are identified as "niggets", which are "creepy-crawly things that witches kept all over them".

=== In fiction ===
Familiars have appeared in many works of fiction, from William Shakespeare to the 21st century, where it "may be the witch's servant or master–or comic relief".
In the Dungeons & Dragons role-playing game, familiars are bonded to characters of the wizard or sorcerer classes, whom they often serve "in the role of spy or messenger", an instance of "a distinctly zoophilic emphasis on the development of human/animal relationships" appearing in the game. The familiar usually comes in the form of "a small, mundane animal", although it "is unusually tough and intelligent", but may be a more supernatural creature in some instances of the game.
When analyzing culturally coded imagery from Harry Potter, Dhiwangkara and Ruslianti observed that in the character of Hedwig, the snow owl, author J. K. Rowling "might bring the culture from the history about the witches' familiar through the diachronic aspect" but aware if negative connotations "instead of representing it, she broke the culture and redefined it positively by showing the owl as one of Harry's trustworthy friends."

== See also ==
- Alebrije
- Barang (magic)
- Black cat
- Boye (dog)
- Daemon (mythology)
- DMT
- Fylgja
- Genius (mythology)
- Household deity
- Imp
- İye
- Kuladevata
- Magid (Jewish mysticism)
- Nagual
- Pelesit
- Pillan
- Power animal
- Púca, Irish folklore
- Psilocybin
- Qareen
- Shikigami
- Spiriduş
- Tomte
- Torngarsuk
- Toyol
- Tulpa
- Tutelary deity
- Wayob
- Wekufe
- Yekyua
