= Edmund Jones (preacher) =

Welsh preacher (1702–1793)

- Born: 1 April 1702; Aberystruth, Monmouthshire
- Died: 1793 (aged 90–91)
- Occupations: Independent Minister and author
- Writing career
- Genres: Theology, Welsh folklore, Welsh mythology
- Notable works: A geographical, historical, and religious account of the parish of Aberystruth; A Relation of Apparitions of Spirits in the Principality of Wales

Edmund Jones (1702–1793) (also known as Yr Hen Broffwyd (The Old Prophet) was a Welsh Dissenting Minister, itinerant preacher, spiritualist, historian and writer. As leading religious figure, Jones is remembered for his role in the eighteenth-century religious Revival and his debates on the movements theology.

As a writer, Jones is notable for his topographical works on the Gwent valleys, his recording of Welsh folklore and his sincere belief in the existence of spirits and supernatural creatures in the age of enlightenment, a belief which brought much ridicule from other Welsh intellectuals of his time.

== Early life ==
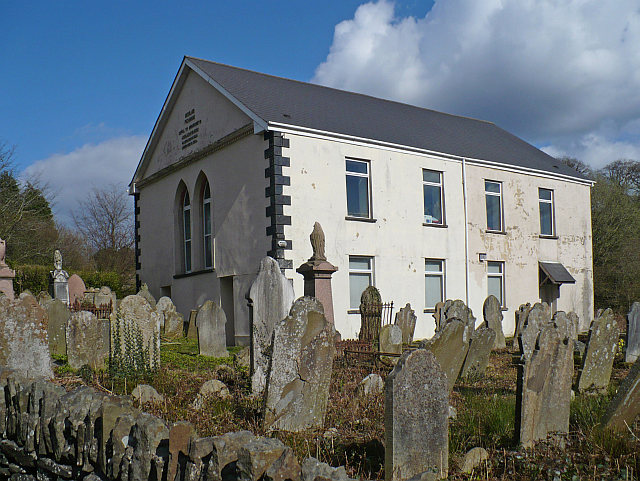
The Independent chapel at Penmaen

Jones was born in the ancient parish of Aberystruth, on 1 April 1702. He was the son of John and Catherine Lewis of Pen-llwyn (a small farm near today's Nantyglo railway station). Jones' parents were members of the Independent church at Penmaen where he began preaching in 1722, gaining recognition for his part in the public debates on adult baptism in 1727 and 1728.

Jones was ordained as a Minister of the chapel at Penmaen in 1734, and would continue ministering to this congregation even after his move to Pontypool in July 1740. According to George Whitefield, Jones sold his books for £15 in order to complete the building of his new Pontypool Meeting house at Transh.

== Influence on Nonconformism ==
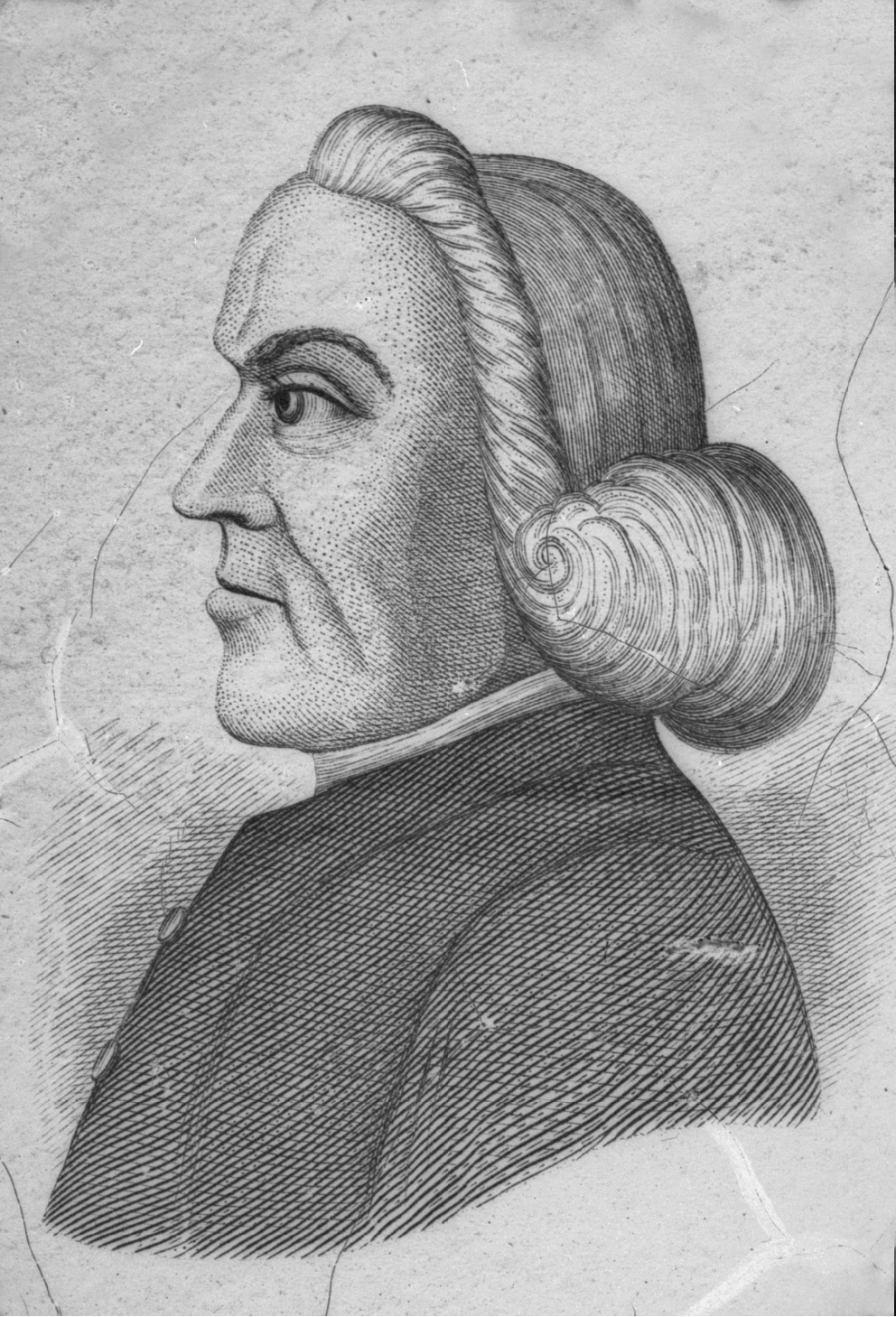
Howell Harris

As a Minister of the chapel at Penmaen, Jones was noted as a zealous Evangelical and Calvinist. In March 1738, Jones was responsible for inviting Howell Harris to preach to his congregation, the first time Harris had preached in Monmouthshire. This would prove to be a key event in the early Welsh Methodist revival, as many of the independent leaders in the county would be subsequently converted to Harris's cause.

Jones actively encouraged new societies at Defynnog and Neath, to form themselves into Independent churches, as Jones was fearful that the rapid progress of Methodism throughout Nonconformists society would eventually draw many of them to the Established Church.

This was a divergence from Harris who wanted Methodists to join the established church with the hope that they would reform the established institutions from within. Despite these differences, the two remained friends until Harris's death and Jones would continue to be admired by Whitefield and by Selina Hastings, Countess of Huntingdon.

=== Published works ===
"If any think I am too credulous in these relations and speak of things of which I myself have had no experience I must let them know they are mistaken."

— Edmund Jones, confirming his own experiences of fairies.

==== Early writings ====
Jones published works in both Welsh and English, early works include "Dail Pren y Bywyd" (Leaves from the Tree of Life) in 1745 and "Samson’s Hair" printed at Trevecca in 1777. In 1779 Jones published "A Geographical Historical and Religious Account of the Parish of Aberystwith in the county of Monmouth". The book features a comprehensive description of the Ystwith, Ebwy and the Tilery valleys, memoirs of several notable local people and biographical anecdotes of religious people as well as discussions of the areas various independent congregations and historical notices relative to religion.

==== Spiritualism of Wales ====
The following year Jones published A Relation of Apparitions of Spirits in the Principality of Wales. In this book, Jones asserts that spirits and fairies frequented the parish of Aberystruth more than any other part of Wales. As evidence, Jones recounts his own experiences of supernatural beings and relates the testimonies of a variety of local people who believed they had encountered similar beings.

Despite his upstanding position in the independent religious community, Jones was maligned for the sincerity of his beliefs in this work. John Evans lambasted the work as "indicative of the mental imbecility of the author and the credulous state of the country" and "a farrago of the most astonishing superstitions, in all of which he firmly believed", while he also used the work to denigrate the locality, population and the independent ministries themselves: "It serves also to show the mental tendency in these mountainous and sequestered regions to credit the stories of superstition and with what facility hypocrisy or fanaticising may engage and enslave the affections of minds thus previously prepared by the admission of falsehood."

As late as 1893, the sincerity of Jones' beliefs and his competence as a religious leader were still a subject of literary discussion. Referring to Jones only by his sobriquet, Charles Ashton wrote that "There was almost no end to the superstition of the "Hen Broffwyd o Bontypwl" (Old Prophet of Pontypool).

==== Later writings ====
Jones published "Goleuni yr Efengyl" (The Light of the Gospel) in 1785 and "The Same In Welsh" a year later. Jones also published numerous volumes of sermons throughout his life. His nine-year diaries were nearly destroyed, but were rescued from use as wrapping paper in a Pontypool shop shortly after his death. Today the diaries are maintained by the National Library of Wales.

=== Personal life ===
Many authors noted that Jones was known as "Yr Broffwyd" (The Prophet) or "Yr Hen Broffwyd" (The Old Prophet). While touring through Monmouthshire in the 1870s, American folklorist Wirt Sikes recorded numerous incidents of Jones using the gift of prophecy. Stories included predicting a torrential rain that would keep all the congregation from attending a future sermon and giving away the last of his and his wife's food to the needy after correctly predicting that "a messenger with food and raiment" would arrive at nine the following morning.

Jones regularly travelled extensively as an itinerant preacher throughout Wales and England throughout his life and remained an active preacher well into his old age. Even in his late eighties, Jones travelled some 400 miles around North Wales in 1782, preaching twice a day. At the age of 87, he was said to have preached 405 times throughout the year.

Despite remaining relatively poor his entire life, Jones was noted for his generosity. He was said to have freely given away his own greatcoat and even his shirt on to the poor people he met during his life. After moving to Pontypool, Jones spent the rest of his life residing at a small house called "Pen-tranch isaf". The house was preserved in this condition into the twentieth century with a small room called "the Prophet’s Study" said to be that in which he wrote his books.

Jones was married once and the marriage was said to be a notably happy one. It was even said that his friend, George Whitefield only decided to find himself a wife after witnessing how happy Jones was in his own marriage to Mary.

== In music ==
In 2017, the Welsh folk band Calan released "Apparition" as the lead single for their Solomon album. The title and lyrics referenced Edmund Jones and his A Relation of Apparitions of Spirits in the Principality of Wales.

== Notable works ==
- Dail Pren y Bywyd (1745)
- Samson's hair: an eminent representation of the Church of God in two parts (1777, Trefecca)
- A geographical, historical and religious account of the parish of Aberystruth in the county of Monmouth to which are added memoirs of several persons of note who lived in the said parish (1779, Trefeca)
- A Relation of Apparitions of Spirits in the Principality of Wales (1780)
