= Tommyknocker (disambiguation) =

A Tommyknocker, or knocker, is a supernatural being associated with mining in Cornish, Welsh, and American folklore.

Tommyknocker or Tommyknockers may also refer to:

- Tommyknocker (producer) (born 1977), Italian hardcore techno producer
- The Tommyknockers, a 1987 science fiction novel by Stephen King
  - The Tommyknockers (miniseries), a 1993 miniseries adapted from the novel
- Tommyknocker Brewery, a brewery in Idaho Springs, Colorado
- "Tommyknockers", 1990 song by Blind Guardian from Tales from the Twilight World
