= Coblyn =

Mythical gnome-like creature

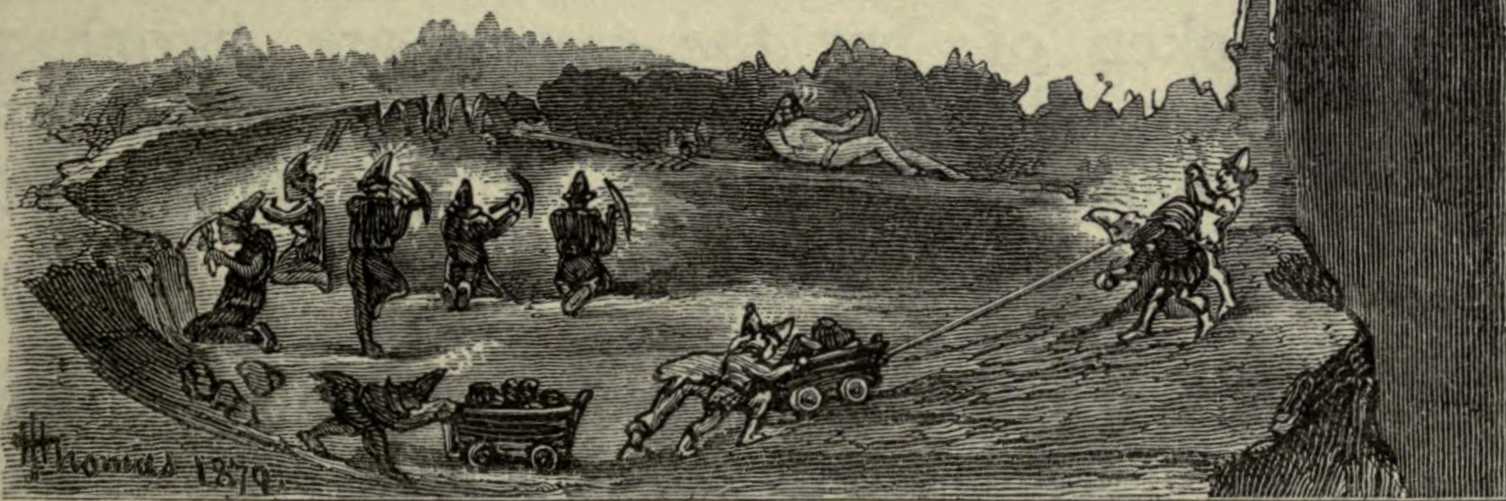
- Illustration of coblynau at work by T.H. Thomas

Creature information
- Grouping: Tylwyth Teg; Mine spirit
- Similar entities: Tommyknockers; Haus-schmiedlein; Dwarves; Gnomes

Origin
- Country: Wales
- Habitat: Mines; Caves

A coblyn (also spelled koblyn, plural coblynau or coblynod) is a mythical gnome-like creature that is said to haunt the mines and quarries of Wales and areas of Welsh settlements in America.

== Description and reports ==
In British Goblins, Wirt Sikes describes coblynau as friendly fairies, short (between half a yard tall and just shorter than humans), very ugly, and often dressed in miner's clothing, carrying tools with which they enthusiastically but ineffectually imitate the work of the miners. Like the Knockers of Cornish folklore, they often help miners to the richest veins of ore or other treasures by their peculiar knocking sound. They may throw rocks at miners if disrespected, but the rocks are typically harmless. Miners generally consider coblynau to be good luck. The coblynau may cease their helpful knocking if they can tell the miners are overly greedy.

Coblynau sometimes leave the mines on holiday. One account tells of a group of children seeing a group of fifteen or sixteen coblynau, dressed in all red and wearing yellow-spotted red handkerchiefs around their heads, Morris dancing in a Bodfari field. One of them was described as having a copper-coloured face.

== Word origin ==
The word Coblyn is related to the English word Goblin, and may derive from a Germanic source akin to the German Kobold, via the French Gobelin. It appears in William Salesbury's 1547 Welsh-English dictionary as koblyn, where it translates to "a goblin".

== Appearances in media ==
Coblynau are mentioned in the Constantine episode "The Darkness Beneath", but the description of the creatures given is closer to knockers.

The word Coblyn is used in Final Fantasy XIV as the name of a type of cave-dwelling rock creature similar in appearance to a hermit crab.

== See also ==
- Bluecap
- Gnome
- Knocker (folklore)
