= Bucca (mythological creature) =

Sea-spirit in Cornish folklore

Creature information
- Other name: Bocka (Cornish)
- Grouping: Mythological creature Fairy; Sprite

Origin
- First attested: In folklore
- Country: United Kingdom
- Region: Cornwall

Bucca (Cornish, SWF: bocka, pl. bockas, bockyas) is a male sea-spirit in Cornish folklore, a merman, that inhabited mines and coastal communities as a hobgoblin during storms. The mythological creature is a type of water spirit likely related to the Púca from Irish, the Pwca from Welsh folklore, and the female mari-morgans, a type of mermaid from Welsh and Breton mythology. Rev W. S. Lach-Szyrma, one 19th-century writer on Cornish antiquities, suggested the Bucca had originally been an ancient pagan deity of the sea such as Irish Nechtan or British Nodens, though his claims are mainly conjecture. Folklore however records votive food offerings made on the beach similar to those made to the subterranean Knockers and may represent some form of continuity with early or pre-Christian Brittonic belief practices.

== Etymology ==
In 1611, in the Cornish language book Gwreans an bys known in English as The Creation of the World the Bucca is mentioned and some believe that the word is a borrowing into Cornish from Old English 'puca'.

Use of the term Púka in Ireland, however, may predate the arrival of Norse settlers and could be an alternative origin of the word with considerable cultural exchange with Ireland occurring in the Early Christian era.

== Folklore ==
In 1890, the Cornish folklorist William Bottrell stated that:

It is uncertain whether Bucka can be regarded as one of the fairy tribe; old people, within my remembrance, spoke of a Bucka Gwidden and a Bucka Dhu – by the former they meant good spirit, and by the latter an evil one, now known as Bucka boo. I have been told, by persons of credit, that within the last forty years it was a usual practice with Newlyn and Mousehole fishermen to leave on the sand at night a portion of their catch for Bucka. Probably from this observance the common nickname of Newlyn Buckas was derived. An old rhyme says:

'Penzance boys up in a tree,
Looking as wisht (i.e. haunted) as wisht can be;
Newlyn buckas as strong as oak,
Knocking them down at every poke.'

In keeping with Bottrell's findings, various folkloric investigations around the same time that Bucca seems to have featured in two forms, Bucca Widn (White Bucca) and Bucca Dhu (Black Bucca). Bucca also seems to associated with the wind, in Penzance it was customary to refer to storms that emanated from a southwesterly direction as "Bucca calling"; sailors and fishermen also believe that Bucca's voice carried on the wind. Bucca was also sometimes described as a tin-mining spirit, which may indicate a wider fertility origin than that of the sea.

Also in the 19th century, there were reports of fishermen venerating Bucca with offerings. These included food offerings, particularly of fish, given to Bucca on beaches. One such beach used for this purpose was the area of Newlyn known formerly as Park an Grouse (in Cornish meaning 'the field of the cross') where a stone cross was allegedly once situated. Similar offerings were recorded on the beaches of Mousehole and Newlyn "Town" (the area now known as Newlyn Cliff).

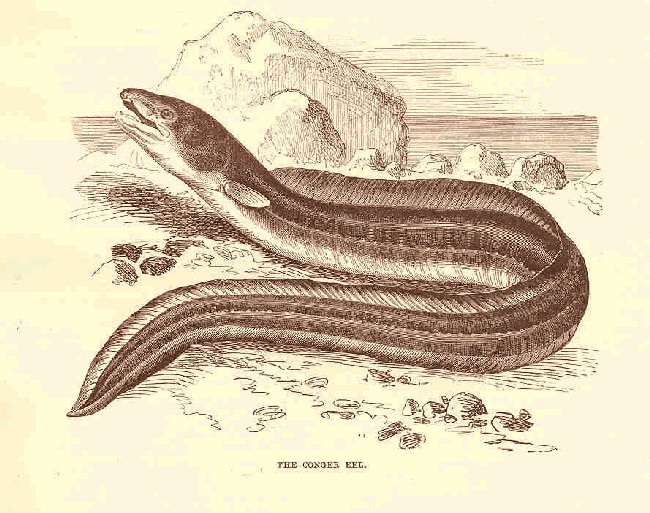

The Tale of the Sea Bucca describes the Bucca inhabiting Lamorna Cove with the dark brown skin of a conger eel and a tangle of seaweed for hair and given to swimming in the waves, lying in the sea caverns or sitting among the rocks with the birds. He was a very lonely creature who had once been a human prince cursed by a witch, but was very fond of children. He assisted the Lamorna fishermen by driving fish into their nets and crabs into their pots, yet was capable of terrible vengeance and so they avoided him leaving a share of their catch on the beach to placate him.

During the 18th and 19th centuries, folklorists generally interpreted the popular beliefs and practices they found as survivals from or relics of Catholicism, equating such 'survivals' with Paganism. Some also saw the continuation of practices from pre-Christian times. This idea has been discredited in recent years by academic folklorists. although this notion persists in the popular imagination. There is little surprise that the Reverend W. S. Lach-Szyrma should have interpreted Bucca as the "storm god of the old Cornish", equating this figure with the Devil.

As a bucca-boo this spirit was also invoked by parents as a bogeyman figure to frighten children into proper behaviour, especially those who wouldn't stop crying.

Boucca was known to the Basque witches as 'Basa-Juan', the equivalent of the French 'Homme de Bouc', 'Goat man'.

In the 19th century a new road was built between Penzance and Land's End and the Tolcarne River (main stream at the outskirts of Newlyn) was bridged; this area was called Bucca's pass.

== Modern influence ==
Neopagan groups, principally the Witchcraft coven of Ros An Bucca, have begun to acknowledge the Bucca in their rites.

In New Zealand, Bucca Witchcraft (variant spelling Boucca) began as a tradition in 1988. Founded by an Alexandrian initiate. Boucca Wicca is mentioned in New Truth newspaper in 1995. Jean de Cabalis has developed an entire esoteric corpus structured around the 'Bucca Dhu', the Storm Winds which Cabalis calls 'Boucca Wicca'. Cabalis uses an ancient Slovak rendering 'Boucca'. The links between Ireland and Slovakia are known to stretch back to 1000 BC. "A longstanding historical connection Links between Slovakia and Ireland stretch back to 1000 BC. Celtic tribes living in Central Europe are known to have migrated westwards to Britain and Ireland. Artefacts and the remains of their settlements can still be seen including at Devín Castle near Bratislava." EOQ. The Slovak spelling Boucca is used within Brian Bates book 'The Web of Wyrd' to refer to Earth Spirit. In 1997 the Pagan Alliance (New Zealand) newsletter, administrators Jeff & Louise state they are heavily influenced by Boucca Wicca.

In the children's book Thomas and the Tinners (1995) by Jill Paton Walsh, Buccas are presented as fairies who work in Cornish tin mines, granting wishes in exchange for food (see knockers).

In the historical fiction book The Sea Child (2026) by Linda Wilgus, the Sea Bucca helps to rescue a drowning child off the coast of Cornwall who later grows up and as the protagonist of the book, seeks to understand her origin and draw to the sea. The work draws on several aspect of folklore tied to the Bucca, such as leaving gifts for the creature before a journey at sea to seek protection.
