= Nantyglo =

Coordinates: 51.78283°N 3.16980°W

Welsh: Nant-y-glo
- Location within Blaenau Gwent
- Population: 4,635
- OS grid reference: SO195105
- Principal area: Blaenau Gwent
- Preserved county: Gwent
- Country: Wales
- Sovereign state: United Kingdom
- Post town: Ebbw Vale
- Postcode district: NP23
- Dialling code: 01495
- Police: Gwent
- Fire: South Wales
- Ambulance: Welsh
- UK Parliament: Blaenau Gwent and Rhymney
- Senedd Cymru – Welsh Parliament: Blaenau Gwent

Nantyglo (from Welsh Nant-y-glo 'brook of coal') is a village in the ancient parish of Aberystruth and county of Monmouth situated deep within the South Wales Valleys between Blaina and Brynmawr in the county borough of Blaenau Gwent.

== Governance ==
An electoral ward in the same name exists. The population of this ward at the 2011 census was 4,635.

== Places of interest ==
Parc Nant y Waun is a nature reserve incorporating 22 hectares of grassland, mires and reservoirs which was officially opened in 2007. Home to many wildlife species, it includes a picnic area, outdoor classroom and an angling club. Wesley Methodist Church was built in 1825.

== Notable people ==
- Edmund Jones (preacher) also known as Yr Hen Broffwyd (The Old Prophet), a Welsh Dissenting Minister, itinerant preacher, spiritualist, historian and writer
- David Keith Brookman, Baron Brookman
- Flash Morgan Webster (WWE wrestler)
- Tom Clapp
- William Evans
- William Gore
- Keith Jones
- Trish Law (born 1954), Member of the Welsh Assembly
- David Nash
- Samuel Baldwyn Rogers known as "Iron-Bottom" Rogers, metallurgical chemist
- Nick Smith, MP for Blaenau Gwent and Rhymney now lives in the area but was raised in nearby Tredegar and then moved to London until his election as the MP for the area.
- Jack Williams VC, John Henry Williams, the most decorated Welsh non-commissioned officer of all time
- Bob Catley (politician), Dr Robert Catley former Australian Politician (Federal Member for Adelaide), academic, and author. Born in Nantyglo.

== Nantyglo and Blaina Town Council ==
Nantyglo and Blaina Town Council is made up of 16 unpaid, elected members representing the communities of Nantyglo and Blaina (with eight from each). Full elections of town councillors normally take place every five years, on the first Thursday in May.

The last set of elections took place on 4 May 2017.

The current political makeup of the council for 2017–2022 is as follows:

Affiliation	Members
Independent	10
Labour	4
vacancies	2
Total	16

The Town Council owns and operates Salem Chapel on High Street, Blaina. The council is currently undertaking the renovation of the chapel to convert it into a museum and tourist attraction to display the religious, industrial and political history of the communities. Even though the main focus is on Chartism, this being where many of the movement's leaders came from and the point from which the 1839 March on Newport began, the chapel will continue to be used as a place of worship for the community.

The Town Council sponsors and organizes numerous annual events, including the ARC Awards – made to those members of the community who have achieved so much for the benefit of the area and its people – and the annual School Sports Event.

The council's civic head is the Town Mayor who chairs the meetings of Council and is supported by a Deputy Town Mayor, both of them being appointed annually from amongst the Councillors (usually from the majority group). At its annual general meeting the Council appoints a Leader of the Council who is normally the leader of the ruling majority group. This post is currently (November 2018) held by Councillor Glyn Movan (Independent).

The council also has numerous committees operating under various remits such as, amongst others, Finance, Highways, and Planning. Each committee is headed by a councillor appointed to chair its meetings.

The council's day-to-day running is undertaken by the Town Clerk, a Chief Finance Officer / Responsible Finance Officer, and the Assistant Town Clerk who provide clerical, financial, and legal advice.

== History ==
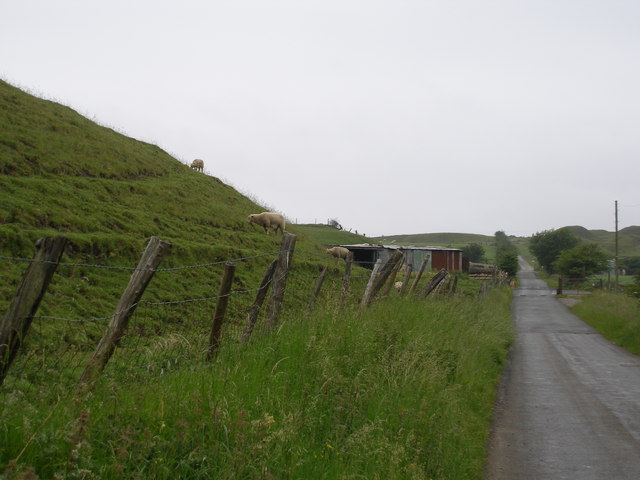
Pond Road NantygloSheep graze on the side of an old spoil heap

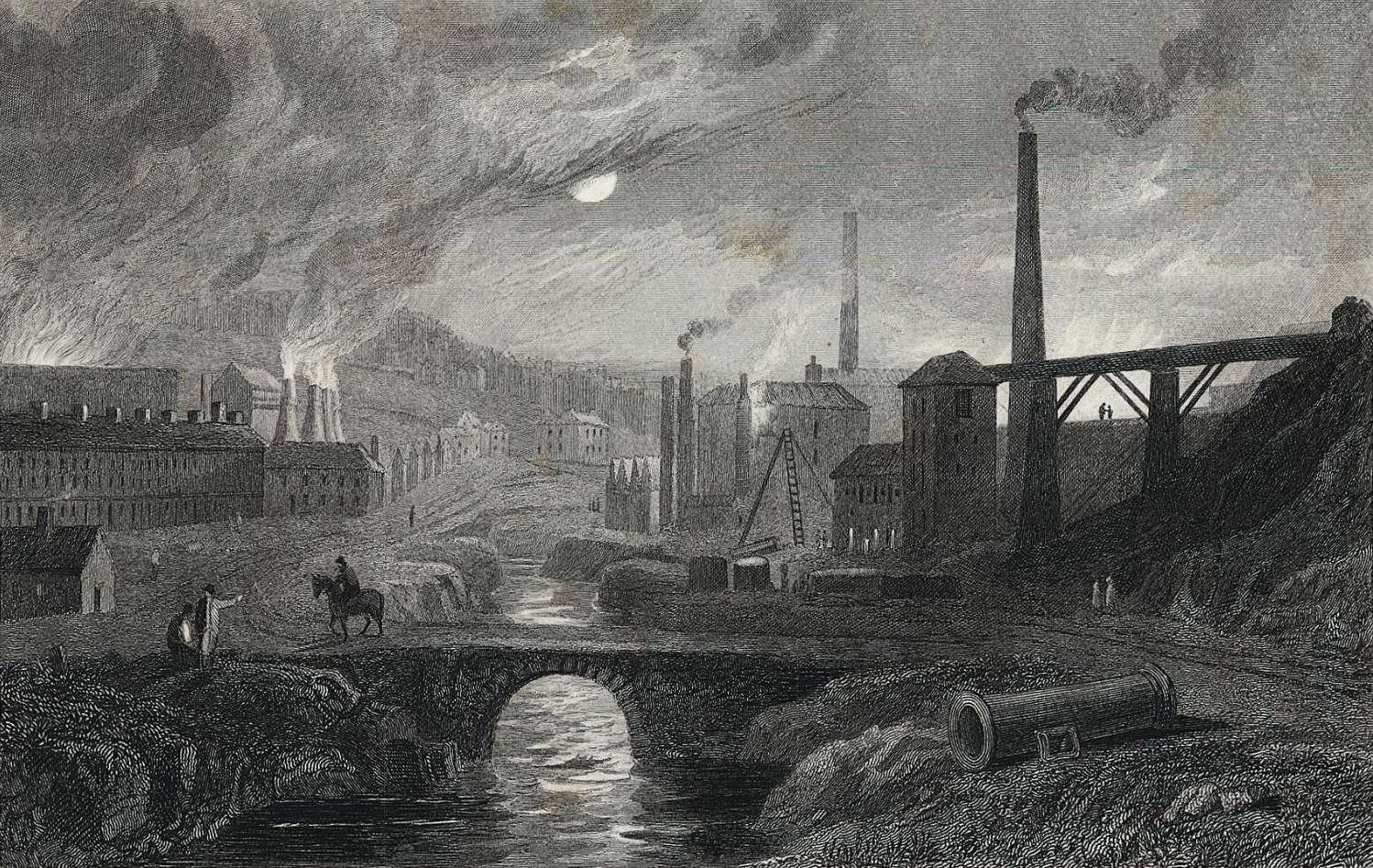
Nantyglo Ironworks 1820 "The immense iron-works of Nant y Glo, which present so extraordinary an appearance, and seem to the distant spectator as if the whole surrounding country were in flames, were originally commenced by Hill, Hertford, and Co., and were held under lease from the owners of Blaenavon works. They were finished, at a vast expense, in 1795; and after being wrought a year, were discontinued for a time, on account of a dispute among the proprietors. They then consisted of two furnaces, several forges, a steam engine, and the necessary buildings and machinery for smelting and forging, but have since become of vast extent and importance."

=== Nantyglo Ironworks ===
During the middle of the 19th century, Nantyglo was one of the most important iron producing centres in the world.

In March 1811 Matthew Wayne (1780–1853) furnace manager at Cyfarthfa and Joseph Bailey, nephew of Richard Crawshay of Cyfarthfa, together purchased the lease of the existing but long stopped ironworks at Nantyglo.

They were so successful in reviving the works that by 1820 Matthew Wayne was able to sell-out and set up his own business at the Gadlys, Aberdare and Joseph's brother, Crawshay Bailey, took Wayne's place in the Nantyglo ironworks partnership.

Turning Nantyglo into one of the great ironworks of the kingdom the two brothers, by 1827, had seven blast furnaces operating at Nantyglo and added the nearby Beaufort Ironworks to their business in 1833 putting their sister's son, William Partridge (1800–1862) in charge.

Joseph Bailey, whose wife had died in 1827, remarried in 1830 and retired from personal direction of Nantyglo to live at Glanusk Park Crickhowell and manage his very extensive landed estates.

Crawshay Bailey continued to live at Ty Mawr, Nantyglo, and ran the iron-works. In the 1840s he retired to Llanfoist House, Abergavenny, leaving direction to his nephew, Joseph's son, Richard Bailey (1816–1853) who died in Dijon France and was succeeded by his younger brother Henry, described in 1868 as managing partner.

At their height c.1844 the Baileys employed 3,000 men and 500 women and children in their ironworks and coal mining operation.

The Bailey interests disposed of the Nantyglo works by 1869–70.

=== Round towers ===
After the Battle of Waterloo and the final defeat of Napoleon there was a general slump in iron manufacture, although Nantyglo was the only ironworks which actually increased its exports, and the high cost of wheat caused acute unrest throughout the country. Fearful of unrest (which did not eventuate) Matthew Wayne and Joseph Bailey had built two fortified towers, the Nantyglo Round Towers in 1816.

=== Link with Chartism 1839 ===
Zephaniah Williams (1795–1874) a Master Collier and innkeeper, keeping the Royal Oak Inn at Nantyglo, from where he used to pay his colliers, was a free thinking man in religious matters and the local Working Men's Association met at his home. Williams emerged as a natural leader during the Chartist movement in south east Wales. Along with John Frost and William Jones, he led a large column of men from the Nantyglo area to march south on the Westgate Hotel, Newport, site of what is sometimes regarded as the greatest armed rebellion in 19th century Britain.

For his part in the 1839 Chartist Newport Rising at Newport, Monmouthshire he was convicted and deported to Australia. He died there a prosperous man in 1874.

== International links ==
Nantyglo has close links with its twinned sister city of Nanty Glo, Pennsylvania.
