= Charles Conway (artist) =

Welsh polymath

Charles Conway (8 February 1820 – 11 June 1884) was a Welsh industrialist, botanist, artist and engraver.

== Background ==
Conway was born in Pontnewydd, Monmouthshire, the child of Benjamin Conway (1791–1863), owner of the Pontnewydd tinplate works and Ann (née Evans) his wife. His uncle Charles Conway (1797–1860) had been a botanist and lepidopterist who also had a large collection of fossils and a meteorological station at Pontnewydd (and Monmouth); his nephew, Charles Conway (fl.1870), was also an artist, engraver, and botanist. Items from the collections of the three Charles Conways initiated the botanical collection of the National Museum.

The Conway family were prominent members of the Baptists in Monmouthshire, but there was a complaint from the denomination's Welsh-speakers that the presence of an English-speaking family led to too much English being used in the denomination's meetings and services.

== Career ==
Conway worked as one of the directors of the Benjamin Conway tinplate company, becoming managing director of the company on his father's death. He was a Justice of the Peace on the Monmouthshire bench and chairman of the Llanfrechfa Local Board. He served on the board of guardians of the Pontypool Poor Union. He was one of the directors of Cwmbran and Pontnewydd Gas Company.

Conway is mostly remembered for his recreational activities. He collected and studied plants, birds, and shells. He was a capable artist, a sculptor, and he decorated vessels, examples of which were exhibited at the Fine Art Exhibition of 1881. Above all he was a superb engraver. His engravings were used to illustrate scientific publications, such as Fossil Flora by John Lindley and Sir William Hooker, Botany by James Sowerby, and also in the publications mainly under Sowerby's direction relating to illustrations of greenhouse plants. He was also very interested in Welsh folklore and collected and published some examples. He won an eisteddfod award in Cardiff for a series of engravings depicting folklore. Shortly before his death he was commissioned to write a series of fairy tales illustrated with engravings for Red Dragon magazine. He began to engrave a series of Monmouthshire trees with the intention of publishing them under the title Silva Silurica but died before finishing the work. This series became part of the T. H. Thomas collection at the National Museums and Galleries of Wales.

== Death ==
In 1884, he died unmarried at his home in Pontnewydd aged 64, and his remains were buried in the Conway family burial yard at the Baptist chapel, Pontrhydyrun. The Pontnewydd tinplate works went into decline after his death.
