= Samuel Baldwyn Rogers =

British chemist, inventor and painter

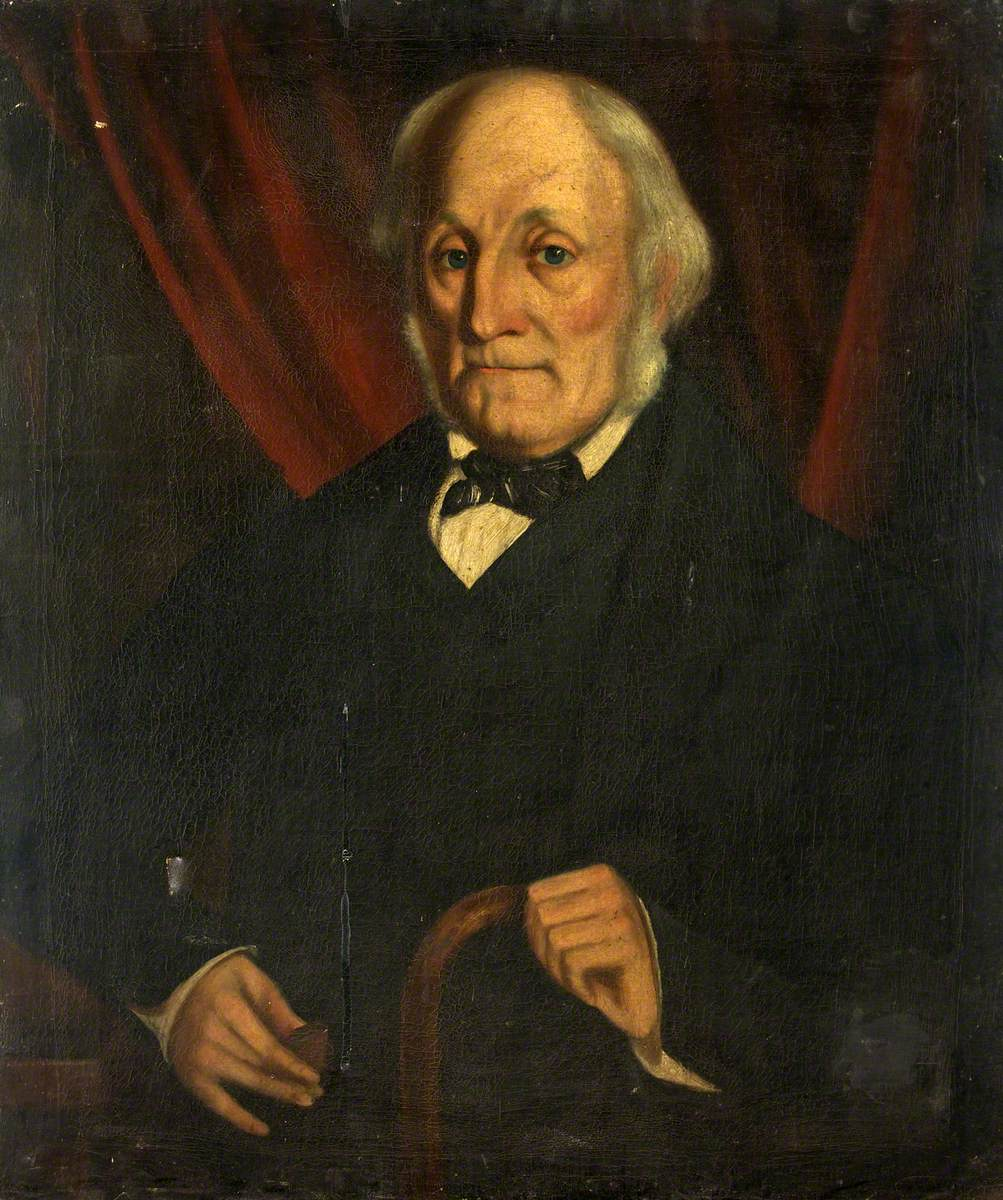
- Born: 1778; Ludlow, Shropshire, England
- Died: 6 September 1863 (aged 85); Newport, Monmouthshire, Wales
- Occupations: Metallurgical chemist, inventor, printer, pamphleteer
- Years active: c.1805–1860

Samuel Baldwyn Rogers (abt. 1778 – 6 September 1863) was a British metallurgical chemist, inventor, printer and radical pamphleteer. He is known for his influence in the iron making industry of south Wales, and for his varied writings, especially on engineering and transport infrastructure. He became known as "Iron-Bottom" Rogers of Nant-y-glo.

== Biography ==
=== Early life and career ===
According to census records, Rogers was born in Ludlow, Shropshire, England, but little is known of his early life. By 1805, he was resident in Chepstow, Monmouthshire, where he had a bookshop and printing business. In 1806 he produced a pamphlet, A Description of the Town and Neighbourhood of Chepstow, based on the writings of Archdeacon Coxe, and in 1807 married Anne Whitford of nearby Mounton. Their first two children were baptised in Chepstow in 1809.

He left Chepstow following a financial dispute, and moved to Pontypool. There, he worked in a "Hydrogen Laboratory", helping to manufacture coal gas. Rogers was apparently self-taught, and began developing his ideas in metallurgical chemistry and technology, including techniques for improving the manufacture of coke and sulphuric acid, and in the engineering of coke ovens and blast furnaces. He also advertised a "Westphalian Essence", made from coal tar, vinegar, and port wine, for preserving and flavouring food.

=== Inventor of iron-bottomed puddling furnace ===
Rogers returned to Chepstow by 1817, setting up as a printer and illuminating his shop with coal gas which he manufactured himself. That year, a further six of his children were baptised in Chepstow. Rogers then began working at Pontymister iron works, around 1818. He spent time developing ideas for improving the removal of sulphur from iron, which involved a water-cooled iron-bottomed puddling furnace, an improvement on the earlier sand-bottomed furnace developed by Henry Cort. He wrote about his proposal in technical journals, and acquired the nickname of "Mr. Iron-Bottom" (or, later, "Old Iron-Bottom"). At the time, the idea was rejected by ironmasters including William Crawshay. Rogers was unable to afford the cost of claiming a patent, but over time his idea became widely adopted as standard. Iron-bottomed furnaces were used at Ebbw Vale in 1825, and soon afterwards at Nantyglo. The innovation greatly improved the yield of bar iron from pig iron, by reducing the amount of iron lost into the sand bottom, previously used.

Discouraged by the initial rejection of his ideas, Rogers moved to London for most of the 1820s, probably working in a printing works, but returned to Chepstow by 1830. By this time he was described as a mineral metallurgical chemist, and was hired to remodel the newly built town gasworks. This he did successfully, but was dismissed for demanding too much money. After leaving Chepstow in 1831, he was hired by Crawshay Bailey as a chemist and metallurgist, to work and advise at his iron works, mainly at Nantyglo.

=== Pamphleteer ===
Rogers was a prolific writer of articles and pamphlets. In 1816, he wrote a pamphlet proposing the wider use of waste industrial products such as coal tar and ammonium sulphate in such useful products as lubricants, fertilisers, paints, dyes, and cosmetics, and also suggesting the use of coal gas for lighting and heating large areas. Around the same time, he proposed the building of a thousand miles of railways in England and Wales, and in 1826 proposed a network of railways in south Wales. In the 1830s, he wrote anonymously on the iron industry, as "A Gentleman of Great Attainments", in the Monmouthshire Merlin newspaper. In 1841, in A Letter to the Owners and Workers of Coal Mines, he outlined proposals for a national grid of gas pipelines, running alongside railway lines.

In 1842, his proposal for a bridge across the Severn estuary was first published in his booklet Samarias, or Working Benefit Societies, and the concept was developed in his 1845 pamphlet Memoranda relative to a Magnificent Toll-Free Stone Bridge Across the River Severn.... The idea was for a combined railway and carriage road bridge at English Stones, between New Passage in Gloucestershire and Black Rock in Monmouthshire, with 21 arches at least 120 ft above high water, and including shops and a lighthouse. However, the proposal was not well received. Rogers also proposed, in 1844, a railway line extending ten thousand miles between London and Canton (now Guangzhou) in China. He wrote on metallurgy, including The Use of a New Flux (1844) and A New System of Gas Making (1847), and on wider scientific and economic issues, including The Advent of the Millennium (1841), A New Theory of Nature (1844), Outline of a System of Commerce (1848), and The Voice of Science (1851).

He was a supporter of Robert Owen, and supported the radical Chartist Henry Vincent at his trial in 1839. In 1848 he spoke at a public meeting in Newport as a Chartist and Socialist, maintaining that wars would continue so long as commercial institutions were based on competition. He continued to work for Bailey until 1857, when he published the influential An Elementary Treatise on Iron Metallurgy. This contained extensive criticisms of the south Wales ironmasters, who had neglected scientific innovations and established a system that exploited the workers in the industry. Rogers proposed radical reforms, including a profit-sharing system, and the setting up of medical and death insurance funds. He also wrote in support of free non-religious education for all, the social and political equality of women, decimal coinage, smokeless fuel, and the protection of forests. Rogers was also known as a keen amateur musician.

=== Later life ===
Rogers was dismissed by Bailey in 1858, but continued to offer his services as a consultant on iron working, and helped set up the South Wales Institute of Engineers. In 1859, he published proposals for developing heavy industry at the mouth of the River Usk in Newport. The following year, after the deaths of 162 coal miners at the Black Vein pit at Risca, he again proposed the setting up of a benevolent fund largely funded by the mine owners.

In later years Rogers lived in Newport, in "the deepest poverty" and suffering from poor health. Crawshay Bailey rejected suggestions that he should help Rogers, and his only financial support came as a result of an appeal in the Mining Journal. However, he died shortly afterwards, in 1863, at the age of 85. He was buried in an unmarked grave at Llanfoist.

=== Recognition ===
By 1879, Rogers' work was recognised by Edward Williams, President of the Iron and Steel Institute, who described Rogers as "a man of great ability... [but] certainly very eccentric....". Williams described the invention of the iron-bottomed puddling furnace as "the greatest advantage to the manufacture of iron between the day of Cort and Bessemer. For all this Rogers got little or no reward, except local celebrity of small worth, and a nickname...". One later biographical summary of Rogers commented: "Much of the little written about [Rogers] implies that he was completely crazy. Though singularly odd, he was variously gifted and original, gentle-hearted, and fearless in the many causes he championed..."..

There is a road named in his honour, Samuel Rodgers [sic] Crescent, in recent housing development at Thornwell, Chepstow.

== Bibliography ==
- An Elementary Treatise on Iron Metallurgy, 1857
