= Bluecap =

Mythical fairy or ghost

Creature information
- Grouping: Mythological creature Fairy

Origin
- First attested: In folklore
- Country: United Kingdom
- Region: England
- Details: Mines

A bluecap is a mythical fairy or ghost in English folklore that inhabits mines and appears as a small blue flame. If miners treat them with respect, the bluecaps lead them to rich deposits of minerals. Like knockers or kobolds, bluecaps can also forewarn miners of cave-ins. They are mostly associated with the Anglo-Scottish borders.

Bluecaps were regarded as hard workers and it was said that they were expected to be paid a working man's wages, equal to those of an average putter (a mine worker who pushes the wagons). This payment was left in a solitary corner of the mine, and they would not accept any more or less than they were owed. The miners would sometimes talk of having seen a flickering bluecap settle on a full tub of coal, transporting it as though "impelled by the sturdiest sinews".

Another being of the same type (though less helpful in nature) was called "Cutty Soames" or Old Cutty Soames, who was known to cut the rope-traces or soams by which the assistant putter was yoked to the tub.

== See also ==
- Brownie
- Coblynau
- Cofgod
- Hob
- Muki
- Redcap
