= Knocker (folklore) =

Mythical creature in Welsh, Cornish and Devon folklore

Creature information
- Other name(s): Knacker; Tommyknocker
- Grouping: Mythological creature Fairy; Sprite

Origin
- First attested: In folklore
- Country: Britain
- Region: Cornwall and Devon
- Details: Mines

The Knocker, Knacker, or Tommyknocker (US) is a mythical, subterranean, gnome-like creature in Cornish and Devon folklore. The Welsh counterpart is the coblyn. It is closely related to the Irish leprechaun, Kentish kloker and the English and Scottish brownie. The Cornish describe the creature as a little person 2 ft 0 in (0.61 m) tall, with a disproportionately large head, long arms, wrinkled skin, and white whiskers. It wears a tiny version of standard miner's garb and commits random mischief, such as stealing miners' unattended tools and food.

== Cornish folklore ==
Cornish miners believed that the diminutive Knockers beckoned them toward finding rich veins of tin. As miners changed from independent, family-owned operators to hired laborers for large industrialized companies, there was an increased concern for safety, reflected in the knockers' new role. They knocked on the mine walls to warn of impending collapse.

Generally considered benevolent, they were also tricksters who would hide tools and extinguish candles. They are similar to the coblynau of Welsh miners.

One interpretation holds that they are mine-spirits, believed to be the ghosts of the Jews who worked the mines in the 11th and 12th centuries; another view is that they are the spirits of those killed in a mine. To show appreciation, and to avoid future peril, the miners cast the last bite of their tasty pasties into the mines for the Knockers.

== In the United States ==
In the 1820s, immigrant Welsh and Cornish miners brought tales of the Tommyknockers and their theft of unwatched items and warning knocks to western Pennsylvania. Cornish miners, much sought after in the years following the gold and silver rushes, brought them to Colorado, Nevada, and California. The underground elves became part of the folklore of miners throughout the American West, not just those of Cornish background.

When asked if they had relatives who would come to work the mines, the Cornish miners always said something along the lines of "Well, me cousin Jack over in Cornwall wouldst come, could ye pay 'is boat ride", and so these immigrant miners came to be called Cousin Jacks. The Cousin Jacks refused to enter new mines until assured by the management that the knockers were already on duty. Even non-Cornish miners, who worked deep in the earth where the noisy support timbers creaked and groaned, came to respect the Tommyknockers. The American interpretation of knockers seemed to be more ghostly than elfish.

Belief in the knockers in America remained well into the 20th century. When one large mine closed in 1956 and the owners sealed the entrance, fourth, fifth, and sixth generation Cousin Jacks circulated a petition calling on the mineowners to set the knockers free so that they could move on to other mines. The owners complied. Belief among Nevadan miners persisted amongst its miners as late as the 1930s.

Tommyknocker Brewery in Idaho Springs, Colorado owes its namesake to the mythical creature, and began serving in 1994.

Knocker also appeared as a name for the same phenomena, in the folklore of Staffordshire miners.

== In literature ==
- Knockers are a motif found in the science fiction/horror book The Tommyknockers by Stephen King.
- Tommyknockers are also mentioned in the Hardy Boys book, Hunting for Hidden Gold. "Tommy-clockers" is the title of chapter eight.
- A benevolent knocker appears in The Ironwood Tree, the fourth book in The Spiderwick Chronicles, in which it helps the protagonists escape from a dwarf kingdom.
- In the Pulitzer Prize-winning novel Angle of Repose by Wallace Stegner, protagonist Susan Burling Ward first hears about tommyknockers when her husband and his colleagues take her into one of the quicksilver mines at New Almaden.
- In The Fifth Elephant by Terry Pratchett, the protagonist learns about "knockermen," dwarves whose jobs are to prevent explosions of firedamp in dwarf mines. The book notes that the knockermen would hear knockers while at their duties. In that book and subsequent ones in the Discworld series, high status dwarves are often retired knockermen.

== See also ==
- Bluecap
- Bucca
- Coblynau
- Kobold
- Gnome
- Gremlin
- Pisky
- Púca
- Nocker, a kith in the White Wolf RPG Changeling: the Dreaming
- Cornish emigration
- Mining in Cornwall and Devon
- Peter and the Piskies: Cornish Folk and Fairy Tales
