= Púca =

Mythological creature

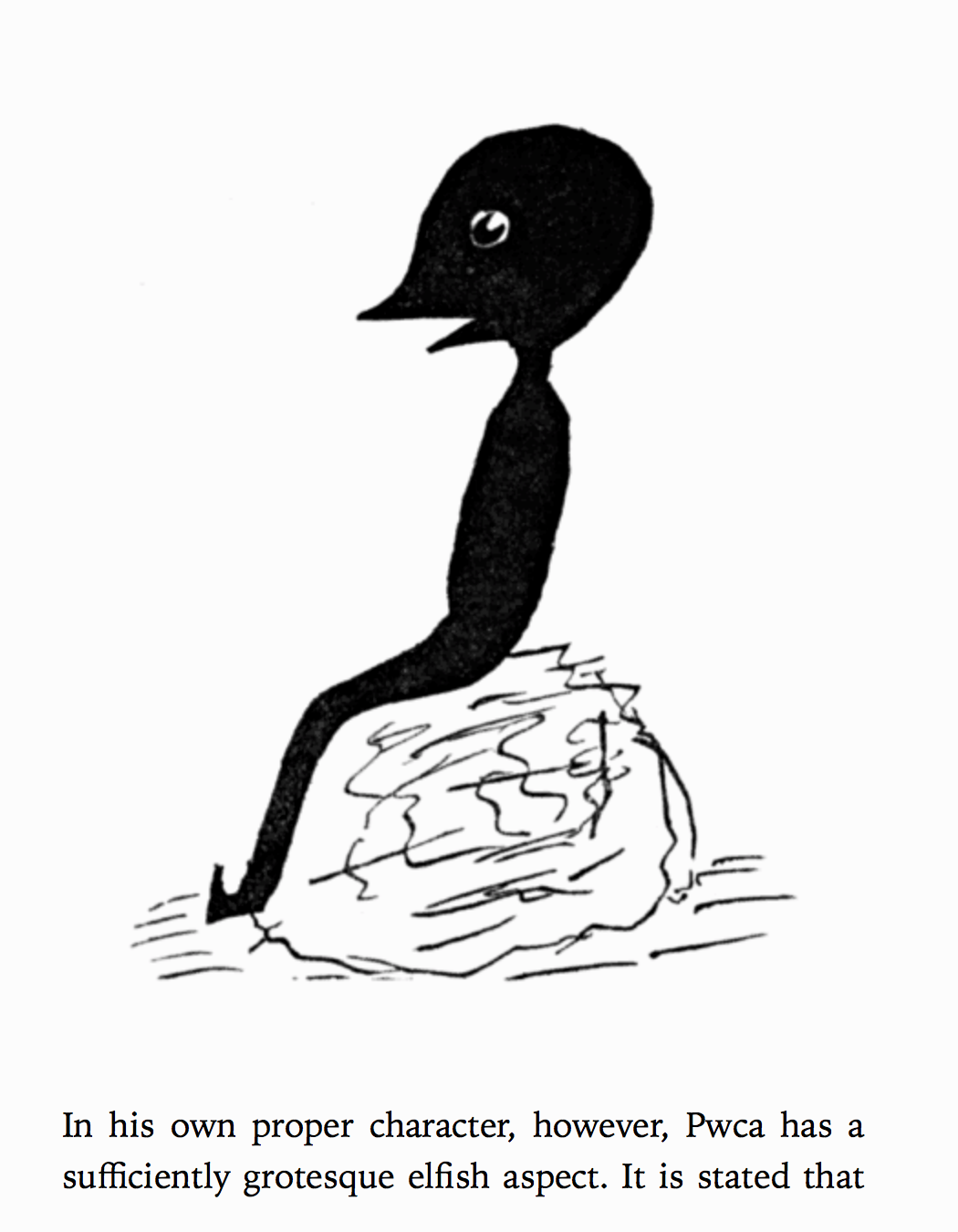
Depiction of the Pwca in Wirt Sikes's book British Goblins: Welsh Folk-lore, Fairy Mythology, Legends and Traditions, 1880

The púca (Irish for spirit/ghost; plural púcaí), puca (Old English for goblin), also pwca, pooka, pookah, phouka, and puck, is a creature of Celtic, English, and Channel Islands folklore. Considered to be bringers both of good and bad fortune, they could help or hinder rural and marine communities. Púcaí can have dark or white fur or hair. The creatures were said to be shape-changers that could take the appearance of horses, goats, cats, dogs, and hares. They may also take a human disguise, which includes various animal features, such as animal ears or a tail.

== Etymology and analogues ==
The Irish word púca is of English origin, the etymon being Middle English puck.

The púca has counterparts throughout the Celtic and Germanic cultures of Northwest Europe. For instance, in Scandinavian languages, we find, according to the OED, "Old Icelandic púki mischievous demon, the Devil, Faroese púki, Norwegian (originally and chiefly regional) puke devil, evil spirit, mischievous person, Old Swedish puke devil, evil spirit, Swedish (now chiefly regional) puke evil spirit, devil, goblin), Old Danish puge evil spirit". In Welsh mythology, it is named the pwca and in Cornish the bucca (thus being related in etymology and milieu to the bugaboo). In the Channel Islands, the pouque were said to be fairies who lived near ancient stones; in Norman French of the islands (e.g. Jèrriais), a cromlech, or prehistoric tomb, is referred to as a pouquelée or pouquelay(e); poulpiquet and polpegan are corresponding terms in Brittany.

== Nature of the púca ==
The púca may be regarded as being either menacing or beneficial. Fairy mythologist Thomas Keightley said "notions respecting it are very vague", and in a brief description gives an account collected by Croker from a boy living near Killarney that "old people used to say that the Pookas were very numerous ... long ago ... , were wicked-minded, black-looking, bad things ... that would come in the form of wild colts, with chains hanging about them", and that did much to harm unwary travellers. Also, little bad boys and girls were warned not to eat overripe blackberries, because this was a sign that the pooka has entered them.

One theme of the púca's folklore is their proclivity for mischief. They are commonly said to entice humans to take a ride on their back, giving the rider a wild and terrifying journey before dropping the unlucky person back at the place they were taken from. This lore bears similarities to other Irish folk creatures, such as the daoine maithe (good people) or the slua sí (fairy host), said to target humans on the road or along their regular "passes". These human encounters of the púca tend to occur in rural, isolated places, far from settlements or homes.

While púca stories can be found across northern Europe, Irish tales specify a protective measure for encountering a púca. It is said that the rider may be able to take control of the púca by wearing sharp spurs, using those to prevent being taken or to steer the creature if already on its back.

A translation of an Irish púca story, "An Buachaill Bó agus an Púca", told by storyteller Seán Ó Cróinín, describes this method of control of the púca as done by a young boy who had been the creature's target once before:

... the farmer asked the lad what had kept him out so late. The lad told him.

"I have spurs," said the farmer. "Put them on you tonight and if he brings you give him the spurs!" And this the lad did. The thing threw him from its back and the lad got back early enough. Within a week the (pooka) was before him again after housing the cows.

"Come to me," said the lad, "so I can get up on your back."

"Have you the sharp things on?" said the animal.

"Certainly," said the lad.

"Oh I won't go near you, then," he said.

The protective power of the "sharp things", as they are always referred to by the pooka in the tales, may stem from the Irish belief that "cold iron" has the ability to ward off the supernatural.

In contrast, the púca is represented as being helpful to farmers by Lady Wilde, who relates the following tale. A farmer's son named Padraig one day noticed the invisible presence of the púca brushing by, and called out to him, offering a coat. The púca appeared in the guise of a young bull, and told him to come to the old mill at night. From that time onward, the púca came secretly at night and performed all the work of milling the sacks of corn into flour. Padraig fell asleep the first time, but later concealed himself in a chest to catch sight of them, and later made a present of a fine silk suit. This unexpectedly caused the púca to go off to "see a little of the world" and cease its work. But by then the farmer's wealth allowed him to retire and give his son an education. Later, at Padraig's wedding, the púca left a gift of a golden cup filled with drink that evidently ensured their happiness. (Note: The contrast between Croker's and Wilde's notions is taken from MacKillop 1998 under "pooka", except mention could not be found in Croker's body of works as MacKillop states, but only via Keightley.)

Another example of the púca as a benevolent or protective entity comes in tales where the creature intervenes before a terrible accident or before the person is about to happen upon a malevolent fairy or spirit. In several of the regional variants of the stories where the púca is acting as a guardian, the púca identifies itself to the bewildered human. This is particularly noteworthy as it is in contrast to the lore of many other folkloric beings, who guard their identities or names from humans.

== Morphology and physiology ==
According to legend, the púca is a deft shapeshifter, capable of assuming a variety of terrifying or pleasing forms. It can take a human form, but will often have animal features, such as ears or a tail. As an animal, the púca will most commonly appear as a horse, cat, rabbit, raven, fox, wolf, goat, goblin, or dog. No matter what shape the púca takes, its fur is almost always dark. It most commonly takes the form of a sleek black horse with a flowing mane and luminescent golden eyes. The Manx glashtyn also takes on human form, but he usually betrays his horse's ears and is analogous to the each uisce.

If a human is enticed onto a púca's back, it has been known to give them a wild ride; however, unlike a kelpie, which will take its rider and dive into the nearest stream or lake to drown and devour them, the púca will do its rider no real harm. However, according to some folklorists, the only man ever to ride the púca was Brian Boru, High King of Ireland, by using a special bridle incorporating three hairs of the púca's tail. The púca has the power of human speech, and has been known to give advice and lead people away from harm. Though the púca enjoys confusing and often terrifying humans, it is considered to be benevolent.

== Agricultural traditions ==
Certain agricultural traditions surround the púca. It is a creature associated with Samhain, a Goidelic harvest festival, when the last of the crops are brought in. Anything remaining in the fields is considered "puka", or fairy-blasted, and hence inedible. In some locales, reapers leave a small share of the crop, the "púca's share", to placate the hungry creature. Nonetheless, 1 November is the púca's day, and the one day of the year when it can be expected to behave civilly.

At the beginning of November, the púca was known—in some locales—to either defecate or spit on the wild fruits rendering them inedible and unsafe thenceforth.

== Regional variations ==
In some regions, the púca is spoken of with considerably more respect than fear; if treated with deference, it may actually be beneficial to those who encounter it. The púca is a creature of the mountains and hills, and in those regions there are stories of it appearing on November Day and providing prophecies and warnings to those who consult it.

In some parts of County Down, the púca is manifested as a short, disfigured goblin who demands a share of the harvest; in County Laois, it appears as a monstrous bogeyman, while in Waterford and Wexford the púca appears as an eagle with a huge wingspan and in Roscommon as a black goat.

== Art and popular culture ==
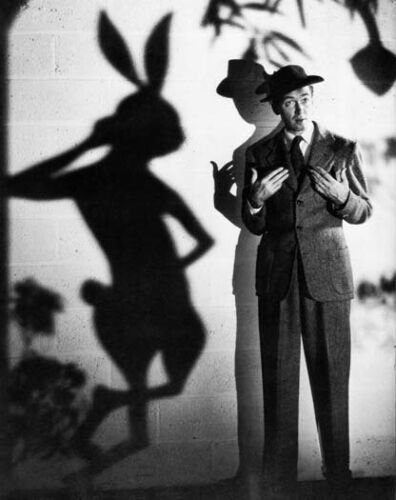
Elwood P. Dowd and the shadow of a púca, characters in the 1950 film Harvey

William Shakespeare's 1595 play A Midsummer Night's Dream features the character "Robin Goodfellow," who is also called "sweet Puck," a version of the púca.

The title character in the 1944 stage play Harvey – twice adapted into a 1950 film starring James Stewart and then as a 1996 film starring Harry Anderson and Leslie Nielsen – is an invisible six-foot, three-and-a-half-inch (1.92 m) tall anthropomorphic rabbit, who is referred to as a "pooka".

In the 1959 Disney film Darby O'Gill and the Little People, Darby believes (possibly correctly) that his horse is actually a púca.

In Emma Bull's 1987 debut novel, War for the Oaks, a phooka is the appointed protector of the protagonist, who's been caught in a war between different factions of the faerie realm.

Púcai (or "pookas") appear as regular atmospheric threats in children's game show Knightmare (1987 - 1994). They appear as green, floating ghost-like creatures with characteristic prominent cheeks and plants for hair.

In the tabletop role-play game Changeling: The Dreaming (originally published by White Wolf Publishing in July 1995), a Pooka is one of the standard playable kiths (fairy species). They are described as lighthearted liars and tricksters who can shapeshift into a specific animal.

In The Spiderwick Chronicles, the Phooka is a shapeshifting trickster resembling a cross between a monkey, a cat, and a rabbit, covered with dark fur and has a pair of insect wings.

In the 2012 short film Mike and Melissa, Mike is visited by an anthropomorphic purple skunk, who describes herself as either a Púca or a construct of Mike's imagination.

In the book Knock Knock Open Wide by Neil Sharpson, Puckeen is a children's show and also the name of a mysterious, magical creature who lives in a black box and is never actually shown, only spoken of. In discussions of the book Sharpson has said that the Puckeen was inspired by tales of the púca.

The 2018 animated series Hilda and the graphic novel series it is based on feature the Pooka. It appears in the third season and is a greedy character who often stops at the home of a relative of the main character to "borrow things".

There is a statue of a púca in Ireland. The 2-meter tall bronze sculpture was erected in the Burren at the Michael Cusack Centre in Carron, Co. Clare in 2022.

== See also ==
- Puck in English folklore
- Torngarsuk
- Yaoguai
- Yekyua
