= Tommyknocker Brewery =

Tommyknocker Brewery is a craft brewery and brewpub in Idaho Springs, Colorado and Helsinki, Finland. They produce a line of beers and craft sodas, including root beer, made with distinctive ingredients such as mountain cherry, mountain maple and valerian root. Tommyknockers distributes their products across the United States and Canada.

== History ==
Tommyknocker Brewing was established 1994, and has since continuously produced a variety of soft drinks including sodas (root beer), bottled water, and beers. Today, their two highest-selling products are their beers and root beer.

During the Colorado gold rush of 1859, Idaho Springs became a popular location for mining, and the Tommyknocker Brewing Company was established to meet the needs of the large number of prospectors. The town today is home to 1,800 people, with the brewery conducting business nationwide.

== Availability ==
Tommyknocker products are sold in select stores in the United States, Finland, and Canada, as well as online from the company website.

== Old Tommyknocker ==
The company name comes from the tommyknocker, a mythical elf-like creature who was said to live in the cracks of mines. Some of miners said that they could hear the tommyknockers singing and working deep in the dark mine shafts and cracks within the walls. Two legends of the tommyknocker were brought to the United States by immigrants from Cornwall, England. One kind was mischievous, who dumped out the miners' lunches, blew out their candles, and hid their picks and axes on them. The other kind were friendly and were said to knock on the walls of the mines to show where the richest deposits of gold were.

== Achievements ==
Tommyknocker root beer has a distinct flavor in comparison to other root beers, attributable to the unique ingredients used in its creation, including mountain cherry, mountain maple, valerian root, fenugreek, St. John's wort, melissa, birch, licorice root, hops extract, malt extract, and maple syrup.

Tommyknocker has won numerous awards in their beer, and their root beer has also won various prizes from around the nation in contests, and beverage studies.

== The Showdown ==
On March 18, 2001, six researchers tested, tasted, and compared seven different types of root beer that were produced all throughout the nation, such as IBC Root Beer, Barq's and Tommyknocker. Tommyknocker was judged to have an average taste, however, they graded the root beer 2.67 points in the first round. The other root beers in the showoff were rated: Faygo (3.24), Pirate's Keg (2.93), Stewart's (2.90), Dad's (2.74), Big Shooter / Dog-n-Suds / Virgil's (2.67), and Route 66 (2.17), and Natural Brew (2.10). With a score of 2.67, Tommyknocker finished in fourth place out of eight.
