= Aberystruth =

Ancient parish in Monmouthshire, Wales

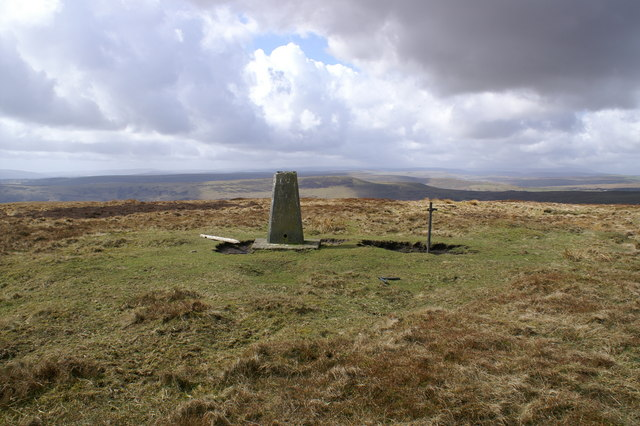
Aberystruth The summit of Mynydd Carn-y-cefn one kilometre west of Blaina looking west

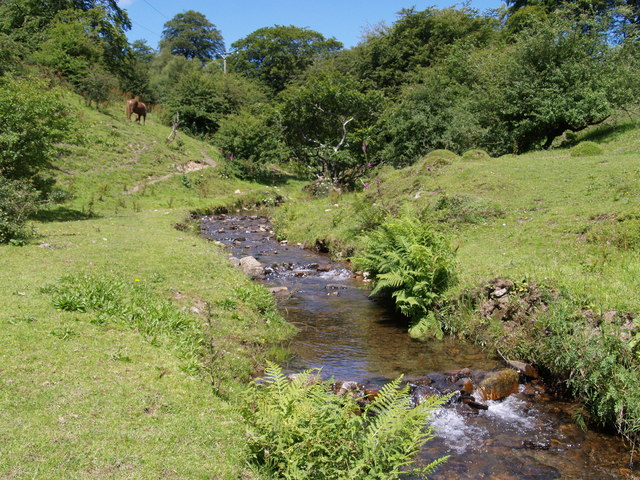
Nant Ystruth Cwm-celyn, Blaina

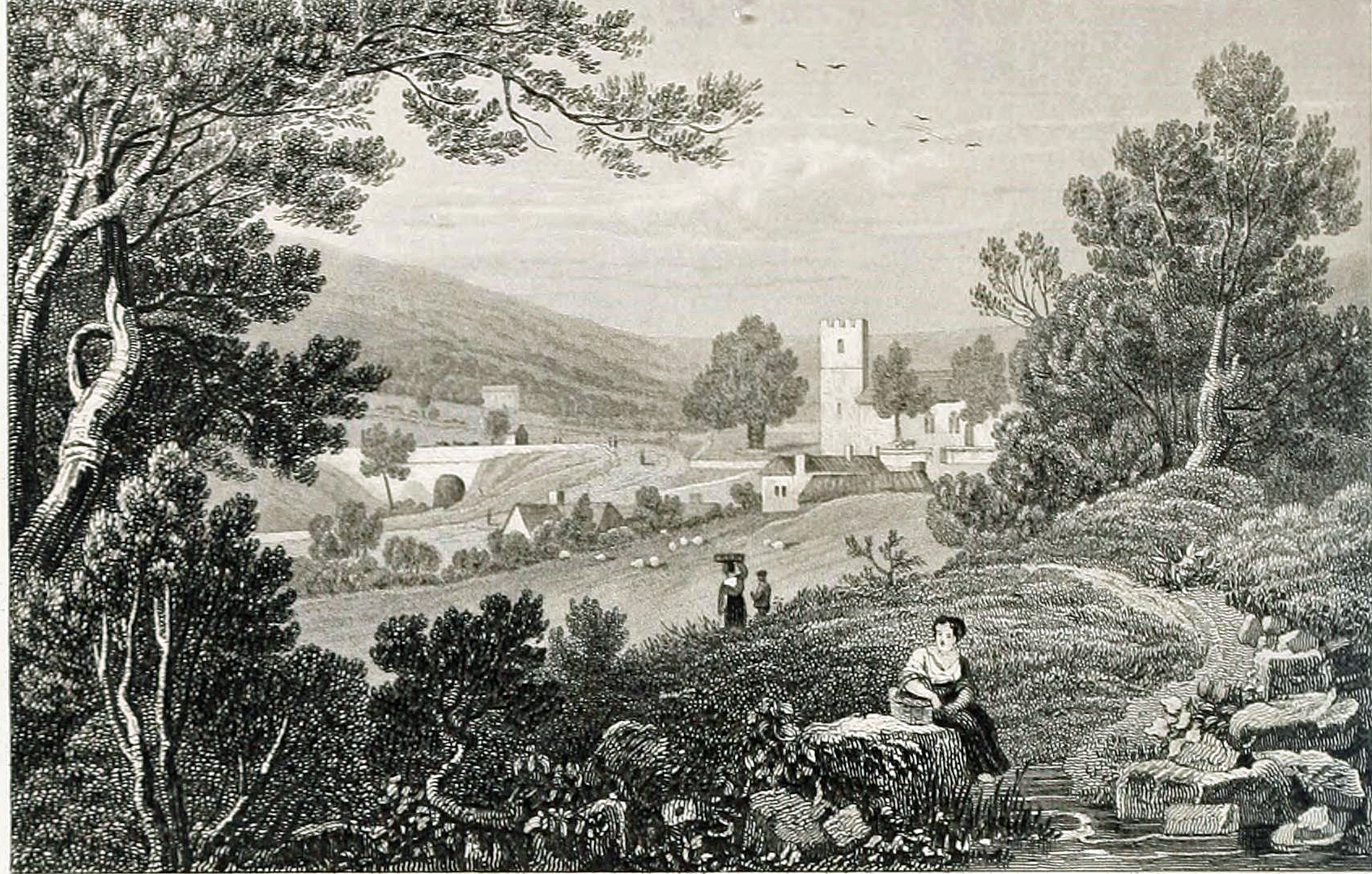
St Peter's, Blaina, 1820. steel engraving from a drawing by Henry Gastineau "Towards the extremity of the vale, cross the Ebwy vach, over another stone-bridge, to the church, situated in the midst of fields, upon a gentle rise overhanging the torrent. In this track, pass the Ystruth, a lively rill, which descends from a wooded dingle, and in a few paces falls into the Ebwyfach. This stream gives the name of Aberystruth to the scattered village, which is likewise called Blaenaugwent. The church is a handsome building, in the pointed or Norman style, with a square tower. The inside consists of a nave and north aisle, separated by five arches. As there is no chancel, the communion table is placed in a small recess at the extremity of the nave; over it is a whimsical group, carved in wood, and painted; two angels are represented sounding brazen trumpets, and between them a clergyman in his robes, holding an enormous trumpet in his hand. The service is performed in Welsh, the English language being little understood. The church-yard contains eleven old yews; the largest is twenty-four feet in circumference, the smallest eleven and a half. The natives wear flannel shirts, some white and others red. In ascending the northern extremity of this delightful' vale, gradually advance into a wild, dreary, and almost uninhabited district, among bleak hills and barren moors."

Aberystruth was an ancient ecclesiastical parish in Wales, located beside the north-west corner of the county of Monmouthshire against the border with Brecknockshire and between the parishes of Bedwellty and Trevethin. It extended from Beaufort in the north beyond Abertillery in the south.

== Blaina ==
The parish church located near the centre of the parish in the village of Blaina and dedicated to St Peter, was first built about the year 1500 and that building lasted more than 320 years.

Following a fire which destroyed the original St Peter's another church was built on the site, the opening services being held on 4 December 1856; this was demolished in 1966. The present St Peter's Blaina dates from the late 1960s and today forms part of a larger ministry area served by clergy headed by the Rector of Ebbw Vale.

Aberystruth remained the official ecclesiastical name of the parish into the 1980s. Clergy were styled Rector of Aberystruth (Blaina) in Crockford's Clerical Directory but it had been obsolete in all other usages for decades. An attempt in recent years to restore the name for a ministry area which would have linked the Abertillery and Blaina parishes under one heading did not, in the end, succeed.

== Industry ==
Development of Aberystruth's coal and iron ore deposits in the early nineteenth century brought explosive growth to Abertillery and Nantyglo and its new suburb of Brynmawr.

Aberystruth is now the eastern portion of the county borough of Blaenau Gwent

== Parish bounds and Brynmawr ==
The 19th century settlement of Brynmawr spanned the original boundary of Monmouthshire (parish of Aberystruth) and Brecknockshire (parishes of Llanelly and Llangattock). At the southern end of Boundary Street Brynmawr you may still find the Boundary Stone marking the point where the three parishes met.
