= Magid (Jewish mysticism) =

Magid (or Maggid) is used in Kabbalah to describe the Jewish communication with God, whereby an angel or the soul of a saint who died, reveals a living mystical experience, via a dream or a daydream, usually resulting from using magical means. A Magid Torah reveals a person, usually through the Kabbalah, that tells one about future events.

== See also ==
- Jewish mysticism
- Psychoanalysis
