= Peter Roberts (priest) =

Welsh antiquarian and Anglican clergyman (1760–1819)

The Reverend Peter Roberts
- Rector of Halkin, Flintshire
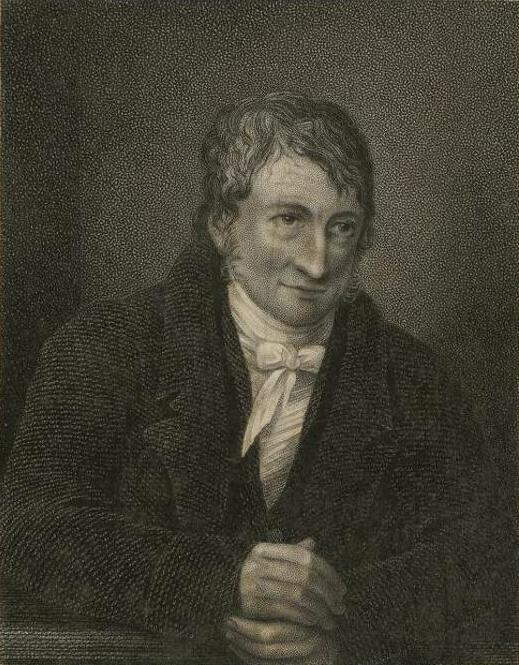
- Engraved portrait (1821)

Personal details
- Born: c. 1760
- Died: 1819 (aged ~59)
- Denomination: Anglican
- Education: Trinity College Dublin

Peter Roberts (c. 1760–1819) was a Welsh Anglican divine and antiquary. He graduated MA at Dublin, was ordained, and held successively several livings. His chief works were Sketch of the Early History of the Cymry, 1803, and Cambrian Popular Antiquities, 1815.

== Life ==
Peter Roberts, son of John Roberts, was born about 1760 at Tai'n y Nant, Ruabon, Denbighshire. His father, a clockmaker, moved in a few years after his birth to Wrexham, where Roberts was educated at the grammar school, then under Edward Davies. When about fifteen he entered St. Asaph grammar school as pupil assistant to Peter Williams. Through the Irish pupils in the school he became known to Henry Ussher, afterwards professor of astronomy at Trinity College Dublin, who procured him admission as a sizar to that university.

Having graduated MA, he remained in Dublin as a private tutor, studying especially oriental languages and astronomy. His proficiency in the latter subject gave him some hope of succeeding his friend and patron, Ussher; but the appointment of John Brinkley in 1792 led to his devoting himself to the career of a family tutor, an occupation he followed for many years. Two of his pupils, Lords Lanesborough and Bolton, in course of time assigned him a pension, which enabled him to give all his time to study.

In 1811 Bishop Cleaver gave him the rectory of Llanarmon Dyffryn Ceiriog, and in 1814 he was presented by Lord Crewe to the vicarage of Madeley, Shropshire. In December 1818 he exchanged Llanarmon for the rectory of Halkin, Flintshire, but soon after settling there died of apoplexy on either 21 or 30 May 1819. His monument in the church styles him in legibus, moribus, institutis, annalibus, poesi, musica gentis Cambro-Britannicæ instructissimus ('most instructed in the laws, manners, institutions, annals, poetry, and music of the Welsh-British race').

== Works ==
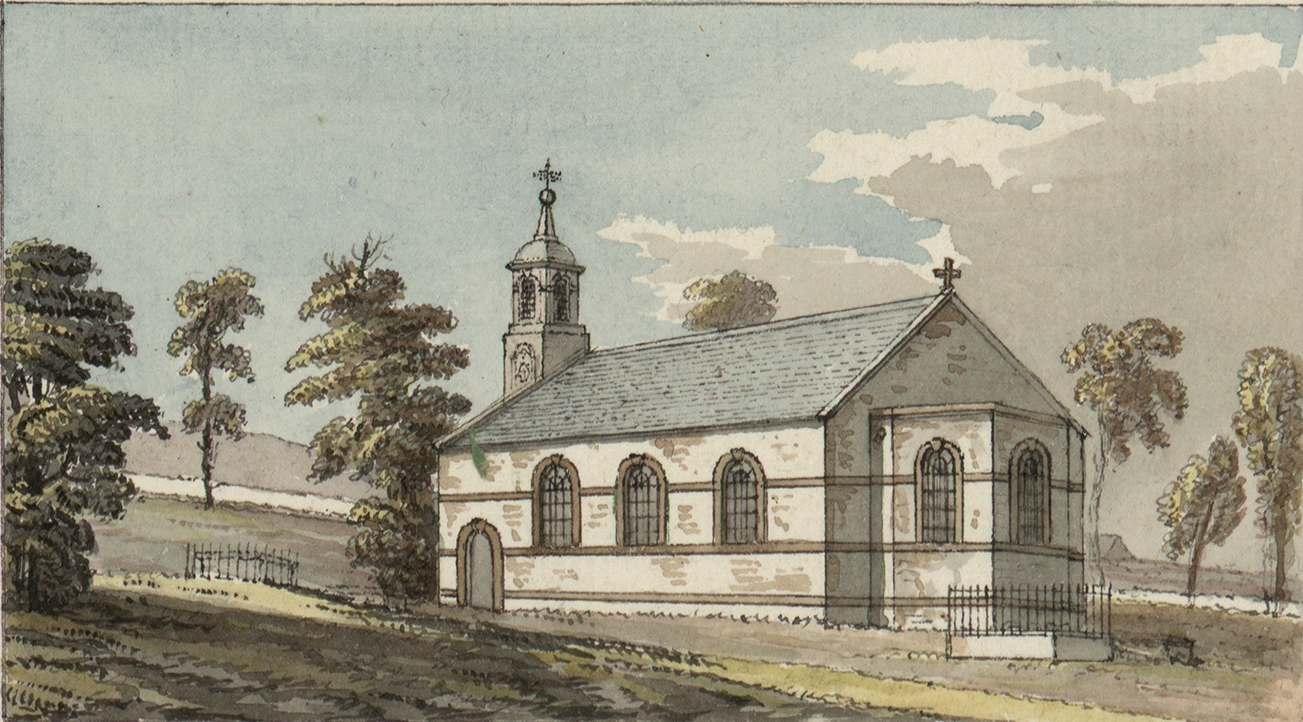
View of the old Church of St. Mary the Virgin, Halkin, printed in Pennant's A Tour in Wales (2nd ed., 1781)

His chief works were:

1. Harmony of the Epistles, published by the Cambridge University Press, 1800.
2. Christianity Vindicated (in answer to Volney's Ruins), 1800.
3. Sketch of the Early History of the Cymry, London, 1803.
4. Chronicle of the Kings of Britain, a translation of one of the Welsh versions of Geoffrey of Monmouth, with illustrative dissertations, London, 1811.
5. Cambrian Popular Antiquities, London, 1815.
6. History of Oswestry, published anonymously in 1815.

Other works were published by him on the origin of constellations, the art of correspondence, prophecy, and the church of Rome. According to the Dictionary of National Biography, Roberts was a scholar of wide reading but inferior judgment and the Cambrian Popular Antiquities, dealing with Welsh rustic customs and superstitions, is his most valuable contribution to letters.

== Sources ==
- Jenkins, Thomas Robert (1959). "Roberts, Peter (1760–1819), cleric, Biblical scholar and antiquary". Dictionary of Welsh Biography. UWP. Retrieved 10 September 2022.
- Lloyd, J. E.; Smith, Robert V. (2004). "Roberts, Peter (1760–1819), Church of England clergyman and antiquary". Oxford Dictionary of National Biography. OUP. Retrieved 10 September 2022.
- Parry, John H. (1824). The Cambrian Plutarch: Comprising Memoirs of Some of the Most Eminent Welshmen. London: W. Simpkin and R. Marshall. pp. 376–385.

Attribution:

- This article incorporates text from a publication now in the public domain: Lloyd, John Edward (1896). "Roberts, Peter". In Lee, Sidney (ed.). Dictionary of National Biography. Vol. 48. London: Smith, Elder & Co. pp. 389–390.
