= Church of St Mary the Virgin, Halkyn =

Coordinates: 53.2316°N 3.1862°W

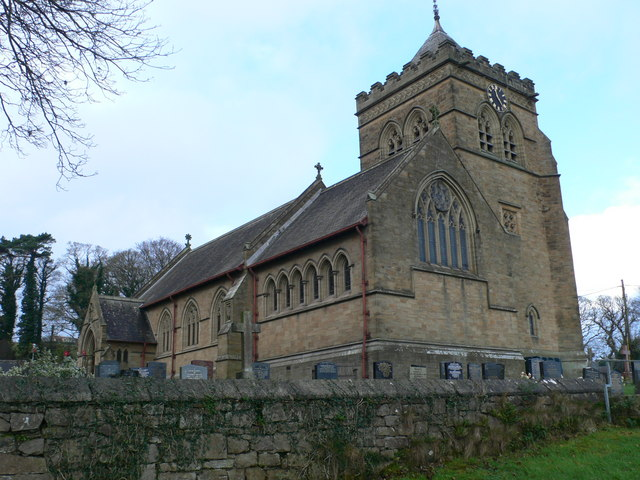
- Church of St Mary the Virgin, Halkyn, from the northeast
- Church of St Mary the Virgin, Halkyn
- OS grid reference: SJ 209 711
- Location: Halkyn, Flintshire
- Country: Wales
- Denomination: Anglican

History
- Status: Parish church
- Dedication: Mary the Virgin
- Consecrated: 29 October 1878

Architecture
- Functional status: Active
- Heritage designation: Grade I
- Designated: 24 February 1983
- Architect: John Douglas
- Architectural type: Church
- Style: Gothic Revival
- Groundbreaking: 1877
- Completed: 1878

Administration
- Province: Wales
- Diocese: St Asaph

The Church of St Mary the Virgin, Halkyn is to the north of the village of Halkyn, Flintshire, Wales. It is an active Anglican parish church in the diocese of St Asaph. The church is designated by Cadw as a Grade I listed building.

== History ==
A church has been present in Halkyn for at least 1,000 years. However the present church dates only from 1878 when the old church was demolished and a new church was built on a different site. It was designed by the Chester architect John Douglas and paid for by the 1st Duke of Westminster.

== Architecture and contents ==
The plan of the church consists of a chancel, a four-bay nave with a north aisle, a south porch and a tower at the northeast corner. Its architectural style is Gothic Revival with a mixture of Early English and Decorated. It is built in stone which is ashlar both externally and internally.

The internal furnishings are in detailed joinery which were designed by Douglas. The windows contain a compete set of stained glass by Heaton, Butler and Bayne. Within a south buttress is a crucifixion panel which was formerly part of a 14th-century churchyard cross.

Hubbard considers it to be "one of the best Victorian churches in Clwyd". which "sets the tone for virtually all his [Douglas'] subsequent churches".

== See also ==
- List of new churches by John Douglas
