= John Evans (topographical writer) =

John Evans (1768 – c.1812) was a writer, noted for his description of Wales.

== Life and works ==
Evans was born in 1768 and studied at the University of Oxford, matriculating as a member of Jesus College in 1789 and obtaining a Bachelor of Arts degree in 1792. He wrote about Wales in four publications, although the details they contain is more based upon material that Evans had read than upon any personal observation by Evans. His works are:

- A Tour through part of North Wales in … 1798 and at other times: principally undertaken with a view to Botanical researches in that alpine country; interspersed with observations on its Scenery, Agriculture, Manufactures (1800; further editions in 1802 and 1804)
- Letters written during a Tour through South Wales in … 1803 and at other times (1804)
- Monmouthshire (in volume 11 of The Beauties of England and Wales, 1810)
- North Wales (volume 17 of The Beauties of England and Wales, 1812)

He died in about 1812, before he finished writing about south Wales.
