= Yekyua =

A Yekyua or "mother animal" is a class of Yakut spirits that remain hidden until the snow melts in the Spring. The Yakuts are a Turkic people.

Each yekyua is associated with a particular animal. They act as familiar spirits to protect Yakut shamans. They are dangerous and powerful. The most dangerous are attached to female shamans. The type of animal determines the strength of the yekyua. For example, dog yekyua have little power, while elk yekyua do. Only shaman can see yekyua. When a shaman puts his/her spirit into his yekyua, he/she is dependent on his animal part. If another shaman who has manifested his animal kills the animal of another, the shaman with the dead animal dies. When the yekyua are fighting in the spring, the shaman with which they are associated feel ill. Dog yekyua are not prized as they gnaw at the shaman and destroy his body, bringing him sickness. Ordinarily, a good yekyua protects the shaman.
