= Welsh folklore =

Folklore of the Welsh people

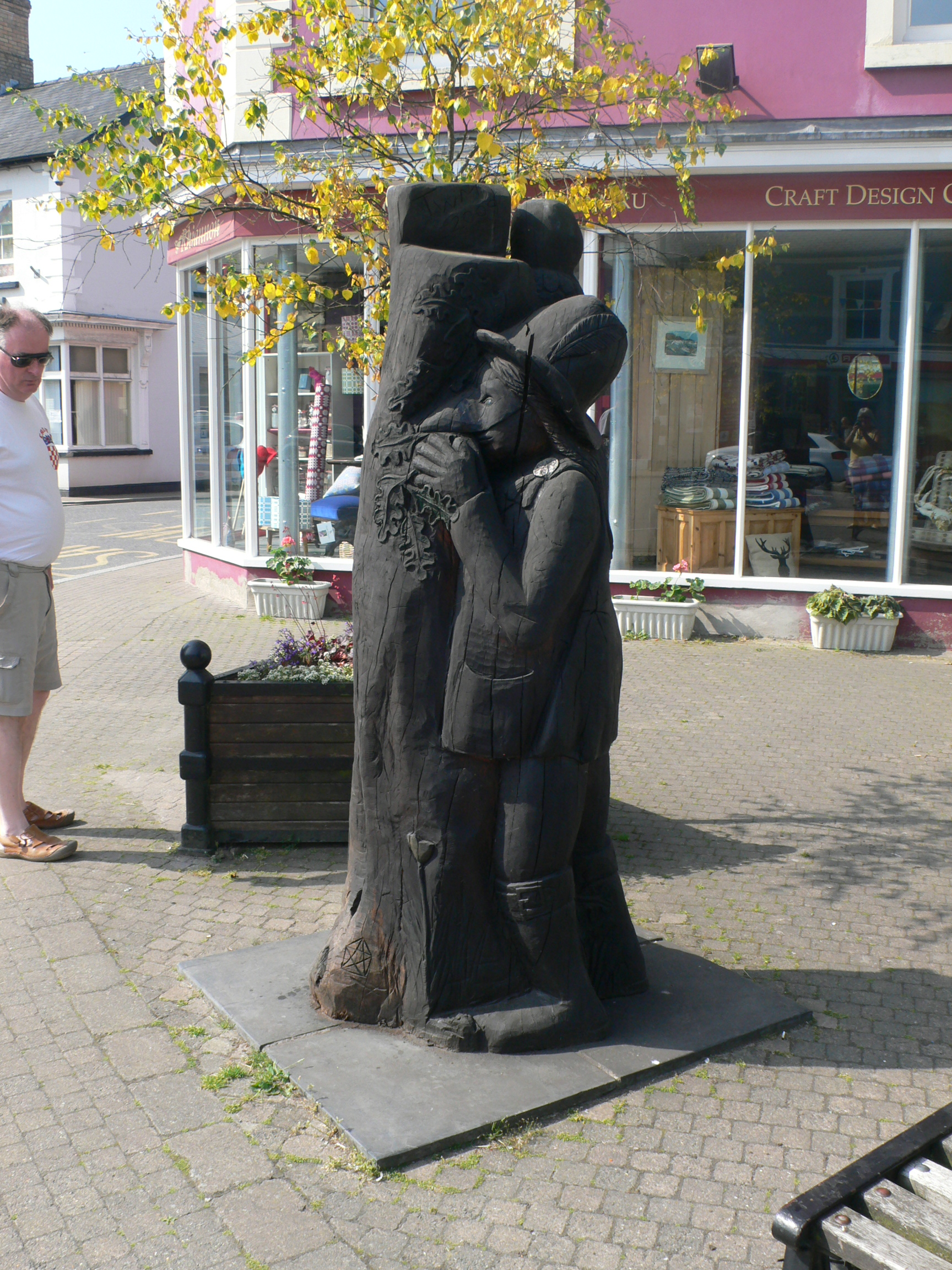
A prominent figure in Welsh folklore, Twm Siôn Cati is the subject of many tales of cunning and trickery, who is also said to have been a respected antiquary, genealogist, poet and to have risen to become a magistrate and mayor of Brecon.

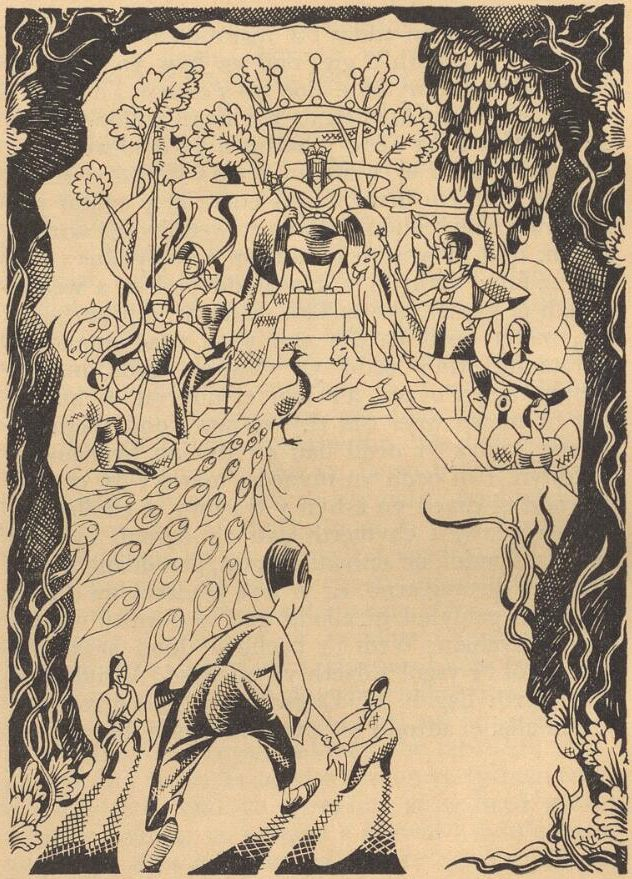
Y Tylwyth Teg illustration

Welsh folklore also known as Llên Gwerin or Llên y Werin (Welsh for 'Folk Literature/Learning') is the collective term for the folklore of the Welsh people. It encompasses topics related to Welsh mythology, folk tales, customs, and oral tradition.

Welsh folklore is related to Irish and Scottish folklore due to its Celtic traditions, as well as English folklore. It also shares similarities with Breton and Cornish folklore due to shared history.

== History ==
=== Medieval ===
There are numerous examples of Welsh folklore throughout Medieval Welsh literature, such as in the Historia Brittonum, Middle Welsh poetry and the Book of Taliesin. However, while there are allusions to Welsh folklore in the works of the "Beirdd yr Uchelwyr" (Poets of the Nobility) 1350 to 1600 it was the cyfarwyddiaid (singular: cyfarwydd, "storyteller"), who were mostly responsible for recording folklore in this period.

The cyfarwyddiaid were members of the bardic order in Wales. The only historical cyfarwydd known by name is Bledri ap Cydifor ('Bledericus Walensis', 'Bleherus'). The cyfawyddiaid were considered a learned class with duties and an education that exceeded that of a common poet. They were court officials with extensive training in their art, and often had a close relationship with their lord. Their duties extended to the traditions involved in praising, celebrating and mourning their lord. Welsh folklore includes a number of tales that were preserved and told by the cyfarwyddiaid, who were also tasked with conserving the traditional historical material, the accepted myth of the Welsh past, and sharing the corresponding stories, being considered as historians themselves. Besides storytelling, the cyfarwyddiaid also had the task of protecting the genealogies of the powerful families.

The tales of Welsh lore were shared as proverbs and songs, in addition to simple spoken stories. The historical tales were told along with the non-historical fables, without significant distinction. This allowed culture and history to be explored and taught through the poetics of the time. In earlier periods, the penceirddiaid are believed to have narrated stories in the courts of princes and nobles. Later, the stories were told by the cyfarwyddiaid for audiences other than nobility.

The writing of medieval folklore had adopted and explored a set of rules and themes. It relied on the poetic triads of the time, poetics, old verse and knowledge of histories, which enabled the conception of well-crafted stories about the historical truths of the population. Additionally, regions would adopt their own guidelines in storymaking, such as the Triads of the Island of Britain, which led tales to be based on mythological, historical and heroic themes. The writing also followed structure, having a chronological series of events in short episodes, known as features, which reflect the oral origins of the tales for easy story-telling to the audiences.

Welsh folklore was often compared to Irish literature of similar value. They both consisted of similar structure and aimed to inform about the past, rather than to target the mistakes of their ancestry with satire. The form of these tales also mimicked that of early Irish sagas, being prose sprinkled with poetry. Moreover, the conservation of Irish tales was also performed by a class of gentry, much like the cyfarwyddiaid of Wales. However, even with other similar duties, the Irish bards were not story-tellers. That role was saved for the poets in Ireland.

This type of storytelling, in both Ireland and Wales, was believed to have arisen through spiritual inspiration. The poets spoke ‘through’ great knowledge, which was sometimes thought to be acquired only by the practice of divination, a concept known as ái in Irish, and awen in Welsh. The Welsh cyfarwyddiaid were thus considered awenyddion, able to deliver prophetic speech in a possessed state of awen. This is not the only ritual practice that evolved around Welsh folklore, as other customs have originated from the tales themselves.

Folk tales and legends have also survived through retellings by common people. Storytelling could and does occur in many different forms: "gossip, games, dancing, and the reciting of riddles, tongue-twisters, nursery-rhymes, harp-stanzas, folk-songs and ballads." Common occasions for telling folk narratives were the nosweithiau llawen (or "merry evenings," similar to a céilidh), nosweithiau gwau ("knitting nights"), and Calan Gaeaf (Winter's Eve).

=== Early modern period ===
During the fifteenth and sixteenth centuries, a number of laws were passed to suppress Welsh culture. The 1401 and 1402 act, Penal laws against the Welsh forbid any public assembly for Welsh people as well as prohibiting Welsh men (and English men who married Welsh women) from holding senior public office, bearing arms or purchasing property in English boroughs. The laws were reaffirmed throughout the fifteenth century, before being replaced by the Laws in Wales Acts 1535 and 1542. As such, the Welsh-speaking gentry were replaced with a highly anglicised one, who used the English language and English customs. The laws had a substantial impact on Welsh culture, legally limiting both the Welsh language and culture to the lower classes.

Despite the demise of an affluent Welsh class, Wales saw a great number of cultural and educational movements in eighteenth century. As "the decay or demise of an ancient way of life" was matched by an unprecedented level of activity which worked to preserve or develop Welsh culture and an interest in all things Welsh, regardless of social status.

=== Nineteenth century ===
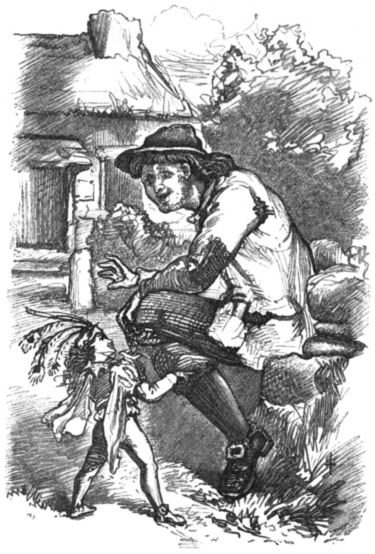
Rowli and the Ellyll, an image from British Goblins Welsh folk-lore, fairy mythology, legends and traditions by Wirt Sikes

The nineteenth century saw a revival of interest in the folklore of nations across Europe. As such, English works such as The Cambrian Popular Antiquities by Peter Roberts (1815) and Welsh texts such as Ystên Sioned (1882) were published. The period also saw a number of folklore articles appearing in Welsh magazines. One publication, Y Genhinen (The Leek), was established with the intention to promote folklore studies and protect the traditions of Wales.

While the "historical myth-making of the eighteenth century" saw a new wave of patriotic interest in folklore and folk-culture, the nineteenth century saw this again challenged by wider British state. In 1847 the "Treachery of the Blue Books" was viewed by many as a renewed attack on ordinary Welsh life by the Anglican church and the British government. While the eighteenth and nineteenth centuries saw Wales as a state which "lacked status", it paradoxically saw Welsh folk-culture flourish.

== Folk narratives ==
=== Tales about animals with human characteristics ===
The most famous of these are the tales concerning the "Oldest Animals," in which a character gathers information from different animals until the oldest animal is located. Culhwch and Olwen lists the Blackbird of Cilgwri, the Stag of Rhedynfre, the Owl of Cwm Cowlyd, the Eagle of Gwernabwy, and the Salmon of Llyn Llyw. The Triad "The Three Elders of the World" lists several of the oldest birds.

=== Witches ===
Witches (Welsh: Gwrachod) form an important part of Welsh folklore throughout the centuries. While the most famous figure to be labeled as a witch, Ceridwen is considered a mythological being, legends such as the Nine Witches of Gloucester (found in the legends of Peredur son of Efrawg) and the Witches of Llanddona may be seen as folklore. While the Gwrach y Rhibyn is named as a "witch" she is considered a Cyhyraeth, a ghostly apparition.

=== Humour about actual persons or types ===
This includes White Lie Tales, which are obviously and intentionally untrue. Common elements include the narrator's experiences in America, adventures while being carried on wings of a large bird, growing enormous vegetables, prowess at shooting around corners, ability to see over great distances, buying a hare's egg at Pwllheli Fair. Famous recent authors in this genre are James Wade (Shemi Wad), Daniel Thomas (Daniel y Pant), Gruffydd Jones (Y Deryn Mawr) and John Pritchard (Siôn Ceryn Bach).

=== (Pseudo-)histories of notable figures ===
- Arthur (see separate section above)
- Twm Siôn Cati, often called the Welsh Robin Hood
- The Lives of Saints, originally written in Latin, and usually stressing a male saint's conception, birth and childhood, while emphasizing a female saint's adolescence, virginity and sexual conflict (fleeing marriage or rape). These include the Life of St. David by Rhygyfarch, and the Life of Cadog by Lifris of Llancarfan. The MSS Cotton Vespasian Axiv, written around 1200, collects the lives of numerous saints. Another important collection is The Book of the Anchorite of Llanddewibrefi.

=== Local legends of historical or pseudo-historical figures ===
This includes Gwylliaid Cochion Mawddwy, a group of bandits who lived in Merioneth in the 16th century, mentioned in Thomas Pennant's Tours of Wales and other sources.

It also includes the legend of Gelert, the namesake of the town of Beddgelert (whose name means "Gelert's Grave") in the Gwynedd area of Wales. The folktale is said to take place in the 13th century, and acts as a moral story about making hasty and rash decisions. In the legend, Llywelyn the Great, then-Prince of North Wales returned from hunting to find his baby missing, the cradle overturned, and his faithful hound Gelert with blood-stained fur and teeth. Believing the dog had killed his child and heir, Llywelyn drew his sword and killed Gelert. After the dog's dying yelp, Llywelyn heard the cries of his baby, unharmed and behind the cradle, along with a dead wolf which had attacked the child and been killed by Gelert. Llywelyn is overcome with sorrow and buries the dog, traumatised from its dying yelp. After that day, Llywelyn was said to never smile again.

=== Place-name or topography tales ===
This includes onomastic lore, which explains place-names. One notable example comes from the Historia Britonum, in which the name 'Carn Cafal' comes from a carn (or pile of stones) which mark the footprint of Arthur's dog Cafal.

== Sources ==
There are many examples of folk literary traditions in Nennius' book Historia Brittonum, written around the start of the 9th century. There are scattered motifs of Middle Welsh prose, and many references can also be found in the works of the bards: for example in some of Taliesin's works and in that of the Poets of the Princes.

It is only comparatively recently that the Welsh folk tales were collected and published. There are English language volumes such as The Cambrian Popular Antiquities by Peter Roberts (1815). One of the first Welsh language books is Ystên Sioned ("Janet's Pitcher", 1882), but this was preceded by a number of articles in Welsh language magazines. Y Genhinen ("The Leek") was established to promote studies of folk literature and to safeguard the traditions of Wales.

== Collectors of folk tales ==
- Poet-scholars: Rhys Meurig (Rice Merrick), George Owen of Henllys.
- Antiquarians: Edward Lhuyd, the Morris Brothers of Anglesey, Iolo Morganwg.
- Folklorists: Daniel Silvan Evans (Y Brython, 1858), Peter Roberts (Cambrian Popular Antiquities, 1815), W. Howells (Cambrian Superstitions, 1831), Isaac Foulkes (Cymru Fu, 1862), Wirt Sikes (British Goblins, 1880), Daniel Silvan Evans, John Jones and others (Ysten Sioned), Elias Owen (Welsh Folklore, 1896), Marie Trevelyan (Folklore and Folk Stories of Wales, 1909), J. Ceredig Davies (Folk-Lore of West and Mid-Wales, 1911).

== See also ==
- Welsh mythology
