= T. H. Thomas =

Welsh artist (1839–1915)

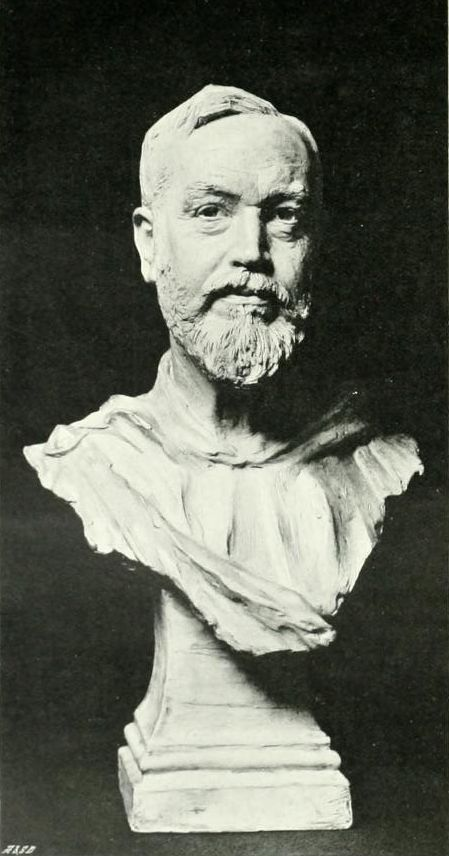
Bust by Goscombe John

Thomas Henry Thomas (31 March 1839 – 5 July 1915) was a Welsh artist particularly active in Cardiff. He was also interested in botany, geology, history, and archaeology which were often the subjects of his art works. He was a Fellow of the Royal Cambrian Academy of Art which was established in 1881. He was a leading force behind the founding of the National Museum of Wales and in the use of the red dragon symbolizing Wales.

== Early life ==
Thomas was born on 31 March 1839 in Pontypool, where his father was president of the Baptist College, though his parents were from Cardiff. He studied at Bristol School of Art, Carey's Art School, London, then the Royal Academy Schools, before travelling to Paris and Rome. He returned to London in 1861 to work as a painter and illustrator.

== Life and creative work ==
In 1866, Thomas returned to settle in Cardiff (Thomas's father had retired there). He inherited his father's house on The Walk in 1880 and this became a place for intellectual discussion in the town. He became very active in the Cardiff Naturalists Society (being president for a while), the Cambrian Academy of Art and the Welsh National Eisteddfod. Thomas was an official guest at the first Feis Ceoil in 1897.

Thomas worked for The Daily Graphic where he depicted different scenes of that time the likes of work on the Severn Tunnel at Portskewett, and royal visits. He illustrated in his painting a "complete catalogue of the major concerns of the 19th century". His painting can be compared with J. W. Goethe and John Ruskin by the common tradition. As well as formers he tried to connect the art and science more tightly.

Because of his interest in geology, he discovered an important dinosaur fossil which was unknown to science of that time. This petrifaction was found by him in a large stone stove in the Newton Nottage church' yard. It was named Brontozoum thomasii in his honour.

He died on 5 July 1915 in Cardiff. His more than 1,000 prints, drawings and watercolours were given to the National Museum of Wales after his death in 1915 according to his will.

== Selected works ==
- Elijah and the Ravens, late 1919, National Museum Wales, National Museum Cardiff.
- Gannet Settlement on Grassholm, West of Milford, 1890, National Museum Wales, National Museum Cardiff.
- Sackcloth and Ashes: Tip Girls Leaving Work, c.1879, Cyfarthfa Castle Museum & Art Gallery.
- Christ and the Woman of Samaria, late 1919, National Museum Wales, National Museum Cardiff.
