= Wirt Sikes =

American journalist

William Wirt Sikes (November 23, 1836 – August 18, 1883) was an American journalist and writer, perhaps best known today for his writings on Welsh folklore and customs.

== Early life ==
William Wirt Sikes was born in Watertown, New York, the son of William Johnson Sikes, a prominent local physician. He was the seventh of eleven children, of whom only six survived to adulthood. Sikes himself was seriously ill as a child and almost lost his hearing, so he was largely educated at home. At fourteen he went to work for a printer and learned how to set type. He supported himself thereafter by typesetting, contributing to local newspapers, and giving temperance lectures.

At the age of nineteen, on August 28, 1855, he married Jeannette Annie Wilcox (1837–1889); they had two children, George Preston Sikes (1856–1957) and Clara Jeanette Sikes (1858–1956).

== Career in America ==
In 1856 he was working at the Utica Morning Herald as a typesetter and contributor. He published a book of stories and poems, A Book for the Winter-Evening Fireside, in 1858. He spent time in Chicago working at newspapers there, and around 1860 worked on a paper called City and Country in Nyack, New York. In 1862 he was given the job of canal inspector in Chicago for the state-owned Illinois and Michigan Canal. While in Chicago he was separated from his wife, by mutual consent; they divorced in 1870.

Between 1865 and 1867 he went to New York City to work on newspapers there; he took a special interest in the lives of the poor there. He continued to write, publishing stories in The Youth's Companion, Oliver Optic's Magazine, and others. He published two novels, The World's Broad Stage (serialized in the Toledo Blade) and One Poor Girl (1869). Sikes gave lectures and was represented by the Boston Lyceum Bureau from 1869 to 1871; he married fellow lecturer Olive Logan on December 27, 1871.

== In Europe ==
After their marriage the couple went to Europe, where they continued to practice journalism. Sikes produced a biographical and critical piece on the Wiertz Museum for Harper's Magazine in 1873 which was later reprinted by the museum.

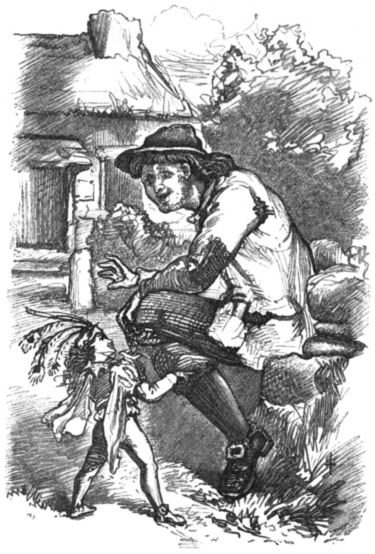
"Rowli and the Ellyll" by T. H. Thomas from Sike's British Goblins Welsh folk-lore, fairy mythology, legends and traditions (1880)

In June 1876 Sikes was appointed U.S. Consul at Cardiff, Wales. Over the next few years Sikes produced a number of pieces on Welsh folklore, mythology, and customs, collected as British Goblins; Welsh Folk-Lore, Fairy Mythology, Legends, and Traditions (1880) and Rambles and Studies in Old South Wales (1881). He also wrote Studies of Assassination (1881). He died in Brompton in 1883 and was buried in Brookwood Cemetery, Brookwood, Surrey.

Sikes is said to have used as many as thirty pseudonyms for his prolific output, as well as material published under his own name. As "Burton Saxe" he wrote the dime novel The Black Hunter; or, The Cave Secret (American Tales #22, 1865).

== A literary appreciation ==
In George Presbury Rowell's memoir Forty Years an Advertising Agent, he recalls a column in the New York Tribune, "wherein certain literary characters were reviewed in grades and classes, beginning with - I don't remember whom, Thackeray perhaps, and descending, as the editor expressed it, 'down to Wirt Sikes'".

== See also ==
- Welsh culture
- Welsh folklore
- Welsh mythology
