= Turandot discography =

Recordings of Puccini's opera

This is a list of audio and video recordings (discography) of Giacomo Puccini's 1926 Italian opera Turandot. The first recorded extracts were made in Dresden in 1926 with Anne Roselle and Paul Schöffler and Fritz Busch conducting the Dresden Staatskapelle.

== Audio recordings ==
Year	Cast (Turandot, Calaf, Liù, Timur)	Conductor, Opera house and orchestra	Label
1938	Gina Cigna, Francesco Merli, Magda Olivero, Luciano Neroni	Franco Ghione; RAI National Symphony Orchestra and chorus	CD: Naxos; Cat: 8.110193-94
1955	Inge Borkh, Mario Del Monaco, Renata Tebaldi, Nicola Zaccaria	Alberto Erede; Accademia Nazionale di Santa Cecilia orchestra and chorus	CD: Decca; Cat: 452964
1957	Maria Callas, Eugenio Fernandi, Elisabeth Schwarzkopf, Nicola Zaccaria	Tullio Serafin; Teatro alla Scala orchestra and chorus	CD: EMI Classics; Cat: 56307
1958	Birgit Nilsson, Giuseppe Di Stefano, Rosanna Carteri, Giuseppe Modesti	Antonio Votto; Teatro alla Scala orchestra and chorus	CD: ALLEGRO; Cat: OPD-1256
1959	Birgit Nilsson, Jussi Björling, Renata Tebaldi, Giorgio Tozzi	Erich Leinsdorf; Teatro dell'Opera di Roma orchestra and chorus	CD: RCA Victor; Cat: 09026626872
1961	Birgit Nilsson, Franco Corelli, Anna Moffo, Bonaldo Giaiotti	Leopold Stokowski; Metropolitan Opera orchestra and chorus (1961 Grammy Award for Best Opera Recording)	CD: Cantus; Cat: CACD 5.01617 (released 2012)
1964	Birgit Nilsson, Franco Corelli, Galina Vishnevskaya, Nicola Zaccaria	Gianandrea Gavazzeni; Teatro alla Scala orchestra and chorus	CD: The Opera Lovers; Cat: TURA 196402 (1 CD)
1965	Birgit Nilsson, Franco Corelli, Renata Scotto, Bonaldo Giaiotti	Francesco Molinari-Pradelli; Teatro dell'Opera di Roma orchestra and chorus	CD: EMI Classics; Cat: 077776932729
1970	George Mircea, Maria Slatinaru, Octav Enigarescu, Valentin Teodorian,	Carol Litvin; Romanian Radio Symphony orchestra Romanian Radio/TV chorus	CD: Vox Box; Cat: 5160
1972	Joan Sutherland, Luciano Pavarotti, Montserrat Caballé, Nicolai Ghiaurov	Zubin Mehta; London Philharmonic Orchestra; John Alldis Choir; Wandsworth School Boys Choir	CD: Decca; Cat: 414274
1977	Montserrat Caballé, José Carreras, Mirella Freni, Paul Plishka	Alain Lombard; Orchestre philharmonique de Strasbourg; Rhine Opera chorus Maitrise de la Cathedrale de Strasbourg	CD: EMI Classics; Cat: 65293
1977	Montserrat Caballé, Luciano Pavarotti, Leona Mitchell, Giorgio Tozzi	Riccardo Chailly; San Francisco Opera orchestra and chorus	CD: Gala; Cat: GL 100.534
1981	Katia Ricciarelli, Plácido Domingo, Barbara Hendricks, Ruggero Raimondi	Herbert von Karajan; Vienna State Opera orchestra and chorus Vienna Sängerknaben	CD: Deutsche Grammophon; Cat: 423855
1984	Éva Marton, José Carreras, Katia Ricciarelli, Kurt Rydl	Lorin Maazel; Vienna Philharmonic; Vienna State Opera chorus	CD: CBS Masterworks; Cat: M2J39160
1989	Ghena Dimitrova, Nicola Martinucci, Cecilia Gasdia, Roberto Scandiuzzi	Daniel Oren; Orchestra e Coro del Teatro Comunale dell'Opera di Genova	CD: Nuova Era; Cat: 6786/87
2001	Giovanna Casolla, Lando Bartolini, Masako Deguci, Felipe Bou	Alexander Rahbari; Malaga Philharmonic Orchestra; Choral Society of Bilbao	CD: Naxos; 8.660089-90
2022	Sondra Radvanovsky; Jonas Kaufmann; Ermonela Jaho; Michele Pertusi	Antonio Pappano; Orchestra dell'Accademia Nazionale di Santa Cecilia and chorus (Uses the original ending by Franco Alfano.)	CD: Warner Classics

== Video recordings ==
Year	Cast (Turandot, Calaf, Liù, Timur)	Conductor, Opera house and orchestra	Stage director	Label
1958	Lucilla Udovich, Franco Corelli, Renata Mattioli, Plinio Clabassi	Fernando Previtali, RAI Milan Orchestra & Chorus	Mario Lanfranchi	DVD: VAI; Cat: 4300; DVD: Premiere Opera; Cat: 5413
1969	Birgit Nilsson, Gianfranco Cecchele, Gabriella Tucci, Boris Carmeli	Georges Prêtre, RAI National Symphony Orchestra & Chorus	Margherita Wallman	DVD: Encore, Cat: 2116; VHS: Legato Classics Cat: LCV 011; VHS: Bel Canto Society Cat: 545
1983	Ghena Dimitrova, Nicola Martinucci, Cecilia Gasdia, Ivo Vinco	Maurizio Arena, Arena di Verona Orchestra & Chorus	Giuliano Montaldo	VHS: Castle Vision; Cat: CVI 2004
1983	Éva Marton, José Carreras, Katia Ricciarelli, John-Paul Bogart	Lorin Maazel, Vienna State Opera Orchestra & Chorus	Harold Prince	DVD: Arthaus Musik 109094; Blu-ray: Arthaus Musik 109095
1987	Éva Marton, Plácido Domingo, Leona Mitchell, Paul Plishka	James Levine, Metropolitan Opera Orchestra & Chorus	Franco Zeffirelli	DVD: DGG; Cat: 00440 073 0589; Streaming video: Met Opera on Demand
1994	Éva Marton, Michael Sylvester, Lucia Mazzaria, Kevin Langan	Donald Runnicles, San Francisco Opera Orchestra & Orchestra (Set designer: David Hockney)	Peter McClintock	DVD: Arthaus Musik 100089
1998	Giovanna Casolla, Sergej Larin, Barbara Frittoli, Carlo Colombara	Zubin Mehta; Maggio Musicale Fiorentino orchestra and chorus	Zhang Yimou	DVD: RCA Red Seal 74321-60917-2
2002	Gabriele Schnaut, Johan Botha, Cristina Gallardo-Domâs, Paata Burchuladze	Valery Gergiev; Vienna Philharmonic; Tölzer Knabenchor; Vienna State Opera chorus	David Pountney	DVD: TDK «Mediactive» Cat: DV-OPTURSF
2008	Maria Guleghina, Marco Berti, Alexia Voulgaridou, Alexander Tsymbalyuk	Zubin Mehta; Valencian Community Orchestra	Chen Kaige	DVD: Unitel Classica; Cat: A9 3001747; Blu-ray: C Major; Cat: 700308
2009	Maria Guleghina, Marcello Giordani, Marina Poplavskaya, Samuel Ramey	Andris Nelsons; Metropolitan Opera Orchestra & Chorus	Franco Zeffirelli	DVD: Decca 0743426
2015	Nina Stemme, Aleksandrs Antonenko, Maria Agresta, Alexander Tsymbalyuk	Riccardo Chailly; Teatro alla Scala (Completed by Luciano Berio)	Nikolaus Lehnhoff	DVD: Decca 0743937; Blu-ray: Decca 0743938
2018	Rebeka Lokar, Jorge de León, Erika Grimaldi, In-Sung Sim	Gianandrea Noseda; Orchestra and Chorus of the Teatro Regio Torino	Stefano Poda	DVD: C Major 748108; Blu-ray: C Major 748204
2020	Iréne Theorin, Gregory Kunde, Yolanda Auyanet, Andrea Mastroni	Nicola Luisotti; Teatro Real orchestra and chorus	Robert Wilson	DVD:Bel Air Classiques; Cat:BAC570
2023	Asmik Grigorian, Jonas Kaufmann, Kristina Mkhitaryan, Dan Paul Dumitrescu	Marco Armiliato, Vienna State Opera Orchestra & Chorus (Recorded live, 10 & 13 December, with the original ending by Franco Alfano.)	Claus Guth	4K UHD: C-Major/Unitel; A04050352
