= Lady Macbeth of Mtsensk discography =

Recordings of the Shostakovich opera

This is a list of audio and video recordings (discography) of Dimitri Shostakovich's opera Lady Macbeth of Mtsensk. The work was premiered as Op. 29 on 22 January 1934 at Leningrad's Malïy Opernïy Teatr. The opera was essentially banned in 1936, and Shostakovich later revised it in a toned-down version with the title Katerina Ismailova (or Katerina Izmaylova), Op. 114, which was first performed 8 January 1963 at Moscow's Stanislavsky–Nemirovich-Danchenko Music Theatre.

== Audio recordings ==
Year	Cast (Katerina, Sergei, Aksinya, Zinovy, Boris, Sonyetka, Old Convict)	Conductor, Opera house and orchestra	Label
1963	Eleonora Andreyeva, Gennadi Efimov, Dina Potapovskaya, Vyacheslav Radzievsky, Eduard Bulavin, Nina Isakova, Georgi Dudarev	Gennady Provatorov, Stanislavsky and Danchenko Music Drama Theatre, Moscow (Studio recording, Katerina Ismailova, Op. 114, revised version)	LP: Melodiya; Cat: D 013709-16; LP: HMV Melodiya; Cat: SLS 5050
1978	Galina Vishnevskaya, Nicolai Gedda, Taru Valjakka, Werner Krenn, Dimiter Petkov, Birgit Finnilä, Alexander Malta	Mstislav Rostropovich, London Philharmonic Orchestra, Ambrosian Opera Chorus (Studio recording, original version) (1992 TV film directed by Petr Weigl with actors miming this recording released on DVD by Image Entertainment in 2000)	CD: EMI; Cat: 7 49955 2
1983	Gizela Tsipola, Sergei Dubrovin, Oxana Yatsenko, Vladimir Gurov, Aleksandr Zagrebelny, Galina Tuftina, Anatoly Kotcherga	Stepan Turchak, Shevchenko Opera and Ballet Theatre of Kiev (Studio recording, Katerina Ismailova, Op. 114, revised version)	LP: Melodiya; Cat: C10 21393 004; CD: Le Chant du Monde/ Harmonia Mundi; LDC278 1021/23
1992	Maria Ewing, Sergei Larin, Kristine Ciesinski, Philip Langridge, Aage Haugland, Elena Zaremba, Kurt Moll	Myung-Whun Chung, Paris Opera Orchestra & Chorus (Studio recording, original version)	CD: Deutsche Grammophon; Cat: 437 511-2
2009	Angela Denoke, Misha Didyk, Donna Ellen, Marian Talaba, Kurt Rydl, Nadia Krasteva, Dan Paul Dumitrescu	Ingo Metzmacher, Vienna State Opera Orchestra & Chorus (Original version, recorded live, 23 October)	CD: Orfeo
2022	Svetlana Sozdateleva, Brandon Jovanovich, Felicia Moore , Nikolai Schukoff, John Relyea, Maria Barakova, Alexander Tsymbalyuk	Keri-Lynn Wilson, Metropolitan Opera Orchestra & Chorus (Original version, recorded live, 12 October, Metropolitan Opera House)	Streaming audio: Met Opera on Demand
2024	Kristine Opolais, Brenden Gunnell, Michelle Trainor, Peter Hoare, John Relyea, Maria Barakova, Dmitry Belosselskiy	Andris Nelsons, Boston Symphony Orchestra, Tanglewood Festival Chorus (Original version, recorded live, 27 January, Boston Symphony Hall)	CD: Deutsche Grammophon; Cat: 486 7062

== Video recordings ==
Year	Cast (Katerina, Sergei, Aksinya, Zinovy, Boris, Sonyetka, Old Convict)	Conductor, Opera house and orchestra	Label
1966	Galina Vishnevskaya, Vasil Tretyak, -----, Vyacheslav Radzievsky, Alexander Vedernikov, Valentina Reka, -----	Konstantin Simeonov, Shevchenko Opera and Ballet Theatre of Kiev (1966 film of Katerina Ismailova, Op. 114, revised version, heavily cut, directed by Mikhail Shapiro; Vishnevskaya plays Katerina; actors mime the other parts)	DVD: Decca; Cat: 074 3137DH
1992	Markéta Hrubesová, Michal Dlouhý, Eva Slosarova, Václav Neckár, Petr Haničinec, Sona Valentová, -----	Mstislav Rostropovich, London Philharmonic Orchestra, Ambrosian Opera Chorus (1992 TV film directed by Petr Weigl; the actors, listed here, mime the 1978 audio recording conducted by Rostropovich, which is cut from 152 to 100 minutes)	DVD: Carlton, Image Entertainment
2002	Nadine Secunde, Christopher Ventris, Mireille Capelle, Francisco Vas, Anatoly Kotcherga, Nino Surguladze, Yevgeny Nesterenko	Alexander Anissimov, Orchestra & Chorus of the Gran Teatre del Liceu, Chamber Chorus of the Palau de la Música Catalana, Barcelona (Original version, recorded live, May, stage director: Stein Winge)	DVD: EMI Classics; DVB 5 99730 9
2006	Eva-Maria Westbroek, Christopher Ventris, Carole Wilson, Ludovít Ludha, Vladimir Vaneyev, Lani Poulson, Carole Wilson	Mariss Jansons, Dutch National Opera, Royal Concertgebouw Orchestra, Chorus of Netherlands Opera (Original version, composite live recording, Amsterdam Het Musiektheater, directed by Martin Kušej)	DVD: Opus Arte
2008	Jeanne-Michèle Charbonnet, Sergej Kunaev, Nanà Miriani, Vsevolod Grivnoy, Vladimir Vaneev, Natascha Petrinsky, -----	James Conlon, Orchestra & Chorus of Maggio Musicale Fiorentino (Original version, recorded live, June, Teatro Comunale, directed by Lev Dodin)	Blu-ray: Arthaus Musik
2019	Aušrine Stundytė, Pavel Černoch, Sofija Petrovic, John Daszak, Dmitry Ulyanov, Oksana Volkova, Alexander Tsymbalyuk	Ingo Metzmacher, Orchestra & Chorus of the Paris Opera (Original version, recorded live, 16 April, Opéra Bastille, directed by Krzysztof Warlikowski)	HD video: Paris Opera Play
