= Stuart Burrows =

Welsh tenor (1933–2025)

Stuart Burrows OBE
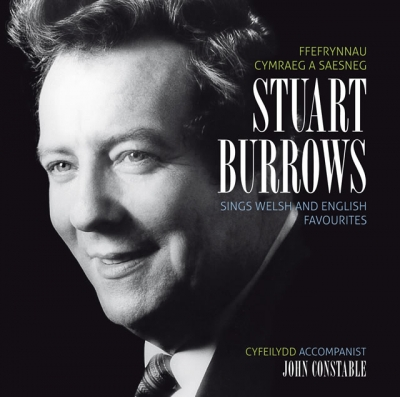
- Album cover (2009)
- Born: 7 February 1933; Cilfynydd, Pontypridd, Wales
- Died: 29 June 2025 (aged 92); Cardiff, Wales
- Occupation: Operatic tenor
- Spouse: Enid Lewis (m. 1957; died 1985)

James Stuart Burrows (7 February 1933 – 29 June 2025) was a Welsh operatic tenor. Adept at oratorios and operas, he earned international recognition and the nickname "King of Mozart" for his focus on Mozart operas. He performed regularly at the Royal Opera House in London from 1967 for 22 years and at the Metropolitan Opera in New York City from 1971 for 12 years. Burrows featured in a BBC television series in the 1980s called Stuart Burrows Sings.

== Life and career ==
Myfanwy by Burrows (1992)

The opening few bars of "Calon Lân" by Burrows (1993)

James Stuart Burrows was born on 7 February 1933, the second of the three children of Albert Burrows and Gladys (née Powell), at 19 William Street in Cilfynydd, near Pontypridd in South Wales. (Note: The same street was the birthplace of fellow opera star Sir Geraint Evans, Evans's brother-in-law Welsh rugby international Glyn Davies, and politician Lord Merlyn Rees.) As a boy, he had a soprano voice and sang from his bedroom window to neighbours on the street below. His first solo performance, at age 10, was in a Christmas concert and he became known for his performances at his local chapel.

A skilled rugby player, he was offered a contract by Leeds Rugby League Club, but at the last minute he decided against taking it. He began his working career as a teacher in Bargoed, but after he won a 1954 singing competition, he studied voice simultaneously at the Trinity University College of Carmarthen. He first performed in concerts and recitals.

In 1963, Burrows appeared first at the Welsh National Opera as Ismael in Verdi's Nabucco. His roles there included Rodolfo in Puccini's La bohème, Macduff in Verdi's Macbeth, the Duke in Verdi's Rigoletto, Ernesto in Donizetti's Don Pasquale and Hans in Smetana's The Bartered Bride. In 1967, he was chosen by Stravinsky's for the title role of his Oedipus rex at the Athens Festival which he conducted; it earned the singer international acclaim.

Burrows performed many times over 22 seasons at the Royal Opera House, where his first role was Beppe in Leoncavallo's Pagliacci in 1967, followed by Fenton in Verdi's Falstaff and Elvino in Bellini's La sonnambula. Major roles there included Tamino in Mozart's Die Zauberflöte in 1968 and Jack in Tippett's The Midsummer Marriage. He toured with the company to Japan and the US. He later performed there Don Ottavio in Mozart's Don Giovanni and the title role of Gounod's Faust, in 1974, 1976 and again in 1986.

He appeared at the San Francisco Opera first in 1967, as Tamino, which was also his first role at the Vienna State Opera in 1970. He performed as Don Ottavio at the 1970 Salzburg Festival, conducted by Herbert von Karajan.

He first appeared at the Metropolitan Opera in New York City in 1971, as Don Ottavio with Cesare Siepi as Don Giovanni. His roles over 12 years included Tamino with Edda Moser as the Queen of the Night, and Belmonte in Mozart's Die Entführung aus dem Serail with Kathleen Battle as Konstanze, Pinkerton in Puccini's Madama Butterfly, Alfredo in Verdi's La traviata, and Faust.

He made his debut at La Scala in Milan in 1978 in the title role of Berlioz's La Damnation de Faust. His performances included Don Ottavio at La Monnaie in Brussels and at the San Diego Opera, Gounod's Faust at La Scala, Belmonte at the Paris Opéra, the title role in Les contes d'Hoffmann at the Cologne Opera and the La Monnaie. He sang in Mozart's Requiem at the Cardiff Festival of Choirs. His performances in Mozart roles earned him the title of a "King of Mozart".

Burrows made television appearances in Australia, North America and Europe, including a BBC television series in the 1980s called Stuart Burrows Sings; he sang ballads and arias with guests including Isobel Buchanan, Marie McLaughlin and Valerie Masterson.

Burrows received several awards and fellowships, including an Honorary Doctorate from the University of Wales in 1981, a fellowship from Trinity University College in 1989, an honorary fellowship from the University of Wales at Aberystwyth, and an honorary plaque affixed to a LeShuttle locomotive granted by Eurotunnel in 1992. In 2007, Burrows was appointed an Officer of the Order of the British Empire (OBE). He received the Freedom of the Borough of Rhondda Cynon Taf on 31 January 2008.

He also contributed to singers and charitable causes, launching an International Singing Competition and establishing an international voice award at Carmarthen's Trinity College, and was president of various charitable organizations throughout south Wales.

=== Personal life and death ===
Burrows married Enid Lewis in 1957; the couple had two children and were married until her death in 1985. Burrows lived in South Wales, where he enjoyed gardening.

Burrows died following a short illness at a hospice in Cardiff, on 29 June 2025, aged 92. He was described by protégé Aled Jones as "the greatest lyric tenor of his generation".

== Recordings ==
- Lensky in Tchaikovsky's Eugene Onegin, with Georg Solti; used as the score to Petr Weigl's film of the opera
- Soloist in Beethoven's Choral Symphony, with Georg Solti and the Chicago Symphony Orchestra

== Sources ==
- Powell, Dean (2006). Images of Wales: Cilfynydd. The History Press. ISBN 978-0752-4378-04.
