= Pontypridd High School =

Location
- Albion Community Campus; Cilfynydd, Pontypridd, Glamorgan, CF37 4SF; Wales
- Coordinates: 51°37′27″N 3°19′18″W

Information
- Motto: Ymdrech A Lwydda (Success through Effort)
- Local authority: Rhondda Cynon Taff
- Head Teacher: Huw Cripps
- Gender: Coeducational
- Age: 11+
- Former name: Coedylan Comprehensive School / Pontypridd County Grammar School
- Website: http://www.pontypriddhighschool.co.uk

Pontypridd High School (Welsh: Ysgol Uwchradd Pontypridd) (formerly known as Coedylan Comprehensive) is an English-medium comprehensive school in the village of Cilfynydd near Pontypridd, in the county borough of Rhondda Cynon Taf, Wales.

== Admissions ==
It is for ages 11–18. It is on the west side of the A470.

== History ==
=== Grammar school ===
It was known as Pontypridd County Grammar School, a boys' grammar school, which had been established in 1895 as a co-educational school, and later became a single-sex school.

=== Comprehensive ===
When becoming comprehensive, it was known as Coedylan Comprehensive School.

== Notable former pupils ==
=== Pontypridd County Grammar School ===
- Desmond Brayley, Baron Brayley
- Sir Ivor Broom, station commander of RAF Brüggen from 1962–64, AOC of No. 11 Group RAF from 1970–72, and controller from 1974-77 of National Air Traffic Services (NATS)
- Anthony Crockett, Bishop of Bangor from 2004–08
- Glyn Davies, rugby player
- Sir Trevor Evans, journalist
- Bernard Hedges, professional cricketer with Glamorgan CCC, 1950-1967
- John Hopkins, fellow of Downing College Cambridge, 1961-2004, and university lecturer in law; afterwards emeritus fellow
- Maldwyn James, rugby player
- Brynmor John, Labour MP from 1970-88 for Pontypridd
- David Lloyd Jones, Lord Lloyd-Jones, judge of the High Court (QBD) (2005–12), Lord Justice of Appeal (2012-2017), and first justice of the Supreme Court of the United Kingdom to come from Wales (2017-2022) and (2022- ).
- Geraint Stanley Jones, broadcaster, chief executive from 1989-94 of S4C, Controller from 1981-85 of BBC Wales
- David Kelly, biological weapons expert
- Paul Lewis (lawyer) K.C. (Barrister; former Leader of the Wales and Chester Circuit.)
- Gareth Owen, vice-chancellor from 1985-87 of the University of Wales, and principal from 1979-89 of University College of Wales, Aberystwyth
- Morfydd Llwyn Owen (1891-1918), composer, pianist and mezzo-soprano
- Gareth Payne, rugby player
- Alun Richards, author
- Tudor Rickards, academic
- Sir Tasker Watkins, VC, former High Court judge (1971-1980), Lord Justice of Appeal (1980-1993) and deputy Lord Chief Justice (1988-1993). President of the Welsh Rugby Union, 1993-2004
- Alun Williams, radio presenter
- Gareth Wood (1950-2023), composer and double-bassist

=== Coedylan Comprehensive School And Pontypridd High School ===
- Kevin Courtney, former physics teacher, and General Secretary from 2016-2017 of the NUT
- Ash Morgan, singer
- Kimberley Nixon, actress
- Ceri Sweeney, Welsh rugby union international (1991-1998)
- Martyn Williams, Welsh rugby union international (1987-1994)
- Cory Hill, Welsh rugby union international and British and Irish Lions, 2016–present
- Jarrod Evans, Wales rugby union international, 2019–Present
