= Cilfynydd RFC =

Welsh rugby union club

- Full name: Cilfynydd Rugby Football Club
- Nickname(s): Bumble Bees
- Location: Cilfynydd, Wales
- Ground(s): Welfare Ground
- Coach(es): Owen Sheppeard
- League(s): WRU Division three East Central
- 2024/25: 9th (WRU Division Two East Central)
Team kit

Cilfynydd Rugby Football Club is a Welsh rugby union club based in Cilfynydd near Pontypridd, Wales. The club is a member of the Welsh Rugby Union.

== Club badge ==
The Cilfynydd RFC badge consists of a yellow and black shield split into quarters. The four quarters each contain an icon symbolising the culture of Cilfynydd; the Old Bridge, Pontypridd, the Welsh flower, the daffodil, a coal mine winding tower and finally the Prince of Wales's feathers.

== Club honours ==
- Glamorgan County Silver Ball Trophy 1983/84 - Winners
- Glamorgan County Silver Ball Trophy 1984/85 - Winners

== Notable former players ==
- (Wales) Iorrie Isaacs 1933
- (Wales) Stanley Powell 1935
- (Wales) Joe Jones ≤1936
- (Wales) Maldwyn James 1947
- (Wales) Glyn Davies 1947
