= Maldwyn James =

- Born: David Maldwyn James; 28 June 1913 Cilfynydd, Wales
- Died: 19 July 2003 (aged 90) Aberdare, Wales
- Occupation(s): Miner mining engineer

Rugby union career
- Position: Hooker
Amateur team(s)
Years	Team	Apps	(Points)
–	Cilfynydd RFC		
–	Pontypridd RFC		
–	Cardiff RFC		
International career
Years	Team	Apps	(Points)
1947–1948	Wales	5	(0)

David Maldwyn James (28 June 1913 – 19 July 2003) was a Welsh international rugby union player.

Born in Cilfynydd, Glamorgan, he attended Pontypridd Boys Grammar School before working underground as a collier for the Albion Colliery, Cilfynydd. During the early 1930s he played rugby for Cilfynydd RFC and Pontypridd RFC in the position of hooker, although he was also a skilled goal-kicker and all-rounder. In 1937 and 1938 he was selected for the Wales international trials but a severe injury to his right foot kept him away from the game until 1941.

In 1945 he joined Cardiff RFC, contributing 145 points to the season, and eventually making 85 appearances for the club. During his time at Cardiff he played in four 'Victory' internationals for Wales at the end of the Second World War. Caps were not awarded for these matches.

In the Wales v Australia match of 20 December 1947 at the Cardiff Arms Park, James became the oldest player to make a debut for Wales, aged 34 and five months. He played throughout the 1948 season, against England, Scotland, France and finally Ireland, winning five Welsh caps. Thereafter he retired from rugby but continued to be involved with Cardiff RFC serving on the Committee in season 1949–50 and thereafter in many capacities until he retired in 1959–60. He was appointed again to the Committee in 1972–73 and was chairman in season 1975–76 before finally retiring in 1984. .

James had qualified as a mining engineer in 1941 and rose to become the manager of several South Wales collieries, including the Albion Colliery. At the time of his retirement in 1973 he was NCB South Wales East Area Group Manager.
