= Albion Colliery =

Coal mine in Wales

Coordinates: 51°37′31″N 3°19′18″W

Albion Colliery was a coal mine in South Wales Valleys, located in the village of Cilfynydd, one mile north of Pontypridd.

== Location ==
The Colliery was located along the well known A470 road, a long-distance road from Cardiff to Llandudno. The site is now home to Pontypridd High School, whose pupils commemorated the 120th anniversary of the disaster by participating in a project, recreating the events in the form of a film.

== Development ==
The Albion Steam Coal Co. began sinking in 1884 at Ynyscaedudwg Farm. Its two shafts opened in August 1887; 19 feet in diameter, they were sunk 33 yards apart to a depth of 646 yards. Production at the colliery quickly flourished and its average weekly output soon reached 12,000 tonnes. This was the largest tonnage for a single shaft colliery in the whole of South Wales.

The colliery brought immigration from England, Scotland and Ireland for the work opportunities available.

== Life in the Colliery ==
Coal mines in South Wales were the number one employers with collieries like the Albion Colliery dominating the landscape. The miners worked extremely hard for not much money at all as the majority of the profit went to the landowners and the shareholders. There was little regard to the poor working conditions or the safety of workers. Pit ponies were seen as far more valuable. If human life was lost, it could easily be replaced. Explosions and accidents were only a small part of the problem, many more people were affected by the working conditions and the exhausting jobs that they had to carry out. Long term physical damage of the bones and muscles were evident due to the heavy loads and cramped conditions. Miners also suffered with lung diseases from the amount of dust they were inhaling and the coal had to be cut by hand with a pick axe. Trade unions were difficult to join as the miners usually had to sign an agreement not to join them and if anyone did join a union, they would be sacked and blacklisted by all surrounding coal mines. The miners lived in poverty and could not afford to risk it.

== Accidents ==
Tragedy struck the colliery with three fatal mining accidents in ten years:

- 2 men were killed on 24 March 1886, during the sinking of the shafts
- 4 killed in November 1886, as production started

=== 1894 disaster ===
Albion was the scene of one of the worst disasters ever to occur in the South Wales Coalfield, second only to the later disaster at the Universal Colliery at Senghenydd in 1913.

At 4 o'clock on Saturday 23 June 1894, the night shift had just begun and the workers were clearing dust and repairing underground roadways when a massive explosion on the Groves level occurred. It was caused by the ignition of coal dust following an explosion of firedamp, and resulted in the deaths of 290 men and boys. Of the 125 horses underground, only two survived. Despite 16 men emerging from the disaster with their lives, only five of these survived. There were no female victims as it had been made illegal for women and children under the age of 12 to work underground in the mines, with the pit ponies replacing them to haul coal, which is why so many horses died alongside the workers. The youngest victim was only 13 and the oldest victim was 60, with the average age being 28 years old.

The bodies brought to the surface were initially assessed and stored in the colliery's stable hayloft, that acted as a temporary morgue. Many were so badly mutilated that identification was virtually impossible, and there were several instances of corpses being carried to the wrong houses. Another cause of confusion was that no-one knew how many men were below ground when the explosion occurred.

Almost everyone in the community lost someone in the disaster. One household in Howell Street lost 11 members: the father, his four sons, and six lodgers.

There is a memorial to the eleven killed who were not identified at St Mabon's Church, in Llanfabon.

=== 1894 inquest ===
The colliery was reopened within two weeks of the explosion, and an inquest opened in Pontypridd in August 1894. The differences of opinion between the owners, the inspectors and the professional witnesses led the jury to conclude that the explosion of gas was accelerated by coal dust, but it failed to agree on the cause. Because of this, the inquest lasted 9 days before it reached this conclusion. They did unanimously agree that shotfiring without sufficient precautions and contrary to the rules meant that that under manager had neglected his duties. The jury made recommendations to improve safety conditions. These recommendations included that shotfiring in timber should be prohibited, old working should be properly stowed and that the number of men in the mines should be kept at all times. The jury also suggested that more thorough inspections should be carried out and that they should be carried out by Her Majesty's inspectors as the present workmen representatives were deemed worthless. The inspectors responded by saying that apart from disagreeing on the origin of the explosion, their view were in accord with the jury. The inspectors insisted however that the inspections were not worthless or useless and were in fact a good thing when carried out properly, like they generally are carried out in South Wales and Monmouthshire. One of the few survivors, George Bamford, gave his account of the explosion to help the inquest.

Consequently, the Government appointed barrister Mr J Roskill to scrutinise the evidence. Roskill in his September 1894 report submitted to the Home Secretary was of the opinion that the explosion was caused by the blasting of timbers which ignited an accumulation of gas, which ignited the coal dust. Roskill concluded the risk was increased by dangerous working practices, including blasting of timbers during shifts, inadequate watering of the mine to lay dust and new Saturday shift patterns, so that there was no interval for clearing dust between shifts. Roskill recommended prosecuting the Albion Coal Company, but eventually only fines of £10 and £2 were imposed against manager Phillip Jones and chargeman William Anstes.

== Production ==
Albion was served throughout its entire life by the Llancaiach Branch line of the Taff Vale Railway, which enabled it to reach maximum production quickly.

In 1908 2,589 worked at the colliery, with the colliery reaching a maximum output of 325,000 tons in 1934. Following the liquidation of the Albion Co in 1928, the assets were purchased by Powell Duffryn, before it was nationalised after World War II to become part of the National Coal Board in 1947. At that time there were 991 men employed, reaching an output of 231,639 tons; this reached 620,000 tons after the Penrhiwceiber Colliery had been added to the production group.

The mine closed in September 1966.
