= Joe Jones (rugby) =

GB & Wales international rugby league footballer

Personal information
- Born: 20 April 1916 Cilfynydd, Wales
- Died: 11 January 1974 (aged 57) Barrow-in-Furness, England

Playing information

Rugby union
Club
Years	Team	Pld	T	G	FG	P
≤1936–36	Cilfynydd RFC

Rugby league
- Position: Fullback, Centre, Stand-off, Loose forward
Club
Years	Team	Pld	T	G	FG	P
1936–44	Wigan	113	7	41	0	103
1944–52	Barrow	221
	Total	334	7	41	0	103
Representative
Years	Team	Pld	T	G	FG	P
1940–49	Wales	15	0	0	0	0
1946	Great Britain	1	0	0	0	0

Joseph Jones (20 April 1916 – 11 January 1974) was a Welsh rugby union and professional rugby league footballer who played in the 1930s, 1940s and 1950s. He played club level rugby union (RU) for Cilfynydd RFC, and representative level rugby league (RL) for Great Britain and Wales, and at club level for Wigan and Barrow, as a fullback, centre, stand-off, or loose forward.

== Background ==
Joe Jones was born in Cilfynydd, Wales, and he died aged 57 in Barrow-in-Furness, Cumbria, England.

== Playing career ==
=== International honours ===
Joe Jones won 15 caps for Wales (RL) in 1940–1949 while at Wigan and Barrow, and won a cap for Great Britain (RL) while at Barrow in 1946 against New Zealand.

=== Championship final appearances ===
Joe Jones played fullback in Wigan's 13–9 victory over Dewsbury in the Championship Final first-leg during the 1943–44 season at Central Park, Wigan on Saturday 13 May 1944 (Jim Sullivan played fullback in the second-leg).

=== County League appearances ===
Joe Jones played in Wigan's victory in the Lancashire League during the World War II affected 1940–41 season.

=== Challenge Cup Final appearances ===
Joe Jones was a non-playing reserve to travel in Barrow's 0–10 defeat by Wigan in the 1950–51 Challenge Cup Final during the 1950–51 season at Wembley Stadium, London on Saturday 5 May 1951.

=== Club career ===
Joe Jones changed rugby football codes from rugby union to rugby league when he transferred from Cilfynydd RFC to Wigan during 1936, he made his début for Wigan in the 5–14 defeat by Warrington at Wilderspool Stadium, Warrington on Saturday 7 November 1936, he scored his first try for Wigan in the 8–0 victory over Batley at Mount Pleasant, Batley on Saturday 17 December 1938, he scored his last try for Wigan in the 25–3 victory over Oldham in the Challenge Cup 1^{st} round 2^{nd} leg at Central Park, Wigan on Saturday 18 March 1944, he played his last match for Wigan in the 0–8 defeat by Bradford Northern in the Challenge Cup Final 2^{nd} leg at Odsal Stadium, Bradford on Saturday 22 April 1944, he transferred from Wigan to Barrow during 1944.
