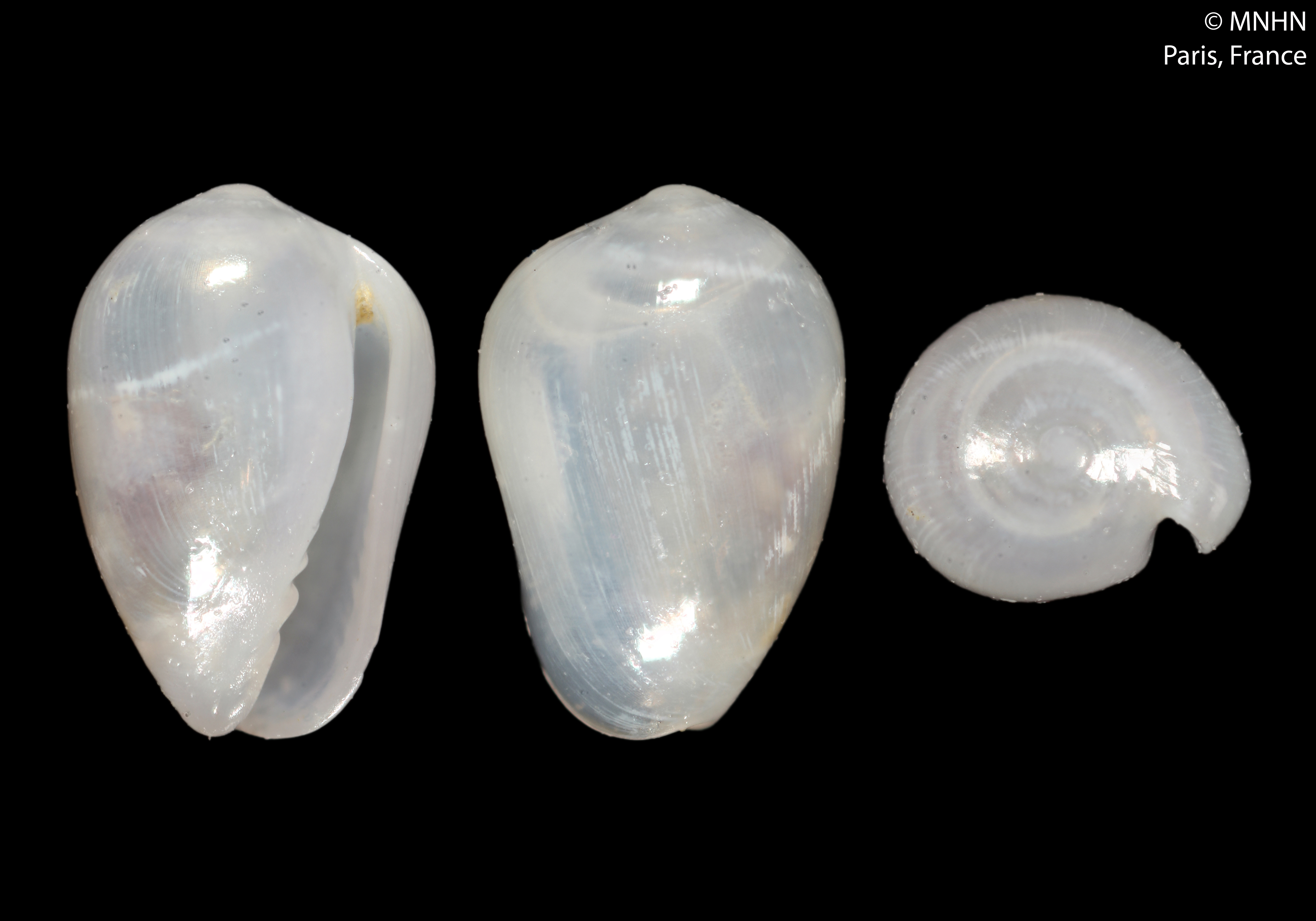
- Shell of Gibberula hendricksae (holotype at MNHN, Paris)

Scientific classification
- Kingdom: Animalia
- Phylum: Mollusca
- Class: Gastropoda
- Subclass: Caenogastropoda
- Order: Neogastropoda
- Family: Cystiscidae
- Subfamily: Cystiscinae
- Genus: Gibberula
- Species: G. hendricksae

Binomial name
- Gibberula hendricksae Ortea, 2015

= Gibberula hendricksae =

Species of gastropod

Gibberula hendricksae is a species of sea snail, a marine gastropod mollusk, in the family Cystiscidae. It is named after American opera singer Barbara Hendricks.

== Description ==
The length of the shell attains 2.6 mm.

== Distribution ==
This species occurs off Guadeloupe.
