= Llancaiach Branch =

Former branch railway line in Glamorganshire, Wales

The Llancaiach Branch railway line was a mineral branch line in Glamorganshire, South Wales. It was authorised by the Taff Vale Railway Act 1836 (6 & 7 Will. 4. c. lxxxii) as part of the Taff Vale Railway, and its purpose was to connect collieries at Llancaiach and bring their output to Cardiff for onward shipment. It was designed by Isambard Kingdom Brunel and built on the standard gauge. It opened in 1841 from a junction (later known as Stormstown Junction) with the Merthyr line immediately south of Abercynon (then called Navigation House). It was intended to be horse worked, and included a self-acting rope-worked inclined plane near the junction. The collieries were slow to use the line, preferring their customary use of a tramroad and the Glamorganshire Canal, and the value of the line was diminished when the Taff Vale Extension line, an east-west connecting line belonging to the Newport, Abergavenny and Hereford Railway, intersected it and cut off the colliery connections, and the line became dormant.

In 1878 the Taff Vale Railway tried to reinvigorate the line by building a line by-passing the inclined plane, with the intention of connecting with new collieries at the north end, but access over the Taff Vale Extension line was refused.

In 1884 a new connection from Pont Shon Norton, immediately north of Pontypridd, to Albion Colliery on the east side of the River Taff was opened, and in 1900 this line was extended north to join the Llancaiach line. A passenger train service operated through from Pontypridd to Nelson station, just short of the Taff Vale Extension line, but access to that line was still problematic.

The passenger service was popular at first, but it was discontinued in 1932, and as the coal industry declined, the branch was successively cut back, finally closing completely in 1970.

== Early transport systems ==
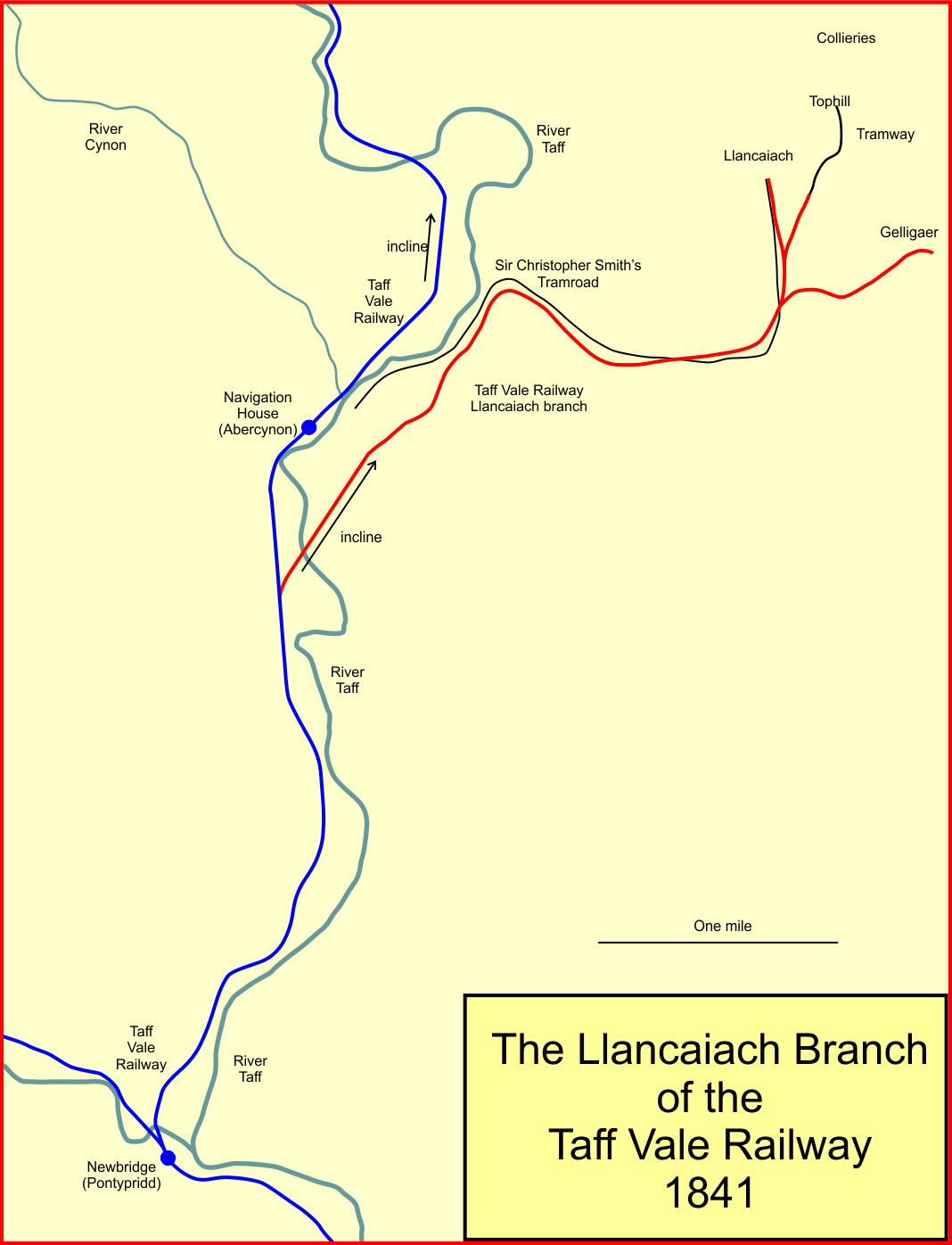
The Llancaiach branch line

Colliery working near Llancaiach had been in operation since the end of the eighteenth century. The work was hampered by the difficulty of getting the output of the mines to market, as the roads in the district were primitive and unsatisfactory. This was eased a little when the Glamorganshire Canal opened fully in 1794. Its authorising act of Parliament, the Glamorganshire Canal Act 1790 (30 Geo. 3. c. 82), included a "four mile clause" which permitted any mine operator within four miles of the canal to construct a mineral tramroad from their mine to the canal, across the land of third parties if necessary, without further legal formality.

The proprietor of Llanfabon Colliery, near Nelson, constructed such a tramroad to the canal at Navigation House (Abercynon); this was in operation before 1812. It was known as Sir Christopher Smith's tramroad.

== The Taff Vale Railway ==
The Taff Vale Railway was authorised by the Taff Vale Railway Act 1836 (6 & 7 Will. 4. c. lxxxii). Its main purpose was the conveyance of the products of the iron-making industry in Merthyr and Dowlais, to the docks at Cardiff for onward transport by sea. In addition, several connections to collieries were planned, including pits at Llancaiach, and passenger transport was also authorised. The line was engineered by Isambard Kingdom Brunel, but it was to be on the standard gauge.

The first main line of the Taff Vale Railway, between Merthyr and Cardiff, was opened on 9 October 1840, and by that time the emphasis there had been a significant change of emphasis. The potential of the district for coal extraction had become clear: iron was still important, but the main traffic was now seen as the movement of coal from existing and new collieries, to Cardiff and to the ironworks. The first main line included a rope-worked incline near Quaker's Yard: to overcome a large and sudden ascent there, a length of double track was installed together with a stationary steam engine, and passing trains were hauled up and let down on a rope. The times of the trains were arranged so as to pass up and down at the same time, to some extent balancing the load.

== The first Llancaiach branch ==
The authorised Llancaiach branch was being constructed at the same time. The branch was to leave the main line by a junction, "Llancaiach Branch Junction", between Pontypridd and Abercynon, (Note: The locations were known to the railway as Newbridge and Navigation House at first.) and to climb by an inclined plane to reach high ground. The gradient was 1 in 8 and the length was 600 yards. As the dominant business was to be the bringing down of coal, the inclined plane was on the balanced system, whereby loaded coal wagons were to descend by gravity, hauling lighter empty wagons up in the process, without the application of a separate power supply. The line was engineered so that the remainder of the branch was practically level, enabling horse traction to handle the loads. From the head of the inclined plane it followed a similar course to that of the earlier tramroad.

On 22 October 1841 the Taff Vale Railway board decided it would shortly be ready for opening. It gave notice to the Board of Trade, which inspected new lines prior to opening for passenger operation, but the BoT informed the TVR that as passenger operation was not contemplated on the Llancaiach branch, no inspection was necessary. The line probably opened in November 1841.

The new line attracted almost no business at first. The mine owners near Llancaiach continued to send their coal to Cardiff over Smith's tramroad and the canal, although that required physical transshipment at the canal wharf; the Taff Vale charges were stated to be too high. Duncan & Co.'s colliery at Llancaiach started to use the line from 30 June 1842 and in 1843 more traffic was sent by the railway.

== The Taff Vale Extension Railway ==
The Newport, Abergavenny and Hereford Railway was authorised in 1846 to build a line between those places, and in 1847 it obtained authority to build a westward line from Pontypool to reach the Taff Vale Railway at Quaker's Yard. This line, belonging to the NA&HR, was called the Taff Vale Extension Railway. It crossed several of the South Wales Valleys in the course of its route, eventually making a connection with the railways in many of the valleys.

The Taff Vale Extension opened through to Quaker's Yard on 5 January 1858. Running east to west on the high ground at Llancaiach, intersected the northern extremity of the TVR's Llancaiach branch, which branched into three just south of this point, serving also the Gelligaer and Tophill collieries there. The Taff Vale Extension line provided a passenger station at Llancaiach. The collieries also had a connection into the Taff Vale Extension line, and it became possible to bring out Llancaiach coal through Quaker's Yard, avoiding the rope worked inclined plane on the branch. Traffic had increased considerably on the branch by this time, and serious congestion was being experienced.

== Formalising the Llancaiach connection ==
The intersection at Llancaiach and the relationship between the Taff Vale Railway and the Extension line seems not to have been formalised. The Newport, Abergavenny and Hereford Railway was formed into the West Midland Railway in 1860, and that company amalgamated so as to join the Great Western Railway in 1863, so that the GWR was now the owner of the Taff Vale Extension line. As time had passed, the coal traffic had further increased and in 1867 it was felt to be time to modernise the arrangements. The Great Western Railway (Various Powers) Act 1867 (30 & 31 Vict. c. cl) gave structure to the connection at Llancaiach, and formalised the running powers of the TVR into Quaker's Yard. The TVR was given the right to require a junction between the two systems at Llancaiach.

This led to discussions between the two companies, at which it was agreed that a proper junction would be provided at Llancaiach, and that the GWR would provide proper sidings on the north side of the Extension line for the colliery traffic. For ordinary goods traffic, the GWR would use the TVR goods station on the south side of their line. As the TVR would now take all the colliery traffic out via Quaker's Yard, the three level crossings by which the collieries were accessed from the TVR line would be abolished.

The new arrangements started on 3 March 1870, and the whole of the Llancaiach branch, with the exception of the stub at Llancaiach now used by the GWR, was taken out of use.

== The Taff Bargoed Joint Line ==
After much rivalry in securing authority for the line, the Rhymney Railway and the Great Western Railway agreed to sponsor jointly a line from Llancaiach to Dowlais, to get access to the thriving iron and steel works there. The line was authorised by the Great Western Railway (Various Powers) Act 1867 (30 & 31 Vict. c. cl) on 15 July 1867, and was known as the Taff Bargoed Joint Line. (Note: "Taff Bargoed". The watercourse that it followed is shown on Ordnance Survey maps as Bargoed Taf, and Chapman consistently refers to the line as the Bargoed Taff line, but abbreviates it to "TBJR".) The authorising act of Parliament gave the Taff Vale Railway running powers over it. The TVR already had access to Dowlais ironworks, but this was over the Dowlais Railway, which had an obsolescent rope worked incline. The Taff Bargoed line opened to goods and mineral traffic on 10 January 1876, and to passengers on 1 February 1876, although the intervening terrain was very thinly populated.

== The second Llancaiach branch ==
As the Taff Bargoed line neared completion, the TVR considered what use might be made of it. It started from Llancaiach, but the TVR branch to that place had long since been out of use, and access to it was over the Taff Vale Extension line from Quaker's Yard. The TVR decided on the construction of a new branch to Llancaiach, and obtained the Taff Vale Railway Act 1873 (36 & 37 Vict. c. clviii) giving authorisation on 21 July 1873. The earlier line was still extant, although disused. The new powers were to build a deviation on it to pass the old inclined plane; and to confirm the making of the junction at Llancaiach with the GWR Taff Vale Extension line, and also to make a new east-facing junction there.

== Opening, and a dispute ==
After a delayed start, the line was said to be ready on 18 July 1878, but the GWR had not yet made the junction connection at Llancaiach. The east curve there had been laid in, but its junction with the GWR was also not formed. The TVR seems to have acquiesced in leaving the east curve unused: it had no running powers eastward; it removed most of the track and the east curve was never opened.

The TVR informed the GWR that it intended to use its running powers over the joint line from 1 September 1878, but Dowlais as an objective seems to have reduced in priority: the TVR's own connection to the Dowlais Railway was still in existence. The priority now was access to the Navigation Colliery at Treharris, and traffic from the Taff Bargoed line itself, as well as the collieries at Llancaiach. The GWR disputed the use of the running powers to get access to Navigation Colliery: the running powers were to get access to the Taff Bargoed line, not to serve intermediate locations.

This led to an impasse, and the line was not used; the situation remained until the Dowlais Iron Company was sinking new pits at Aberdare Junction (Abercynon) and desired to send construction materials there from Dowlais. The GWR conveyed them to Llancaiach and the TVR took them on from there from November 1889, the first regular use of the Llancaiach branch for 19 years. From 1890 some traffic was brought down from the Llancaiach colliery, on the north side of the line; the TVR had to pay the GWR a toll to cross the Taff Vale Extension line. The volume of traffic was not great.

== The Pont Shon Norton branch ==
The TVR submitted a bill in the 1879 session for what became known as the Pont Shon Norton branch. It was a new line from a junction not far north of Pontypridd, crossing immediately to the east side of the River Taff and running north, and connecting with the Llancaiach branch not far from Stormstown. New pits were being explored in the area to be served and they promised good production; moreover the TVR saw this as a defensive move to keep competitors away from those pits and indeed to discourage the construction of a through line to points further north. This line was authorised by Taff Vale Railway Act 1879 (42 & 43 Vict. c. cxxxix) of 21 July 1879, but only as far as Cilfynydd Inn.

Having obtained the act, and apparently kept out interlopers, the TVR was very slow to actually build the line, as the pits to be served were not yet productive, but it seems to have been opened in 1884. (Note: According to Chapman; Barrie and Baughan say 1887, page 152.) In 1896 the TVR submitted a fresh bill to extend from Cilfynydd Inn to join the Llancaiach line, as earlier intended, at Ynysydwr Junction. This was authorised by the Taff Vale Railway Act 1896 (59 & 60 Vict. c. ccxxxiii) of 7 August 1896, and opened in 1900.

== Passenger services ==
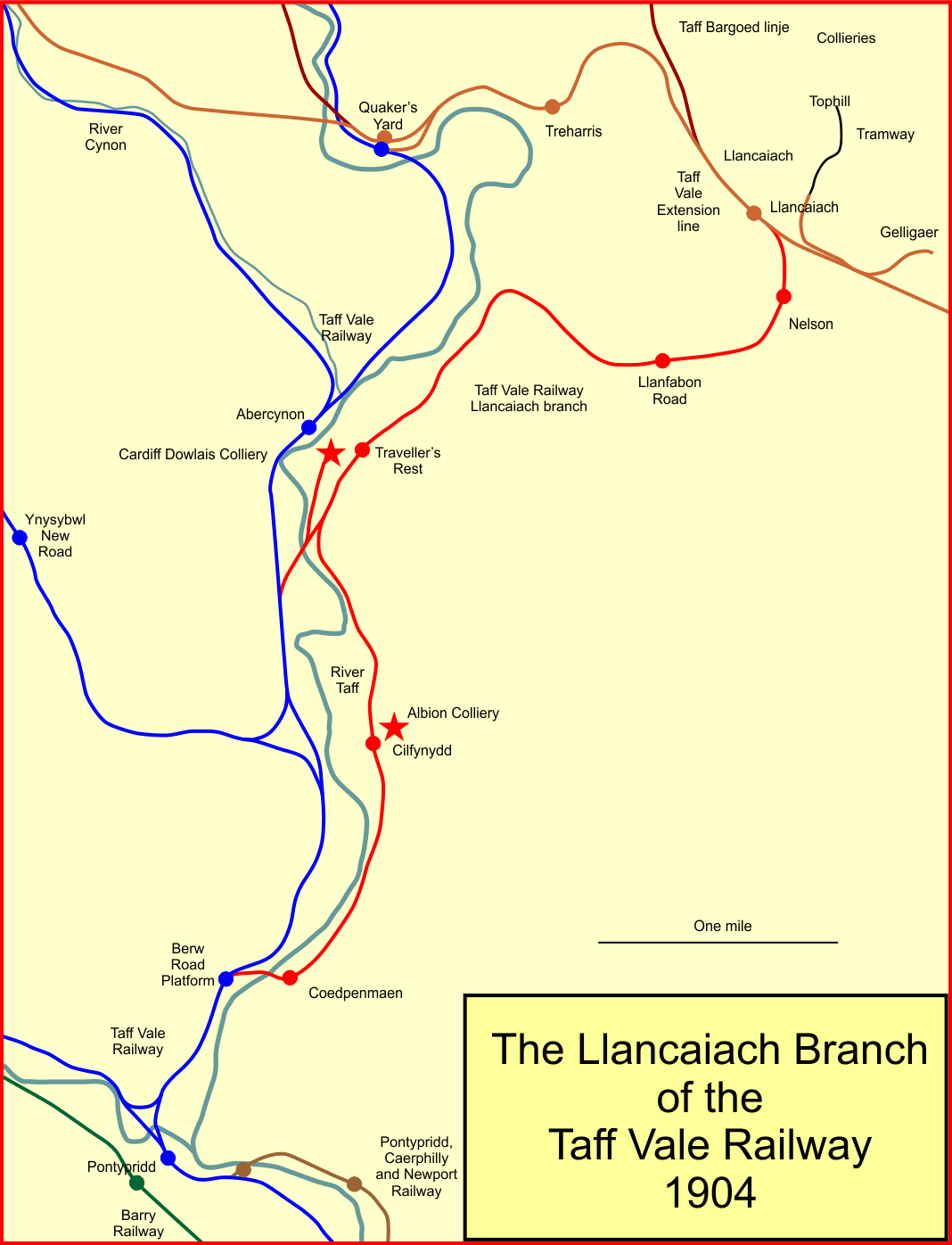
The Llancaiach branch line in 1900

With the development of the collieries at Cilfynydd, it was clear that a large population of miners and their families would be resident, and a passenger service began to be considered. After passage of the Taff Vale Railway Act 1896, the TVR negotiated with the GWR over the use of the GWR station at Llancaiach, but these talks were not fruitful, and the TVR decided to make Nelson, just short of the Taff Vale Extension line, their northern terminus. The opportunity was taken to make considerable improvements to Pont Shon Norton Junction, for passenger operation on the branch and also to provide relief to the congestion at Pontypridd station. These works were ready in 1900, and passenger traffic started on 1 June 1900. Stations northward from Pontypridd, were Coedpenmaen, Cilfynydd and Nelson. The Nelson station was just short of the junction with the Taff Vale Extension line, and was still in use by the GWR as a goods station. A further station, for the use of miners at Dowlais-Cardiff Colliery, was provided at Travellers Rest, opening on 18 March 1901.

In 1903 the TVR experimented with what it referred to as "motor cars": railmotors, that is single passenger coaches with a small integrated steam engine. Although a crew of three was required, these motor cars enabled a frequent service to be run, calling at low-cost stopping places with minimal facilities. After experimentation on the Penarth branch in 1903, it was decided to introduce the system more widely: platform level access was decided upon, the alternative of using retractable steps on the motor car to access ground level accommodation having been decided against. On 10 October 1904 a motor car service was introduced on the Nelson line; a new "platform" was opened at Llanfabon Road (Abernant). The platforms were 40 feet long and did not have any shelter. Llanfabon Road platform was extended in 1906, revealing that if there were conventional trains operating, the short motor car platforms were not adequate.

Berw Road Platform had been located on the main line, but a replacement Berw Road stopping place, suitable for motor cars, was opened on the Nelson line in July 1908.

The introduction of passenger tramcars operating out of Pontypridd provided serious competition for the motor car service, and usage of Cilfynydd station declined steeply; it was closed on 1 June 1915.

== Nelson and Llancaiach station ==
On 5 August 1912 the GWR opened a new, larger station called Nelson & Llancaiach, a little west of Llancaiach station; they transferred their goods facilities from Nelson TVR to the new station and they closed their own Llancaiach station.

== From 1923 ==
The Government passed the Railways Act 1921, which forced the consolidation of most of the railways of Great Britain into four new, large companies, the "groups". Although this is generally considered to have taken place at the beginning of 1923, the Taff Vale Railway became a constituent of the Great Western Railway on 1 January 1922. The process was known as "the grouping".

During this period competition from road transport, especially for passenger business, became exceptionally strong and passenger carryings on the railway fell considerably. Steel making ceased at Dowlais in 1930, making further inroads into both passenger traffic (as the community depopulated) and mineral carryings. The decline was considered irreversible and the GWR closed the Pontypridd to Nelson passenger service from 12 September 1932. The line north of Albion Colliery at Cilfynydd was closed completely at the same time.

At Stormstown Junction, the stub of line to Dowlais-Cardiff Colliery was retained. Albion Colliery closed on 2 September 1966, and after removal of surface stocks, the line closed on 14 November 1970.

== Topography ==
=== Llancaiach branch ===
- [Nelson & Llancaiach]; GWR station on Taff Vale Extension and Vale of Neath connection;
- Nelson; opened June 1900; closed 12 September 1932;
- Llanfabon Road Platform; opened 10 October 1904; renamed Llanfabon Road Halt 1922; closed 12 September 1932;
- Traveller's Rest; opened 18 March 1901; renamed Traveller's Rest Abercynon Upper 1924; (Note: According to Chapman, and also Butt; Quick has this reversed, that is, TRAC until 1924, then TR. Hutton says it was simply Upper Abercynon at first, from 1 May 1901.) closed 12 September 1932;
- Ynysydwr Junction;
- Llancaiach Branch Junction; convergence with main line, Merthyr to Pontypridd.

=== Pont Shon Norton Branch ===
- Ynysydwr Junction (above);
- Cilfynydd; opened 1 June 1900; closed 12 September 1932;
- Coedpenmaen; opened 1 June 1900; closed 1 June 1915;
- Berw Road Platform; opened July 1908; renamed Berw Road Halt 2 October 1922; closed 12 September 1932;
- Pont Shon Norton Junction; convergence with main line, Merthyr to Pontypridd.
