= Stanley Powell =

Wales international rugby league footballer

Personal information
- Full name: Stanley J. Powell
- Born: 19 July 1916; Risca, Wales
- Died: 3 January 1995 (aged 78); Southport, England

Playing information

Rugby union
- Position: Backs
Club
Years	Team	Pld	T	G	FG	P
≤1935–≤35	Cilfynydd RFC

Rugby league
- Position: Fullback, Wing, Centre, Stand-off, Scrum-half
Club
Years	Team	Pld	T	G	FG	P
1935–46	St. Helens	194	45	320		775
1940–41(guest)	→Oldham	1	1	0	0	3
1946–47	Belle Vue Rangers
1947–49	Warrington	29	5	0	21	57
1949–51	Castleford	11	1	0	0	3
≤1951–≥52	Belle Vue Rangers
	Total	235	52	320	21	838
Representative
Years	Team	Pld	T	G	FG	P
1945–47	Wales	2

Stanley J. Powell (19 July 1916 – 3 January 1995) was a Welsh rugby union, and professional rugby league footballer who played in the 1930s, 1940s and 1950s. He played club level rugby union (RU) for Cilfynydd RFC in the backs, and representative level rugby league (RL) for Wales and Lancashire, and at club level for St. Helens, Castleford, Oldham RLFC (wartime guest), Belle Vue Rangers (two spells), and Warrington, as a fullback, wing, centre, stand-off, or scrum-half.

== Background ==
Stan Powell was born in Risca, Wales, he died aged 78 in Southport, Merseyside.

== Playing career ==
=== International honours ===
Powell won caps for Wales (RL) while at St. Helens against England at Central Park, Wigan during March 1945, and while at Warrington in 1947.

=== Championship final appearances ===
Stan Powell played on the wing in Warrington's 15-5 victory over Bradford Northern in the Championship Final during the 1947–48 season at Maine Road, Manchester.
