= David Lloyd Jones, Lord Lloyd-Jones =

British judge (born 1952)

The Right Honourable Lord Lloyd-Jones PC FLSW
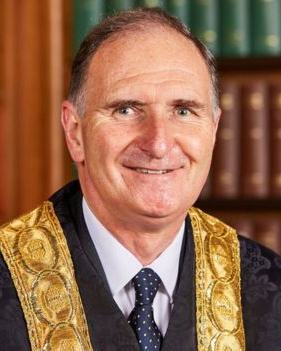

Justice of the Supreme Court of the United Kingdom
- Incumbent
- Assumed office 30 August 2022
- Nominated by: Dominic Raab
- Appointed by: Elizabeth II
- Preceded by: Himself
- In office 2 October 2017 – 13 January 2022
- Nominated by: David Lidington
- Appointed by: Elizabeth II
- Preceded by: The Lord Clarke of Stone-cum-Ebony
- Succeeded by: Himself

Lord Justice of Appeal
- In office 1 October 2012 – 1 October 2017

Personal details
- Born: 13 January 1952 (age 74)
- Education: Pontypridd Boys' Grammar School
- Alma mater: Downing College, Cambridge

David Lloyd Jones, Lord Lloyd-Jones, PC, FLSW (born 13 January 1952) is a British judge and legal scholar. He has served as a Justice of the Supreme Court of the United Kingdom since 2017, and has also served as a member of the Court of Appeal of England and Wales and as a chairman of the Law Commission prior to joining the Supreme Court.

== Early life ==
Lloyd Jones was born on 13 January 1952, in Church Village, near Pontypridd, to William Elwyn Jones and Annie Blodwen Jones (née Lloyd-Jones). He was educated at Pontypridd Boys' Grammar School. He studied law at Downing College, Cambridge, graduating with a first class Bachelor of Arts (BA) degree, later promoted to a Master of Arts (MA Cantab) degree, and a first class Bachelor of Laws (LLB) degree (since renamed by Cambridge to the LLM).

== Career ==
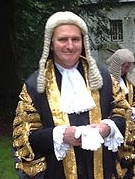
Lloyd-Jones in procession at Llandaff Cathedral in 2013

=== Academic career ===
Lloyd Jones was a Fellow of Downing College, Cambridge from 1975 to 1991. From 1999 to 2005, he was a visiting professor at City University, London. He has written articles that have been published in a number of academic journals specialising in law.

=== Legal career ===
Lloyd Jones was called to the bar in 1975 (Middle Temple). He became a recorder in 1994 and served as a junior Crown Counsel (Common Law) from 1997 to 1999. Lloyd Jones became a Queen's Counsel in 1999.

On 3 October 2005, he was appointed as a High Court judge, and was assigned to the Queen's Bench Division. He served as presiding judge on the Wales and Chester Circuit and chairman of the Lord Chancellor's Standing Committee on the Welsh Language from 2008 to 2011. On 1 October 2012, Lloyd Jones was appointed a Lord Justice of Appeal, and was appointed to the Privy Council on 7 November 2012.

On 2 October 2017 Lloyd Jones was appointed a Justice of the Supreme Court of the United Kingdom, where he chose the judicial courtesy title of Lord Lloyd-Jones. He retired on 13 January 2022 upon attaining 70 years of age, the last justice so to retire before the retirement age was raised to 75. He then became a member of the supplementary panel.

On 17 August 2022, after the mandatory retirement age changed to 75, it was announced that Lloyd-Jones had been reappointed to the Supreme Court.

He was Treasurer of Middle Temple for 2023.

== Honours ==
In 2005, upon being appointed a High Court judge, he received the customary appointment of Knight Bachelor. On 14 February 2006, he was knighted at Buckingham Palace by Queen Elizabeth II.

He was made an Honorary Fellow of Aberystwyth University in 2012. He was awarded an honorary degree by Swansea University in 2014. In 2016, he was elected a Fellow of the Learned Society of Wales (FLSW).

== Personal life ==
He married Annmarie Harris in 1983, and has one son and one daughter.

== See also ==
- List of judges of the Supreme Court of the United Kingdom
