= Inge Borkh =

German opera singer (1921–2018)

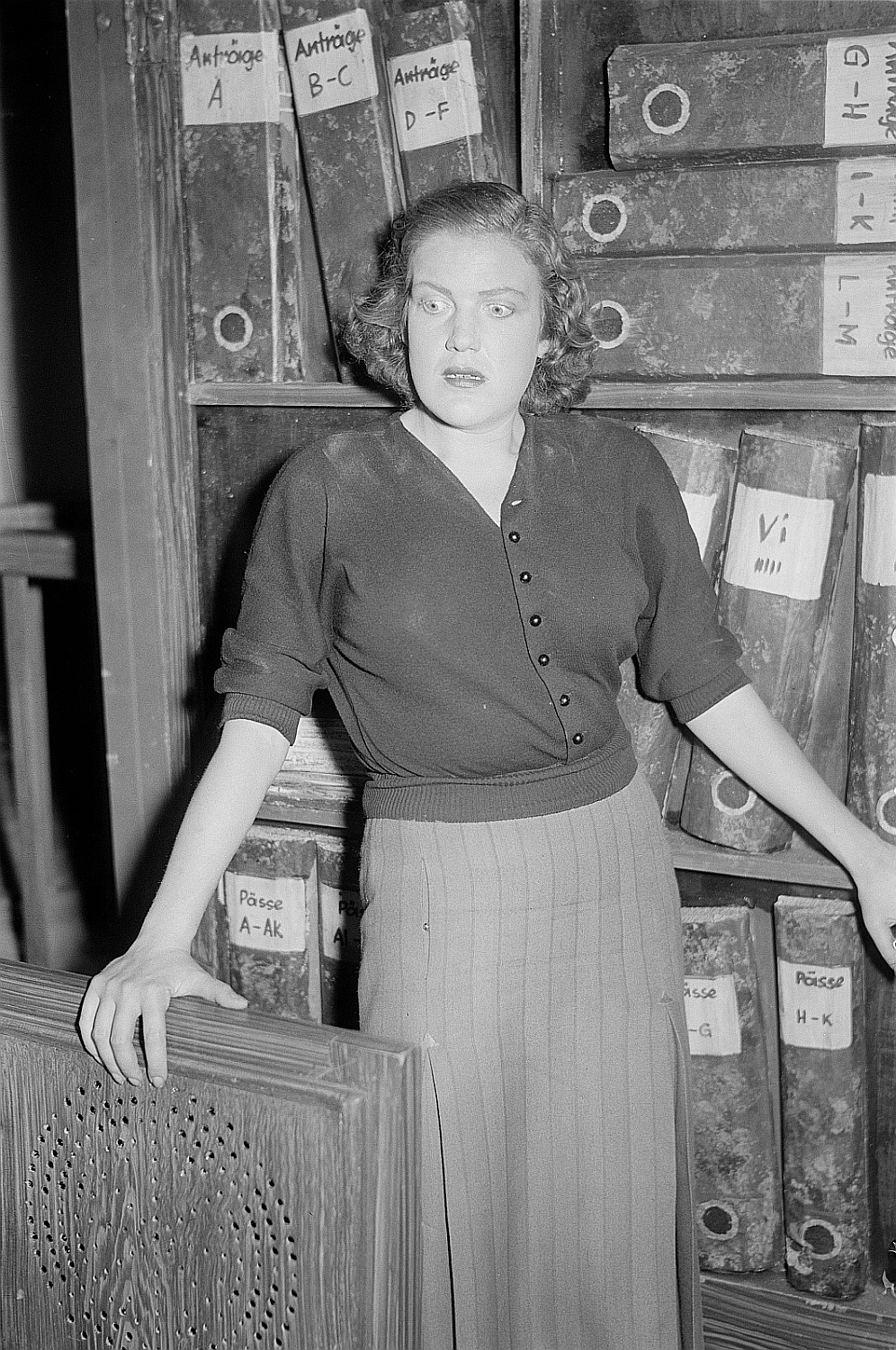
- Borkh as Magda in Menotti's Der Konsul, Berlin, 1951 photo by Avraham Pisarek
- Born: Ingeborg Simon; 26 May 1921; Mannheim, Republic of Baden, German Republic
- Died: 26 August 2018 (aged 97); Stuttgart, Baden-Württemberg, Germany
- Education: Max Reinhardt Seminar; Mozarteum
- Occupations: Actress; Dramatic soprano
- Organizations: Deutsche Oper Berlin; Bavarian State Opera
- Spouses: Robert Lenz (m. 1947) Alexander Welitsch (m. 1951; died 1991)
- Awards: Hans-Reinhart-Ring

Inge Borkh (born Ingeborg Simon, 26 May 1921 (Note: Several sources give 1917 as the birth year, but Borkh was insistent that the year was 1921: "One dictionary got it wrong at the beginning, and then everyone printed the mistake. It made my poor mother crazy.") – 26 August 2018) was a German operatic dramatic soprano. She was first based in Switzerland, where she received international attention when she appeared in the first performance in German of Menotti's The Consul, in Basel, in 1951. In 1952, Borkh became a member of the Deutsche Oper Berlin and the Bavarian State Opera in Munich. She appeared at leading opera houses in Europe and the Americas, and at festivals such as Bayreuth and Salzburg. Trained first as an actress, she was admired for both singing and stage presence, especially in the Richard Strauss roles of Salome and Elektra. She also performed in contemporary opera, such as the premiere of Josef Tal's Ashmedai at the Hamburg State Opera in 1971. Her recordings include complete operas and recitals. Borkh was awarded the Hans-Reinhart-Ring, the highest honour for theatre professionals in Switzerland.

== Early life and education ==
Borkh was born Ingeborg Simon in Mannheim in 1921. Some sources, including Oxford Music Online, give her year of birth as 1917. Her father, a diplomat, was Jewish. The family left Germany in 1933 and moved to Austria. She trained to be an actress at the Max Reinhardt Seminar in Vienna and also had some dance training, both of which served her well in opera, as she became known both for her voice and for her dramatic intensity. She appeared at the Burgtheater in Vienna while still studying. Borkh worked as an actress, first at the Landestheater Linz in Austria from 1937. The family moved to Switzerland in 1938, where she was engaged by the Theater Basel.

== Career ==
Borkh studied voice in Milan, Italy, with Vittorio Moratti and later at the Salzburg Mozarteum, and made her operatic debut in 1940, in Lucerne as Czipra in the operetta Der Zigeunerbaron by Johann Strauss, now under her stage name Inge Borkh. She then appeared as Agathe in Weber's Der Freischütz. She remained in Switzerland throughout World War II, performing in Basel, Lucerne and Zürich. In 1951 she sang the role of Magda in the first German-language performance of Menotti's The Consul in Basel, leading to international recognition. From 1952 she was a member of the Deutsche Oper Berlin and the Bavarian State Opera in Munich, having appeared at both houses as a guest from 1950. Also in 1952, she appeared at the Bayreuth Festival, as Freia in Wagner's Das Rheingold and as Sieglinde in his Die Walküre. In the same year she performed at the Edinburgh Festival in the Hamburg State Opera's production of Beethoven's Fidelio, as Leonore, with Lisa Della Casa as Marzelline. The music critic of The Times wrote, "Mme. Inge Borkh is splendid: in figure and dress she has more verisimilitude than most sopranos can command … she sings with freedom and ardour; she is Beethoven's idea incarnate". After this Borkh performed at major opera houses in Europe, in Hamburg, Stuttgart, Barcelona, Lisbon, London, Milan and Naples, among others. She made her U.S. debut with the San Francisco Opera on 25 September 1953 in the title role of Elektra by Richard Strauss at the War Memorial Opera House, conducted by Georg Solti, who was also making his American debut. Her association with San Francisco gave her particular pleasure: "I sang almost everything there that I could do. Even Lady Macbeth and Turandot. I wasn't typecast, as I was in other places. Here I even committed the crime of portraying the gentle Elsa in Lohengrin. I went home with my husband afterwards and wept. It was grisly. It was awful. I sang terribly. Yet a critic wrote that it was fabulous, that a new Flagstad had been found. I never attempted that again."

In 1954, Borkh appeared in Rio de Janeiro; in the same year she performed at the Florence Maggio Musicale as Eglantine in Weber's Euryanthe, conducted by Carlo Maria Giulini, and in 1955 at the Salzburg Festival, as Cathleen in the premiere of Egk's Irische Legende. She was Elektra there in 1957, conducted by Dimitri Mitropoulos, and appeared as Klytaemnestra in Gluck's Iphigenie in Aulis in 1962 and 1963. In 1956 she played the role of Queen Elizabeth in the American premiere of Britten's Gloriana, conducted by Josef Krips, who along with Fritz Reiner was one of her favourite conductors.

Borkh's debut at the Metropolitan Opera, New York, was in 1958. It would have been earlier, but the manager of the house, Rudolf Bing, wanted her to play the title role in Salome, which she repeatedly declined to do. She felt as though in that house the role belonged to her contemporary, Ljuba Welitsch. Borkh finally accepted Bing's invitation, and played Salome, with Mitropoulos conducting. In the same season she played Sieglinde, and in 1971 she alternated with Christa Ludwig as the Dyer's Wife in Die Frau ohne Schatten. She made a total of 22 appearances with the company. Her Covent Garden debut was in 1959 in Salome, conducted by Rudolf Kempe; her only other appearances there were in 1967 as the Dyer's Wife, conducted by Solti. New roles in 1962 included appearances in Louise Talma's The Alcestiad at the Frankfurt Opera and in the premiere of Josef Tal's Ashmedai at the Hamburg State Opera in 1971, conducted by Gary Bertini.

In a retrospective study of her career published in Opera News in 2001, the critic Martin Bernheimer wrote:

Even when portraying monstrous heroism, lust or misery, she somehow managed to exude the quality we used to label femininity, not to mention generosity and an innate humanity. One sensed a certain frailty beneath her bravado. Emotional intensity was her specialty, yet she never confused it with hysteria. Exaggeration was not her style. And her voice? It's hard to remember that wonderful voice without recalling her face. Both were vibrant, luminous, sensuous. Both were used aggressively yet gracefully in pursuit of honest communication. Borkh did not deal in clichés.

Borkh retired from opera in 1973 after seven performances of Elektra in Italy. She was awarded the Hans-Reinhart-Ring, the highest Swiss honour for theatre professionals. She briefly returned to the theatre as an actress and for a while turned chanteuse in a cabaret act.

== Recordings ==
Only one of Borkh's performances was recorded on film, the Dyer's Wife in Munich, but there are audio recordings of some of her performances. Both complete works as well as excerpts from a wide array of performances were made available on CD. The complete works include Egk's Irische Legende, Gluck's Iphigénie, and Salome and Elektra, both conducted by Mitropoulos. She also recorded Elektra in 1960 with the Staatskapelle Dresden chorus and orchestra, conducted by Karl Böhm (Deutsche Grammophon 445 329-2). She appeared in further complete recordings of Orff's Antigonae, conducted by Ferdinand Leitner, Cherubini's Médée conducted by Vittorio Gui, Die Frau ohne Schatten in 1963, conducted by Joseph Keilberth, and the 1952 performances from the Bayreuth Festival, Das Rheingold and Die Walküre, also conducted by Keilberth. The complete Turandot was recorded for Decca, conducted by Alberto Erede, alongside Mario del Monaco, Renata Tebaldi and Nicola Zaccaria.

Borkh can be heard on CD performing Scenes from Elektra and Salome, conducted by Reiner in the 1950s (RCA Victor 09026 68636-2). For Decca she recorded an Operatic Recital in which she sang mostly arias from Italian operas. She took part in a 1961 recording of Beethoven's symphonies with the Royal Philharmonic Orchestra, conducted by René Leibowitz, performing the soprano solo in the Ninth alongside Ruth Siewert, Richard Lewis and Ludwig Weber. In 1965 she recorded the role of Tove in Schoenberg's Gurre-Lieder, conducted by Rafael Kubelík, for Deutsche Grammophon.

== Personal life ==
Borkh was married twice; her second husband was the baritone Alexander Welitsch (1906–1991). (Note: It amused Borkh that the Met "unwittingly acquired another Frau Welitsch with seven veils" as Salome. Her husband was not related to her predecessor in the role, Ljuba Welitsch.)

Inge Borkh died in Stuttgart on 26 August 2018.
