= John Hopkins (legal scholar) =

English legal academic (1936–2018)

John Alan Hopkins
- Born: 16 December 1936; Hemsworth, England
- Died: 19 September 2018 (aged 81)
- Occupation: Professor of law

Academic background
- Education: Queens' College, Cambridge

Academic work
- Discipline: Lawyer
- Institutions: Downing College, Cambridge; Hughes Hall, Cambridge

John Alan Hopkins (16 December 1936 – 19 September 2018) was an English legal academic known for developing Downing College's reputation for law. He was a Fellow of Downing College, Cambridge and an Honorary Fellow of Hughes Hall, Cambridge.

== Early education and career ==
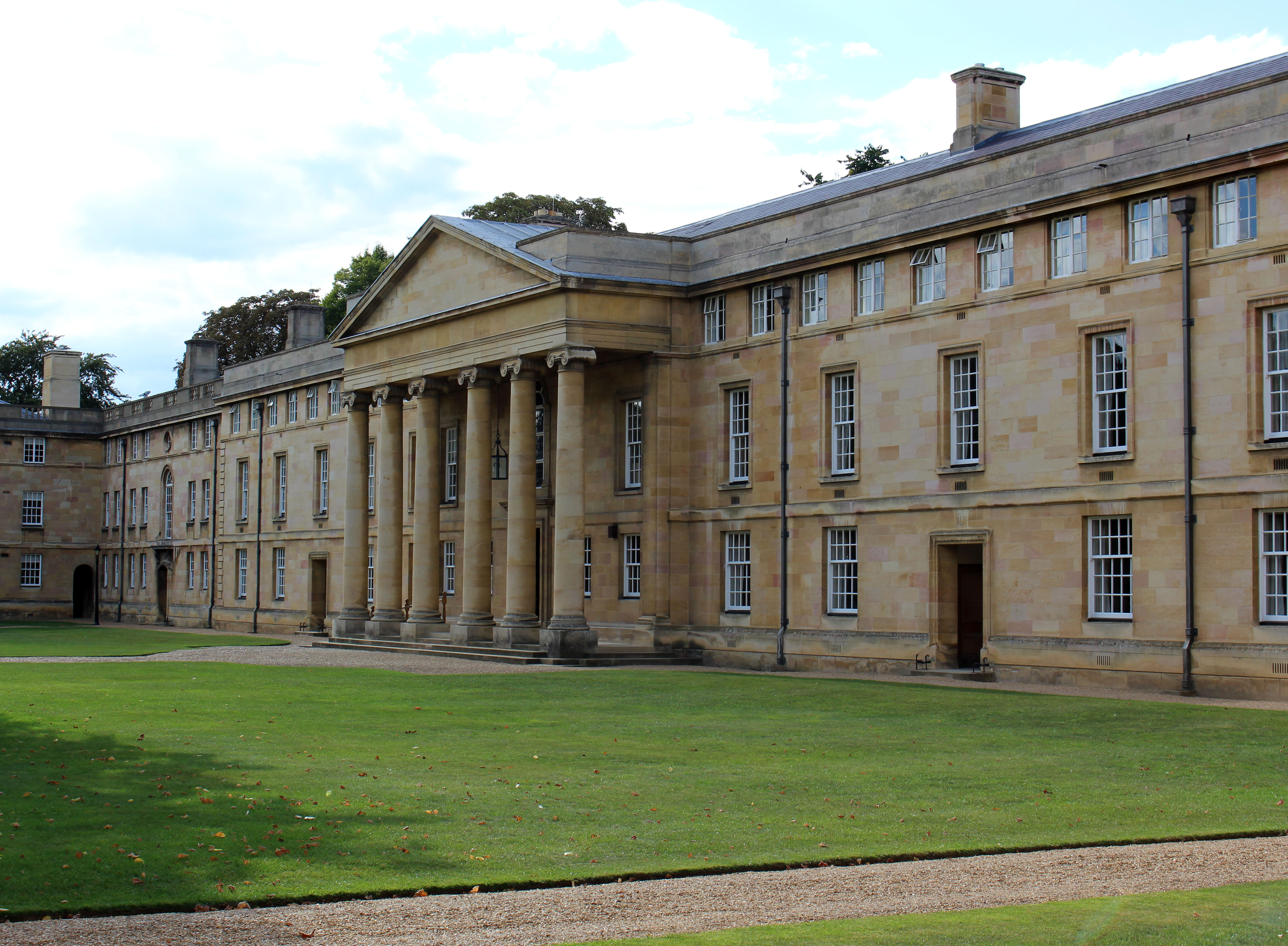
Downing College, Cambridge, where Hopkins spent the bulk of his academic career

John Hopkins was born at Hemsworth (Yorkshire) and relocated to Pontypridd when he was 12. He attended Pontypridd Boys' Grammar School and then read law at Queens' College, Cambridge. He was awarded his B.A. in 1960, and his LLB the following year, accompanied by the Whewell Scholarship in International Law. He was elected to a fellowship at Downing College in October 1961. He was called to the Bar by Gray's Inn in 1964. Thereafter, he held many positions in college, including Tutor, Senior Tutor and Director of Studies in Law, retiring in 2004. He became, in addition, a visiting professor at City University, London in 1980. In 1981, he was elected Honorary Bencher of Middle Temple, London. He was a governor of Harrow School, Sherborne School, Eastbourne College and Wellington College.

In his capacity as Director of Studies in Law at Downing for over 40 years, and also as a University Lecturer, John Hopkins taught Constitutional, Equity and International law. Following his time at Downing, he was appointed Director of Studies in Law at Hughes Hall, Cambridge.

He had a characteristic style of supervision, delivered with pipe in hand, smoking matches, as the pipe never seemed to light, and banging the pipe on the bottom of his shoe, which has had a widespread influence on generations of lawyers who read law at Cambridge. He taught John Cleese Equity law and suggested that Cleese developed his Ministry of Silly Walks gait in avoiding the puddles in Downing College's court.

The following describes his supervisions perfectly:

The memorable use of "the pipe". John talks. The pipe empty of tobacco, filled from the tin, the waving of the large box of matches, the extraction of the match, the shutting of the box, the box put aside, the pointing with the pipe, the taking up of the box, the striking of the match, the box put aside the lift of pipe and match to the face, the draw – and again and again without result, the extinction of the match with one flick of the wrist, the pipe unlit and so to the repeat – to box, to match, to pipe and on. and with each movement an emphasis, a comment, a question, a pause for reply and a demand for response. All kindly done with twinkle in the eye for such clever of dumb intellects as had presented themselves to his room to be taught. And taught to good effect.

== Awards and honours ==
He was a Master Bencher of Middle Temple, and was an Honorary Bencher since 1982. In 2012, John Hopkins was conferred Honorary Fellowship of Hughes Hall, Cambridge after serving for 8 years as the college's Director of Studies in Law.

== Personal life ==
John Hopkins was a keen member of the Marylebone Cricket Club (MCC) and a stalwart of The Athenaeum.

His marriage to Charity A. "Cherry" Busbridge took place in Abingdon, Oxfordshire in 1964, while she was still a post-graduate research student: it was followed by the births of their two children in 1971 and 1974. Cherry Hopkins is a life fellow and former Director of Studies in law at Girton College, Cambridge.
