= Die Frau ohne Schatten discography =

This is a list of recordings of Die Frau ohne Schatten, a three-act opera by Richard Strauss with a German-language libretto by Hugo von Hofmannsthal. The work was first performed in Vienna on 10 October 1919.

== Recordings ==
Year	Cast (Kaiser, Kaiserin, Barak, Färberin, Amme)	Conductor, Opera house and orchestra	Label
1955	Hans Hopf; Leonie Rysanek; Ludwig Weber; Christel Goltz; Elisabeth Höngen	Karl Böhm; Vienna State Opera orchestra & chorus (recorded live on 9 November)	Audio CD: Orfeo; Cat: C 668 053 D
1955	Hans Hopf; Leonie Rysanek; Paul Schöffler; Christel Goltz; Elisabeth Höngen	Karl Böhm; Vienna Philharmonic orchestra Vienna State Opera chorus (recorded on 29, 30 November and 2, 7, 10 December)	Audio CD: Decca Records; Cat: 425 981-2
1963	Jess Thomas; Ingrid Bjoner; Dietrich Fischer-Dieskau; Inge Borkh; Martha Mödl	Joseph Keilberth; Bavarian State Orchestra (recorded live at National Theatre Munich on 21 November)	Audio CD: Deutsche Grammophon; Cat: 449 584-2
1964	Jess Thomas; Leonie Rysanek; Walter Berry; Christa Ludwig; Grace Hoffman	Herbert von Karajan; Vienna State Opera orchestra & chorus (recorded live on 11 June)	Audio CD: Deutsche Grammophon; Cat: 457 678-2
1964	Jess Thomas; Gundula Janowitz; Otto Wiener; Gladys Kuchta; Grace Hoffman	Herbert von Karajan; Vienna State Opera orchestra & chorus (recorded live on 17 June)	Audio CD: Gala; Cat: GL 100.607
1966	James King; Leonie Rysanek; Walter Berry; Christa Ludwig; Irene Dalis	Karl Böhm; Metropolitan Opera orchestra & chorus (recorded live on 17 December)	Met Opera on Demand
1977	James King; Leonie Rysanek; Walter Berry; Birgit Nilsson; Ruth Hesse	Karl Böhm; Vienna State Opera orchestra & chorus (recorded live on 23 and 27 October)	Audio CD: Deutsche Grammophon; Cat: 445 325-2
1978	James King; Leonie Rysanek; Walter Berry; Ursula Schröder-Feinen; Mignon Dunn	Karl Böhm; Metropolitan Opera orchestra & chorus (recorded live on 1 April)	Met Opera on Demand
1987	René Kollo; Cheryl Studer; Alfred Muff; Ute Vinzing; Hanna Schwarz	Wolfgang Sawallisch; Bavarian Radio Symphony Orchestra (recorded in February, March, November and December)	Audio CD: EMI; Cat: EX 749074-4
1989	Robert Schunk; Johanna Meier; James Courtney; Janis Martin; Helga Dernesch	Christof Perick; Metropolitan Opera orchestra & chorus (recorded live on 9 December)	Met Opera on Demand
1989– 1991	Plácido Domingo; Júlia Várady; José van Dam; Hildegard Behrens; Reinhild Runkel	Georg Solti; Vienna Philharmonic orchestra and Vienna State Opera chorus (recorded in March, April, September, October 1989 and October 1991)	Audio CD: Decca Records; Cat: 436 243-2
1992	Thomas Moser; Cheryl Studer; Robert Hale; Éva Marton; Marjana Lipovšek	Georg Solti; Vienna Philharmonic orchestra Vienna State Opera chorus (recorded live at Salzburg Festival)	DVD Video: Decca; Cat: 071425-9
1996	Ben Heppner; Deborah Voigt; Franz Grundheber; Sabine Haas; Hanna Schwarz	Giuseppe Sinopoli; Staatskapelle Dresden	Audio CD: Teldec; Cat: 0630-13516-2
2002	Thomas Moser; Deborah Voigt; Wolfgang Brendel; Gabriele Schnaut; Reinhild Runkel	Christian Thielemann; Metropolitan Opera orchestra & chorus (recorded live on 5 January)	Met Opera on Demand
2013	Torsten Kerl; Anne Schwanewilms; Johan Reuter; Christine Goerke; Ildikó Komlósi	Vladimir Jurowski; Metropolitan Opera orchestra & chorus (recorded live on 26 November)	Met Opera on Demand
2015	Burkhard Fritz; Tamara Wilson; Terje Stensvold; Sabine Hogrefe; Tanja Ariane Baumgartner	Sebastian Weigle; Frankfurter Opern- und Museumsorchester (recorded live at Oper Frankfurt, October/November 2014)	Audio CD: OEHMS Classic Cat: OV 964
2020	Stephen Gould; Camilla Nylund; Wolfgang Koch; Nina Stemme; Evelyn Herlitzius	Christian Thielemann; Vienna State Opera	Audio CD: Orfeo; Cat: C991203
2024	Issachah Savage; Elza van den Heever; Michael Volle; Lise Lindstrom; Nina Stemme	Yannick Nézet-Séguin; Metropolitan Opera orchestra & chorus (recorded live on 7 December)	Met Opera on Demand
