= Gareth Wood (composer) =

Welsh double-bassist and composer

Gareth Wood (1950 – 2023) was a Welsh double-bassist and composer.

== Early life and education ==
Gareth Wood was born in Cilfynydd, Pontypridd, Wales on 7 June 1950. He attended Pontypridd Boys’ Grammar School and began playing the double bass. When aged just 12 he was performing in Rhondda clubs, playing the guitar with a pop band. He joined the Glamorgan Youth Orchestra as a double-bassist in 1967, and also played in the National Youth Orchestra of Wales.

He then went on to study double bass with John Walton and composition with Dr Frederick T Durrant and Paul Patterson at the Royal Academy of Music. He won there the Lucas Medal for composition and the Eugene Cruft Prize for double bass.

== Career ==
Wood joined the Royal Philharmonic Orchestra as a double-bassist in 1972. He toured extensively with the orchestra, appearing at major festivals and playing under conductors such as Leopold Stokowski, Rudolf Kempe, Karl Böhm, Bernard Haitink and Georg Solti. He served as the chairman of the RPO from 1991 to 1994.

He first achieved recognition as a composer in 1975 when his overture Tombstone, Arizona was performed at the Royal Albert Hall during the National Brass Band Festival. He composed numerous works for brass bands, including a work set for the 1992 European Championships, Five Blooms in a Welsh Garden. He wrote two fanfares for the RPO, one for the concert to mark their 30th birthday, the other for their concert to mark the Silver Jubilee of Queen Elizabeth II. He also composed fanfares to open the National Assembly of Wales (now the Senedd) in Cardiff, the Kravis Center for the Performing Arts in West Palm Beach, Florida, the 150th anniversary of Cunard (performed on the QE2), the launch of the Cardiff Bay Development Corporation, the commencement of the RPO's residency in Nottingham, and to mark Yehudi Menuhin's 80th birthday.

He was commissioned to write numerous other pieces for brass band, including Culloden Moor, for the National Youth Brass Band of Scotland, Introduction and Allegro, (used in the Scandinavian Championship in 1978), Hinemoa (by the New Zealand Band Association for their Centenary Championship in 1980), and The Margam Stone (by West Glamorgan Youth Brass Band). Wood wrote Concertos for Trumpet (for James Watson) and Tuba (for John Fletcher) and a Concertino for E♭ horn as well as a number of solos, some of which are included in the syllabus of the Associated Board and Trinity College of Music. His Songs of Wales has been performed at the annual Last Night of the Welsh Proms at St David's Hall in Cardiff for nearly 25 years.

He taught at the National Centre for Young Bass Players, and composed Light, a dectet for the Centre basses, in 2011.

Wood died in August 2023.

== Notable works ==
Wood's works for wind include:

- Castle Music (Banquet (2006), Nocturnal (2005), Processional (2005))
- The Cauldron
- Concerto for Harp and Brass Band
- Concerto for Trombone and Brass Band
- Concerto No. 2 for Trumpet and Brass Band
- Concerto for Tuba and Brass Band
- Dance Sequence
- Euphonium Concerto (2006)
- Festivities Overture (2006)
- Five Blooms in a Welsh Garden
- Game On! (2005)
- Japanese Slumber Song
- An Ireland Adventure (2007)
- Legends of the Bear (2004)
- March of the Orcs (2005)
- Percussion Concerto (2007)
- Salome (1993/2012)
- Sosban Fach (1873/2006)
- Three Mexican Pictures (1992)
- Tombstone Arizona (Overture)
- Tortilla Wrap (2005)
- A Wiltshire Symphony

Other works include:

- Songs of Wales
- Dectet, for ten double basses
- Poems within a Prayer (song cycle - for Robert Tear)
