= The Hague Jazz =

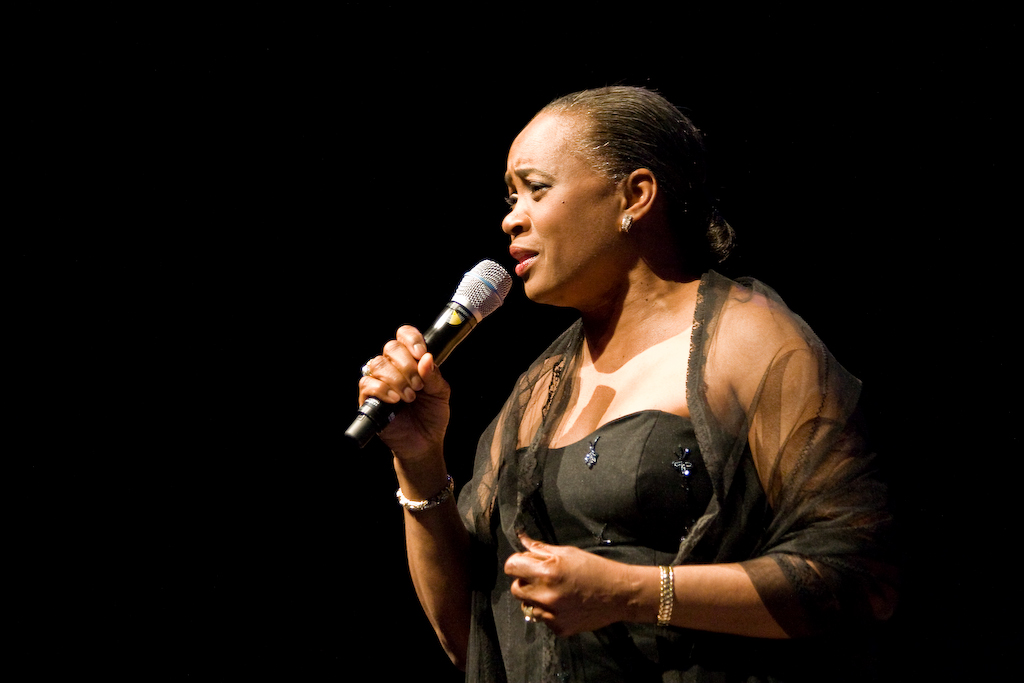
Barbara Hendricks at The Hague Jazz 2008

The Hague Jazz is an annual jazz festival held since 2006 in the World Forum Convention Center in The Hague. The festival was first organized in 2006 after the North Sea Jazz festival moved to Rotterdam in the same year. The Hague Jazz is partnered with the Cape Town International Jazz Festival. The festival was held in the Kyocera Stadium in 2011.

Following the 2011 festival, the promotion declared bankruptcy. Though the foundation submitted a subsidy application following their bankruptcy, the festival did not return.
