= Barbara Hendricks =

American opera singer

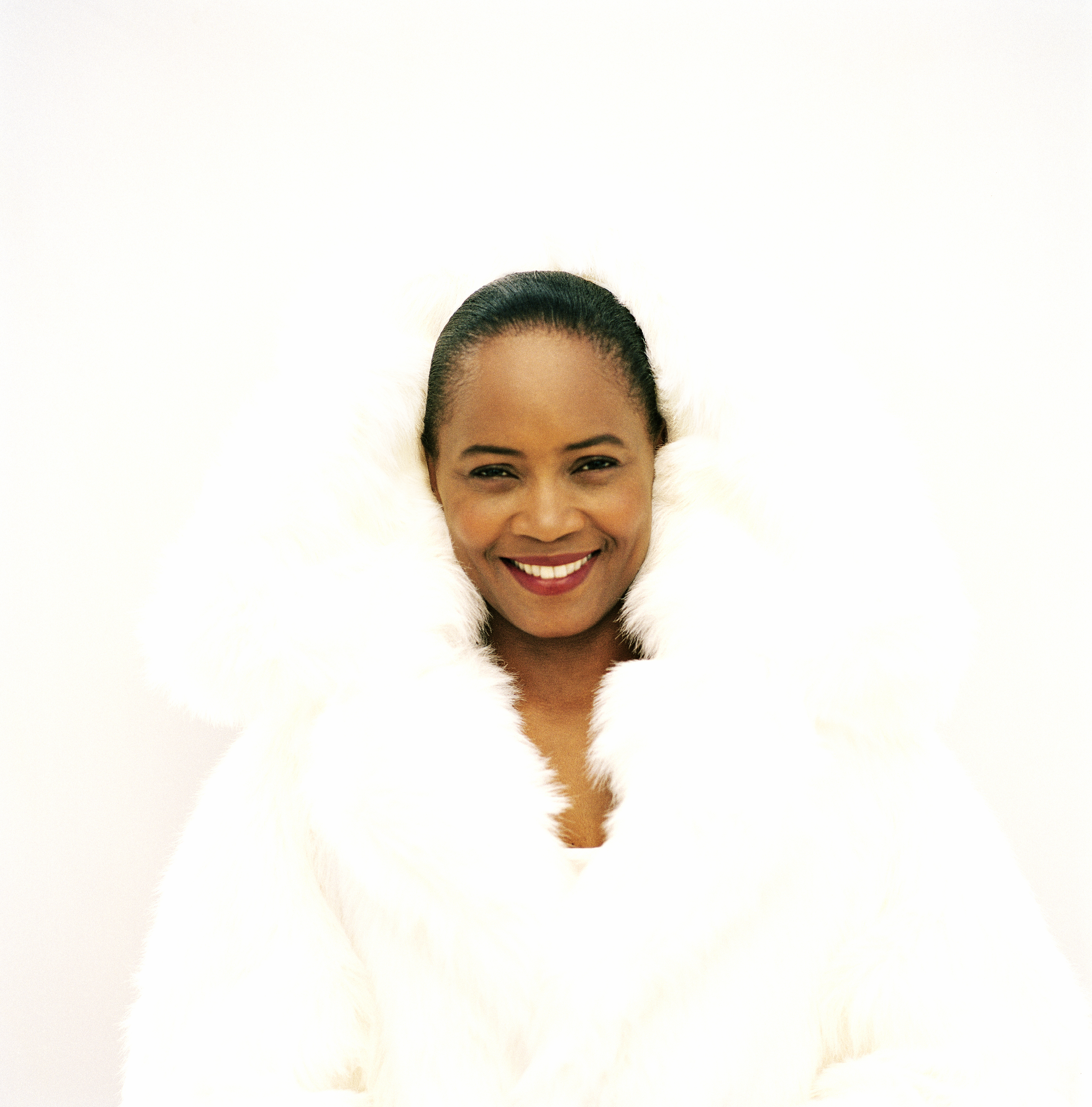
- A portrait of Hendricks
- Born: November 20, 1948 (age 77); Stephens, Arkansas, U.S.
- Education: University of Nebraska, Juilliard School of Music
- Awards: Commandeur of the Ordre des Arts et des Lettres; Chevalier of the Légion d'honneur; Prince of Asturias Award for the Arts; Lions Clubs International Award

Barbara Hendricks (born November 20, 1948) is an American lyric soprano and humanitarian. Born in Arkansas, Hendricks studied chemistry and mathematics at the University of Nebraska before becoming a singer. She gained acclaim for her operatic roles from her 1974 debut onwards, and also performs jazz among other genres. Hendricks has been a UNHCR Goodwill Ambassador since 1987. She has lived in Europe since 1977, and in Switzerland since 1985. She is a citizen of Switzerland and of Sweden following her marriage to a Swedish citizen.

== Early life and education ==
Hendricks was born in Stephens, Arkansas to Malvin and Della Mae Hendricks. Her father was a preacher in the Colored Methodist Episcopal Church, and her mother was a teacher. As a result of her parents' professions, the Hendricks family moved around the Deep South, and Barbara grew up steeped in the black musical tradition. While living in Little Rock and attending Horace Mann High School, she sang in Art Porter Sr.'s choir and babysat his children, prompting her to explore Porter's jazz collection. She briefly attended Lane College before transferring to the University of Nebraska, graduating with a bachelor's degree in mathematics and chemistry at the age of 20. During her time at Nebraska, she sang in the University Singers, and her chance participation in a vocal competition resulted in her attending the Aspen Music Festival and School, where she met mezzo-soprano Jennie Tourel. Tourel encouraged her to apply to the Juilliard School, and upon her acceptance, she studied with Tourel and participated in master classes led by soprano Maria Callas. She graduated with a bachelor's degree in music in 1973.

She has two children, Jennie and Sebastian, with her former husband, Swedish pianist and impresario Martin Engstroem.

== Musical career ==
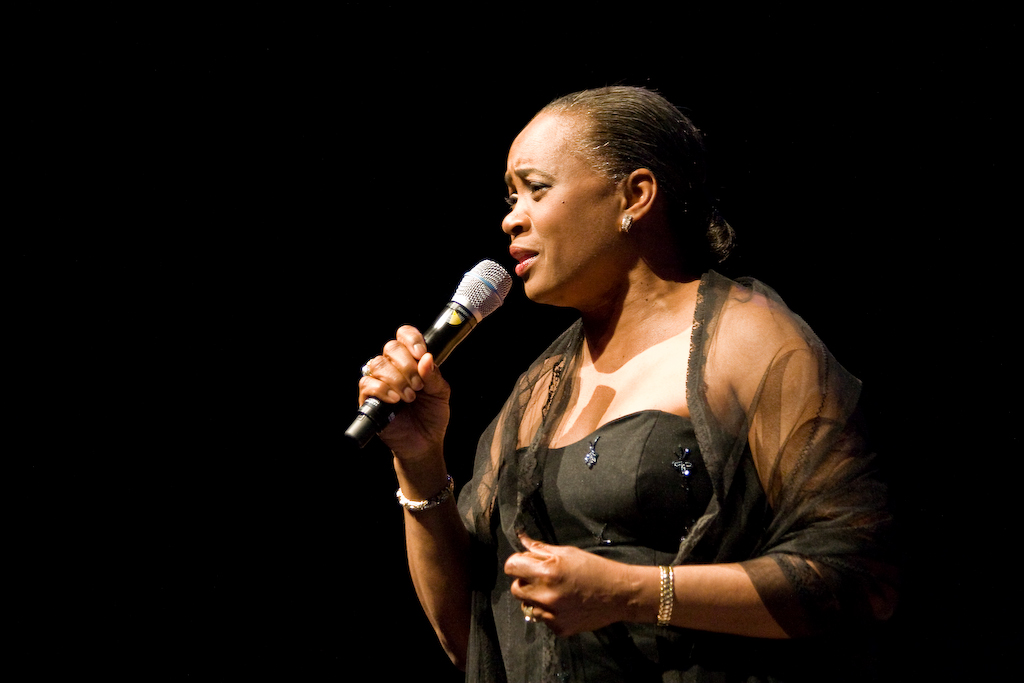
Hendricks at The Hague Jazz 2008

In 1974, Hendricks made her professional operatic debut in Europe at the Glyndebourne Festival and in America at the San Francisco Opera. During her career, she has appeared at major opera houses throughout the world, including the Opéra National de Paris, the Metropolitan Opera, the Royal Opera House, Covent Garden, and La Scala. In 1998 she sang Liù in the historical performance of Turandot at the Forbidden City in Beijing. Hendricks has performed more than twenty roles, twelve of which she has recorded.

Hendricks has appeared on film as Mimì in La bohème, and in 1995 she sang the role of Anne Truelove in the Swedish film Rucklarens väg, an adaptation of Stravinsky's opera The Rake's Progress. In 2007, she appeared in the film Disengagement by Amos Gitai and starring Juliette Binoche. She also recorded Mahler's Das Lied von der Erde, which is the main theme for the film.

Hendricks also performs jazz music and made her jazz debut at the Montreux Jazz Festival in 1994. Since that time, she has performed at major jazz festivals around the world. Hendricks is also known for her love of chamber music and has organized a number of chamber music festivals.

In 2004, at the Théâtre du Châtelet in Paris, she created the role of Angel in the world premiere of Péter Eötvös's opera Angels in America, after the play by Tony Kushner.

In January 2006, she left EMI, and created the new label Arte Verum for which she records exclusively.

In 2018, Hendricks sang "La Marseillaise" with the Choir of the French Army at the interment ceremony of Simone Veil in the Panthéon.

== Humanitarian work ==
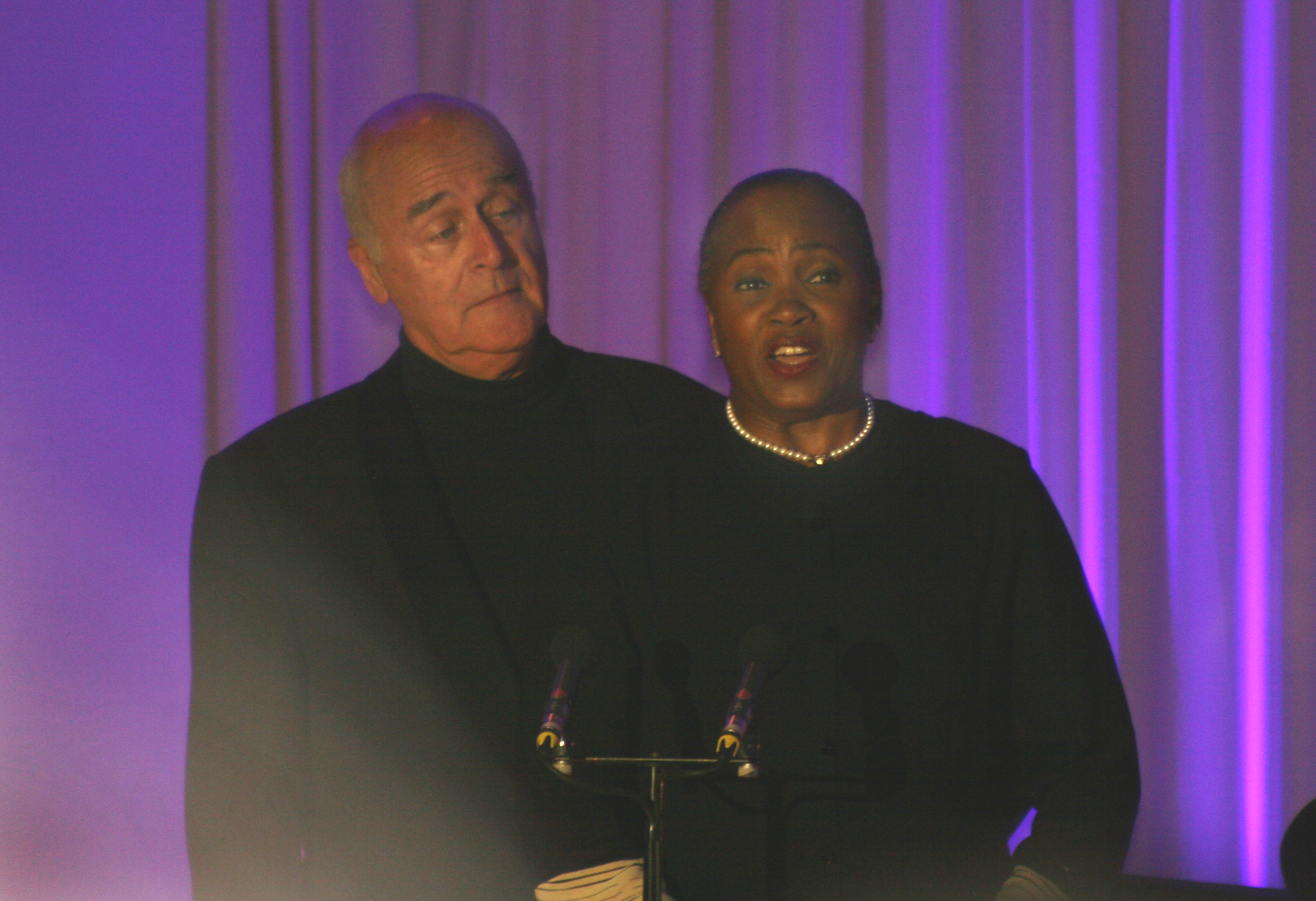
José van Dam and Barbara Hendricks, Brussels 2006

Hendricks cites her upbringing in Jim Crow-Era Arkansas as an inspiration for her extensive activist and humanitarian work.

Hendricks was first appointed as a UNHCR Goodwill Ambassador in 1987, and has continued to serve up to the present, making her the longest-serving UN Goodwill Ambassador. She was named Honorary Lifetime Goodwill Ambassador in 2002, and continues to be the only person who has received that title. In this capacity, she has traveled widely across Africa, Asia, and Europe, and performed at several Nansen Refugee Award ceremonies.

In 1991 and 1993 Hendricks gave two concerts in the war-torn formerly Yugoslavian cities of Dubrovnik and Sarajevo. She performed in Sarajevo with the Sarajevo Opera Chorus and jazz musician Sinan Alimanović. In 1998 she founded the Barbara Hendricks Foundation for Peace and Reconciliation, which seeks to facilitate reconciliation where conflicts have already occurred.

Since 2000, Hendricks has been a member of the Council of the Foundation for the Refugee Education Trust (RET). The RET is dedicated to post-primary education of refugee youth all over the world.

In 2001 she performed at the Nobel Prize ceremony in Oslo at the invitation of Nobel Peace Prize Laureate Kofi Annan. In May 2002, she performed at the East Timor Independence Day Ceremony.

== Awards ==
In 1986, Hendricks was made a Commandeur of the Ordre des Arts et des Lettres; in 1992 she was awarded the rank of Chevalier of the Légion d'honneur. In 2000, she was awarded the Prince of Asturias Award for the Arts. In 2001, Hendricks received the Lions Clubs International Award for the work of her foundation. In 2015, Hendricks received the honorary degree Doctor of Fine Arts from the University of Nebraska–Lincoln.
