= Turandot at the Forbidden City =

Turandot at the Forbidden City was a 1998 live production of Giacomo Puccini's opera Turandot directed by Zhang Yimou.

The opera was performed by Giovanna Casolla, Audrey Stottler, and Sharon Sweet alternating as Princess Turandot; Kristján Jóhannsson, Sergej Larin and Lando Bartolini as Calàf; and Barbara Frittoli, Angela-Maria Blasi and Barbara Hendricks as Liù, with Zubin Mehta conducting the Maggio Musicale Fiorentino. It was staged at the Imperial Ancestral Temple, which is actually just south of the Forbidden City complex proper.

A film was made of the performance with Casolla, Larin and Frittoli. In the United States, the film was aired as part of PBS' Great Performances.
