= Tudor Rickards =

British writer

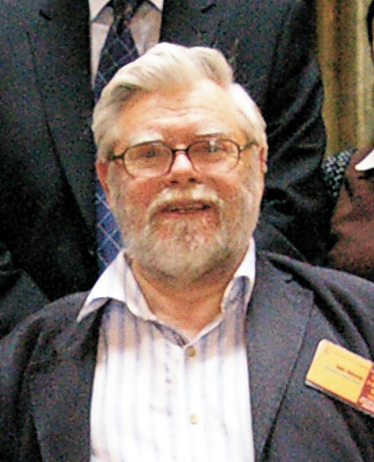
Tudor Rickards at Uppsala Creativity Day 2009, Uppsala Sweden

Tudor Rickards (born 1941 in Pontypridd, Wales) is a self-published author of non-fiction and fiction, a business academic, and a scientist. He is Professor Emeritus at University of Manchester and formerly Professor of creativity and Organisational change at Alliance Manchester Business School. His fiction works include The Unnamed Threat: A Wendy Lockinge Mystery (2019), Seconds Out (2018) and Chronicles of Leadership (2016). His non-fiction includes Tennis Matters: A Leaders We Deserve Monograph (2015), Tennis Tensions (2015), The Manchester Method (2015) and The Double Houdini (2016).

He was an early promoter in Europe of the TRIZ system of creativity and idea generation, inviting TRIZ pioneer Dr Phan Dung to speak at EACI (European Association of Creativity and Innovation) conferences and publishing some of the first papers in English by Dr Phan Dung on the subject in Creativity and Innovation Management.

== Education ==
Rickards was educated at Pontypridd Boys’ Grammar School and went on to study chemistry and radiation chemistry at The University of Wales at Cardiff (now Cardiff University). Following post-doctoral research at New York Medical College in the 1960s, he returned to the UK to work in the R&D department of Unilever Laboratories, based in Port Sunlight, Merseyside, UK. He attended Manchester Business School in 1972. Alan Pearson, founding editor of R&D management journal invited him to join MBS to study creativity techniques in R&D laboratories. The work was subsequently subsumed into the INCA programme (Innovation through Creative Analysis).

== Career ==
A collaboration with Horst Geschka at the Battelle Institute in Frankfurt, Germany, led to a joint publication comparing practices and deficiencies in the application of creativity techniques in the UK and in Germany. He worked on the development of networks enabling European creativity practitioners to work together and explore alternatives to the dominant US models.

He co-founded the academic journal, Creativity and Innovation Management, in 1991 and is Alex Osborn Visiting professor at State University of New York, Buffalo, a lifetime position offered to scholars who are deemed to enrich teaching at the university's Centre for Studies in Creativity.

He is developing the use of non-traditional fictional modes for exploring issues in leadership theory. The world of nature has also been a source of inspiration, with work on intelligent horsemanship and the lessons it offers for the workplace, and profiling management and leadership styles using animal behaviour. His work has been criticised for attempting to learn lessons from studying animal rather than human behaviour.

He was the guest speaker for the 2014 Alex Osborn memorial event at Buffalo State University on the theme of Dissecting Creativity.

In March 2015, Rickards took part in a keynote introduction to the ARTEM Organizational Creativity International Conference in Nancy, France, on rethinking paths on creativity to move organizations towards sustainability.

On 17 April 2015, Rickards co-presented Taking Tough Decisions: A Creative Problem-Solving Approach with Dr Rebecca Baron (Associate Dean General Practice Health Education North West) at the Fifth National Medical Leadership conference at the Macron Stadium, Bolton.

In 2015, Rickards self-published an eBook The Manchester Method: A Leaders We Deserve Monograph

He lectures at the Research University - Higher School of Economics in Moscow.

Rickards contributed as keynote speaker at the 1st National Medical Leadership Conference of the Mersey & North Western Deaneries, Reebok Stadium Bolton, 10 March 2011, and at the Institute of Directors North West annual conference on Leading through Change, Manchester, 22 March 2012.

In August 2010, Rickards contributed to an eBook collection of political poems entitled Emergency Verse – Poetry in Defence of the Welfare State edited by Alan Morrison.

As of August 2011, Rickards has been appointed to the board of international advisors to the Institute for Creative Management and Innovation, Kinki University, Japan.

Since formal retirement, Rickards has written recreationally in multiple formats. He regularly updates his blogging platform, Leaders We Deserve, which analyses contemporary styles of leadership. He also writes and uploads poetry to another personal website, The Reluctant Witterer.

In November 2021, Rickards published an e-book, Boris, Me and the BBC, a combined memoir and political history of the years 2016 - 2020 in Great Britain. It details his life and experiences in response to the political turbulence of the European Union referendum, the election and tenure of Boris Johnson, and the beginnings of the COVID-19 pandemic.

At the end of March 2022, Rickards produced the first episode of his podcast, Tudorama.

== In the media ==
Rickards is regularly quoted in the British media. He is a pioneer and advocate of the ‘Manchester Method’ – the system of creative and applied learning championed by Manchester Business School – on which he has written widely.

Rickards’ research has been described by the Financial Times as non-traditional.

== Bibliography ==
- Rickards, Tudor (1974). Problem Solving Through Creativity. Wiley. ISBN 978-0-470-72045-5.
- Rickards, Tudor (1997). Creativity and Problem Solving at Work. Gower Publishing, Ltd. ISBN 978-0-566-07961-0.
- Rickards, Tudor; Clark, M. (2006). Dilemmas of Leadership. Routledge. ISBN 978-0-415-35584-1.
- Rickards, Tudor; Runco, Mark A.; Moger, Susan (2008). The Routledge Companion To Creativity. Routledge. ISBN 978-0-415-77317-1.
- Rickards, Tudor (2011). Dilemmas of Leadership (2nd ed.). Routledge. ISBN 978-0-415-61854-0.
