= Giovanna Casolla =

Italian operatic soprano

Giovanna Casolla (born 15 January 1945, in Naples) is an Italian operatic soprano. She studied at the Conservatorio di San Pietro a Majella of Naples, and made her debut at the Spoleto Festival in 1977. She played the title role in Turandot at the Forbidden City in 1998. She has appeared frequently with the Boston Opera and the Baltimore Opera.
