= Barbara Frittoli =

Italian operatic soprano

- Born: 19 April 1967 (age 59); Milan, Italy
- Education: Milan Conservatory
- Occupation: Operatic soprano
- Years active: 1990–present
- Title: Kammersängerin

Barbara Frittoli (born 19 April 1967) is an Italian operatic soprano, specializing in operas by Verdi and Mozart. She has sung leading roles in opera houses throughout Europe and in the United States, such as La Scala in Milan and the Metropolitan Opera in New York. Her signature roles include Mimì in La bohème, the Countess in The Marriage of Figaro, Donna Elvira in Don Giovanni, Desdemona in Otello.

== Life ==
Frittoli was born in Milan. At the age of 9, she started piano studies at the Milan Conservatory, intending to become a pianist. When she was singing in the Conservatory choir at 12 years old, she was noticed by Giulio Bertola and Bruno Casoni. Under their recommendation, she switched to singing, in alto, which resulted in vocal troubles. She only recovered her voice after studying with Giovanna Canetti, under whose instruction she developed into a soprano.

She made her professional debut in 1990 as Ines in Il trovatore conducted by Zubin Mehta with Luciano Pavarotti as the main role at the Teatro Comunale, Florence.

In 1992, she debuted in the U.S. at the Opera Company of Philadelphia as Micaëla in Carmen. Three years later, she made her Metropolitan Opera debut in 1995 as Micaëla in Carmen and has gone on to sing in over 80 performances there including Donna Elvira in Don Giovanni, Fiordiligi in Così fan tutte, Angelica in Suor Angelica, Desdemona in Otello, the title role in Luisa Miller, Amelia in Simon Boccanegra, Vitellia in La clemenza di Tito, and Alicia Ford in Falstaff. She performed in two editions of Glyndebourne Festival Opera, in Graham Vick's new productions of Così fan tutte (Fiordiligi, 1998) and Don Giovanni (Donna Anna, 2000).

In June 1998, she was featured in the role of Liù in Turandot at the Forbidden City, an outdoor production of the Puccini opera.

In December 1999, she sang Alice Ford in Vick's new Falstaff, which opened the first season after Royal Opera House's refurbishment.

In December 2004, she added Elisabetta di Valois in Don Carlo to her repertoire, alternating the role with Adrianne Pieczonka at the Teatro Comunale, Florence.

In December 2008, she starred in a new production of Massenet's Thaïs, inaugurating Teatro Regio di Torino's new season. In 2012, she debuted in the title role in Adriana Lecouvreur at the Liceu.

== Personal life ==
Frittoli was married to baritone Natale de Carolis, with whom she had a daughter, Arianna. She had been in a relationship with Ildar Abdrazakov.

== Awards ==
Frittoli won the Female Singer of the Year (Sängerin des Jahres) in the 2001 Echo Klassik.

In 2012, she was invested as Austrian Kammersängerin.

== Recordings ==
Full works on CD

- Rossini: The Barber of Seville (1993). Jesús López-Cobos, Orchestre de Chambre de Lausanne, Chœur du Grand Théâtre de Genève (Teldec)
- Turandot at the Forbidden City of Beijing (1998). Zubin Mehta, Orchestra & Chorus of the Teatro Comunale, Florence (RCA Victor)
- Puccini: La bohème (2000). Zubin Mehta, Israel Philharmonic Orchestra (Decca)
- Leoncavallo: Pagliacci (2000). Riccardo Chailly, Royal Concertgebouw Orchestra, Netherlands Radio Choir (Decca)
- Verdi: Il trovatore (2001). Riccardo Muti, La Scala Orchestra & Chorus (Sony)
- Mozart: Idomeneo (2002). Charles Mackerras, Scottish Chamber Orchestra, Edinburgh Festival Chorus (EMI)
- Stabat Mater (Rossini) (2003); Riccardo Chailly, Royal Concertgebouw Orchestra, Netherlands Radio Choir (Decca)
- Requiem (Verdi) (2010). Riccardo Muti, Chicago Symphony Orchestra (CSO Resound; Recorded live in Orchestra Hall of Symphony Center, 15/16/17 January 2009)
- Verdi: Simon Boccanegra (2015). Constantine Orbelian, Kaunas City Symphony Orchestra, Kaunas State Choir (Delos)

Full works on video

- Rossini: Il viaggio a Reims (1992). Claudio Abbado, Berliner Philharmoniker, Rundfunkchor Berlin
- Mozart: Cosi fan tutte (1996). Vienna State Opera (Euroarts, released in 2008)
- Turandot at the Forbidden City (1998). (RCA Victor)
- Verdi: Falstaff (1999). Royal Opera, London (Opus Arte)
- Stabat Mater (Pergolesi) (2000). (Musicom, recorded in Santuario della Beata Vergine dei Miracoli, Saronno)
- Verdi: Otello (2001). La Scala (TDK, released in 2003)
- Rossini: Moïse et Pharaon (2003). La Scala (TDK, released in 2005)
- Puccini: Turandot (2005). Liceu (Arthaus Musik, released in 2012)
- Verdi: Falstaff (2006). Teatro Comunale, Florence (Arthaus Musik, released in 2013)
- Puccini: Suor Angelica from Il trittico (2008). La Scala (Hardy Classic, released in 2009)
- Massenet: Thaïs (2008). Teatro Regio (Turin) (Arthaus Musik, released in 2009)
- Mozart: The Marriage of Figaro (2009). Teatro Real (released in 2011)
- Bizet: Carmen (2010). Metropolitan Opera (Deutsche Grammophon, released in 2010)
- Mozart: The Marriage of Figaro (2010). Paris Opera (Bel Air Classiques, released in 2012)
- Verdi: Falstaff (2011). Zürich Opera House (C Major Entertainment, released in 2012)
- Mozart: Don Giovanni (2011). Metropolitan Opera (Met Opera on Demand)
- Mozart: Don Giovanni (2011). La Scala (Deutsche Grammophon, released in 2015)
- Mozart: La clemenza di Tito (2012). Metropolitan Opera (Met Opera on Demand)

Recitals and others

- 2001: Barbara Frittoli Sings Mozart Arias; Charles Mackerras, Scottish Chamber Orchestra (Erato)
- 2001: Verdi Arias; Colin Davis, London Symphony Orchestra (Erato)
- 2001: Gran Gala di Verdi [DVD] (EuroArts, released in 2007)

== Opera roles ==
- Ines, Il trovatore (Verdi)
- Mimì, La bohème (Puccini)
- Delia / Modestina, Il viaggio a Reims (Rossini)
- Micaëla, Carmen (Bizet)
- Agnese, Beatrice di Tenda (Bellini)
- Berta, The Barber of Seville (Rossini)
- Flaminio, Il Flaminio (Pergolesi)
- Countess Almaviva, The Marriage of Figaro (Mozart)
- Antonia, The Tales of Hoffmann (Offenbach)
- Donna Elvira, Don Giovanni (Mozart)
- Desdemona, Otello (Verdi)
- Sifare, Mitridate, re di Ponto (Mozart)
- Fiordiligi, Così fan tutte (Mozart)
- Medora, Il corsaro (Verdi)
- Liù, Turandot (Puccini)
- Amelia, Simon Boccanegra (Verdi)
- Alice Ford, Falstaff (Verdi)
- Marguerite, Faust (Gounod)
- Nedda, Pagliacci (Leoncavallo)
- Donna Anna, Don Giovanni (Mozart)
- Leonora, Il trovatore (Verdi)
- Elettra, Idomeneo (Mozart)
- Luisa, Luisa Miller (Verdi)
- Maria Stuarda, Maria Stuarda (Donizetti)
- Vitellia, La clemenza di Tito (Mozart)
- Anaï, Moïse et Pharaon (Rossini)
- Elisabetta di Valois, Don Carlos (Verdi)
- Sister Angelica, Suor Angelica (Puccini)
- Thaïs, Thaïs (Massenet)
- Floria Tosca, Tosca (Puccini)
- Adriana, Adriana Lecouvreur (Cilea)
