= Petr Weigl =

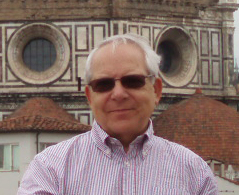
- Petr Weigl, 2011
- Born: 16 March 1939; Brno, Czechoslovakia
- Died: 14 July 2018 (aged 79)
- Occupation: Director
- Years active: 1961–2018
- Website: petrweigl.cz

Petr Weigl (16 March 1939 – 14 July 2018) was a Czech director and playwright.

== Biography ==
In 1961 he graduated from the Prague Film School and the Academy of Performing Arts Television. He worked in the cinema, on television (1961-1976), at the National Theatre (Narodni divadlo, 1976–1991). He created a number of short and feature films for the Czech and Slovak Television, as well as for German public channels ARD and ZDF, British channels BBC and Channel 4. He was twice nominated for the Emmy Award.

He worked in the theaters of Paris and Munich. A major success was the production of Richard Strauss's opera Salome in the Deutsche Oper in Berlin.

== Works ==
- 1967 Bolero (TV)
- 1967 Osamělost (TV)
- 1967 Pas de quatre (TV)
- 1968 Svět je báječné místo k narození (TV)
- 1969 Bludiště moci (TV)
- 1970 Radúz a Mahulena
- 1971 Romeo a Julie (TV)
- 1972 Dva bratři (TV)
- 1972 Faust a Markéta
- 1973 Apollón a múzy / Apollon Musagétes
- 1973 Margita a Besná (TV)
- 1974 Čarodějná láska / El amor brujo
- 1977 Vzkříšení / Vzkrisenie (TV)
- 1977: Rusalka (Dvorak)
- 1979 Poetické úvahy ve volných chvílích / Poetische Betrachtungen in freien Stunden (TV)
- 1980 Nerozumný génius / Der Wahnwitzige Genius
- 1982 Pod koly osudu / The Turn of the Screw (TV)
- 1983 Zuzana Vojířová (TV)
- 1984 Achilles (TV)
- 1984 Utrpení svatého Šebestiána / Le Martyre de Saint Sébastien
- 1985 Olověná noc / Die Nacht aus Blei (TV)
- 1986 Werther (TV)
- 1987 Paví pírko / Die Pfauenfeder (TV)
- 1988 Marie Stuartovna / Maria Stuarda (TV)
- 1988 Evžen Oněgin (TV)
- 1990 Dumky (TV)
- 1990 Romeo a Julie na vsi / A Village Romeo and Juliet (TV)
- 1992 Lady Macbeth Mcenského újezdu / Lady Macbeth of Mtsensk (TV)
- 1993 Zimní cesta / Die Winterreise (TV)
- 1996 Jak se dělá opera / Let's Make an Opera (TV)
