= Glyn Davies (rugby union) =

Wales international rugby union player (1927–1976)

- Born: Glyn Davies; 24 August 1927 Cilfynydd, Wales
- Died: 7 November 1976 (aged 49) Bristol, England
- Height: 5 ft 9 in (175 cm)
- Weight: 11 st (154 lb; 70 kg)
- School: Pontypridd Grammar School
- University: St Catharine's College, Cambridge
- Occupation: wine merchant

Rugby union career
- Position: Fly-half
Amateur team(s)
Years	Team	Apps	(Points)
- Cilfynydd RFC
1945–1949	Cardiff RFC		
- Glamorgan Wanderers RFC
1947–1948	Pontypridd RFC		
1948–1950	Cambridge University		
1951	Newport RFC		
- Clifton RFC
- Bristol Rugby
- The Army
1948–	Barbarian F.C.		
- Gloucestershire
International career
Years	Team	Apps	(Points)
1947–1951	Wales	11	(0)

Glyn Davies (24 August 1927 – 7 November 1976) was a Welsh international rugby union fly-half who played club rugby for a large selection of clubs but most notably for Pontypridd and Cambridge University. He won eleven international caps for Wales including a win over the touring 1947 Australia team. Described as a mercurial outside half, Davies was notable for his sidestep and ability to change pace and direction with ease.

He was the brother-in-law of Welsh opera singer Sir Geraint Evans.

== Rugby career ==
Davies first played rugby as a schoolboy for Pontypridd Grammar School. After the end of the Second World War, while still a schoolboy he represented a Welsh team in two Victory internationals. Davies played his early club rugby for local team Cilfynydd RFC and sporadically he played for other more notable teams, playing his first game of four for Cardiff in the 1945/46 season. He joined Pontypridd where his natural ability was polished by endless training sessions under the tutorship of groundsman Dick Coates. It was while with Pontypridd that Davies was first called to the Wales national squad. His first cap was against Scotland in the 1947 Five Nations Championship, partnered at fly half with Haydn Tanner. Wales were comfortable winners, but the next game Davies was replaced by Billy Cleaver and Davies failed to be reselected for the rest of the campaign. In December 1947 Davies was chosen for his second Welsh international game, a 6–0 victory over the touring Australian team, this time partnered with Handel Greville.

When Davies matriculated at St Catharine's College, Cambridge he gained a place in the Cambridge University rugby team, and won three 'Blues' by playing in the Varsity matches between 1948 and 1950. 1948 also saw Davies play the entirety of the Five Nations Championship, linking again with Tanner in all four matches. During the 1948/49 season Davies was selected to play for touring invitational team the Barbarians. 1949 saw Davies play in three of the Five Nations Championship matches, yet again in partnership with Tanner. The 1949 encounter against England is recognisied as one of his finest displays. During the match, he took advantage of Tanner's trade mark long passes to cut through the English defence to set up two tries for Les Williams. Davies was replaced by Cleaver in the Ireland encounter of 1949, and the next season the Welsh selectors decided to adopt Cleaver and Rex Willis at the half back positions.

Although not selected for Wales in 1950, Davies was made captain of the Cambridge University team that season, and led the team to a win over Oxford University at that year's Varsity Match. Neither team showed much quality in their play, though it is reported that Davies' 'erratic brilliance' was seldom offered full scope by his partner or his forwards.

In 1951, Davies played eleven games for Newport, entering the team as a short-term replacement for regular Newport fly-half Roy Burnett, who was forced to withdraw from the team after an injury. 1951 was also the final year of Davies' international career. Called into the Wales squad for the two opening matches of the 1951 Five Nations Championship, and partnered by Willis, he was replaced by Cliff Morgan and never represented Wales again. In the 1950s Davies turned out for Clifton and Bristol and played county rugby for Gloucestershire.

=== International matches played ===
Wales

- Australia 1947
- England 1948, 1949, 1951
- Ireland 1948
- France 1948, 1949
- Scotland 1947, 1948, 1949, 1951

== Bibliography ==
- Griffiths, John (1987). The Phoenix Book of International Rugby Records. London: Phoenix House. ISBN 0-460-07003-7.
- Smith, David; Williams, Gareth (1980). Fields of Praise: The Official History of The Welsh Rugby Union. Cardiff: University of Wales Press. ISBN 0-7083-0766-3.
