= Alexander Tsymbalyuk =

Ukrainian opera singer (born 1976)

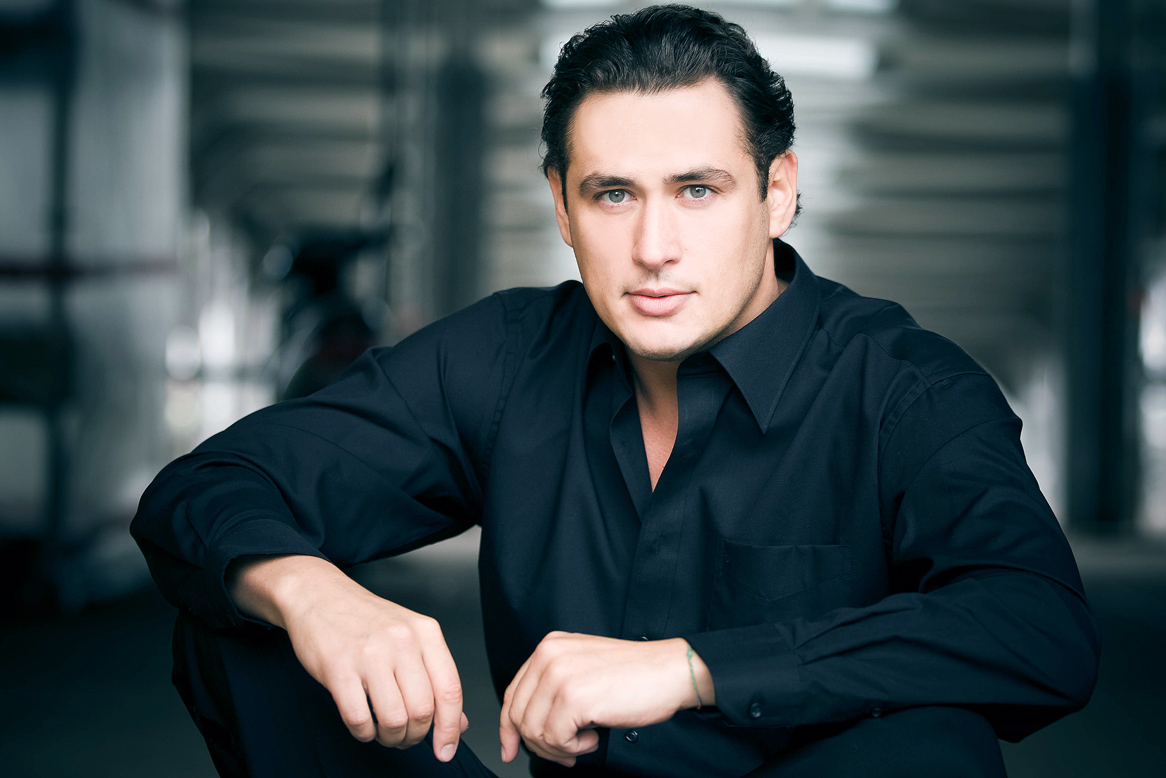
Alexander Tsymbalyuk

Alexander Tsymbalyuk (Ukrainian: Олександр Цимбалюк; born 1 March 1976) is a Ukrainian bass opera singer, a former member of the Hamburg State Opera.

== Life and career ==
Tsymbalyuk was born on 1 March 1976 in Odesa. He launched his career at the Odesa Opera House in 2000 in Eugene Onegin. From 2001 to 2003, he was member of the Hamburg Opera Studio. In 2003, Tsymbalyuk completed his vocal studies at the Odesa Conservatory under Ludmila Ivanova, Vasiliy Navrotskiy and Paata Burchuladze. From 2003 to 2012, he was ensemble member of the Hamburg State Opera. He made his debut with the Metropolitan Opera in 2010 as Ferrando in Il trovatore. and with The Royal Opera in the 2013/14 season, singing the Commendatore in Don Giovanni, Tsymbalyuk performed the title role in Boris Godunov at several stages, including Oper Frankfurt, Munich Opera Festival, Vienna State Opera, Concertgebouw, Amsterdam, and Opera de Paris.

== Awards ==
- 2006 Elena Obraztsova Competition in Moscow
- 2007 Riccardo Zandonai Competition in Italy
- 2007 International Tchaikovsky Competition in Moscow
- 2024 Hamburger Kammersänger

== Repertoire ==
- Don Giovanni, Commendatore
- Rigoletto, Sparafucile
- Macbeth, Banco
- Aida, Ramfis
- Das Rheingold, Fafner, Fasolt
- Lucia di Lammermoor, Raimondo Bidebent
- Parsifal, Titurel
- Boris Godunov, title role
- Turandot, Timur
- Die Walküre, Hunding
- Il trovatore, Ferrando
- Simon Boccanegra, Fiesco

== Discography ==
- Puccini, Giacomo; Wilson, Jennifer; Bocelli, Andrea; et al. (2015), Turandot (in German), Berlin, Hamburg: Dt. Grammophon Universal Music [Vertrieb], OCLC 1184730833
- Verdi, Giuseppe; O'Neill, Simon; Finley, Gerald; et al. (2010), Otello opera in four acts (in Italian), London: London Symphony Orchestra, OCLC 953583338

=== DVD-Video ===
- Puccini, Giacomo; Berio, Luciano; Adami, Giuseppe; et al. (2017), Turandot (in Italian), London: Decca, OCLC 1435193689
- Wagner, Richard; Barenboim, Daniel; Carmine, Patrizia; et al. (2015), Der Ring des Nibelungen a stage festival drama for three days and a preliminary evening (in German), [Halle (Saale)]: Arthaus Musik, OCLC 908214098
- Wagner, Richard; Cassiers, Guy; Barenboim, Daniel; et al. (2013), Siegfried (in German), [Halle, Saale]: Arthaus Musik GmbH, OCLC 1077734995
- Mozart, Wolfgang Amadeus; Varesco, Giambattista; Bolton, Ivor; et al. (2020), Idomeneo (in Italian), [Salfords]: Naxos Rights (Europe) Ltd, OCLC 1196825960
- Mussorgsky, Modest; Bieito, Calixto; Sommer, Andy; et al. (2014), Boris Godunov opera in four acts and seven scenes (in Russian), [S.l.]: Bel Air Classiques, OCLC 879625501
