= Cilfynydd =

Village near Pontypridd, South Wales

Coordinates: 51.625°N 3.32°W

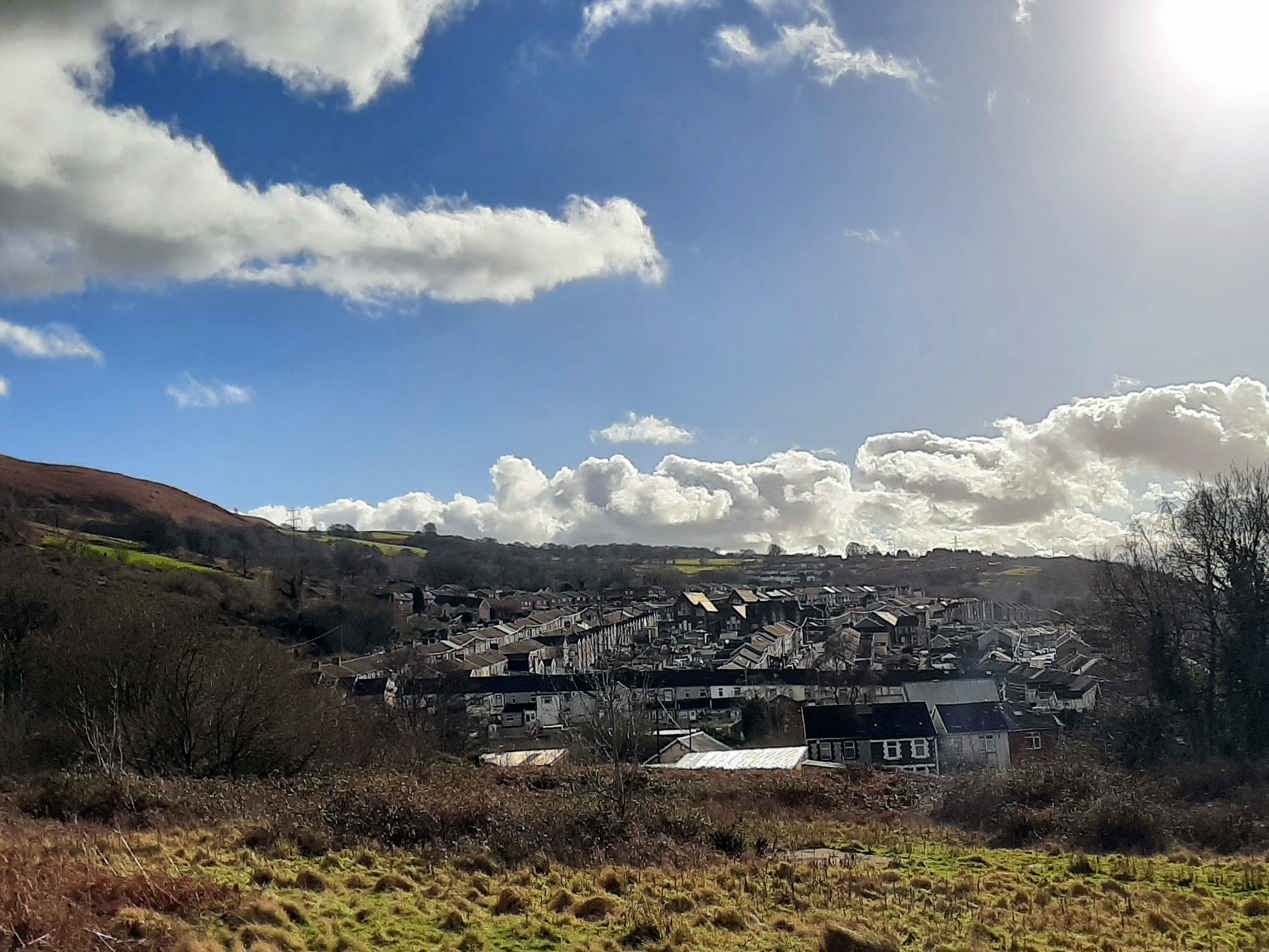

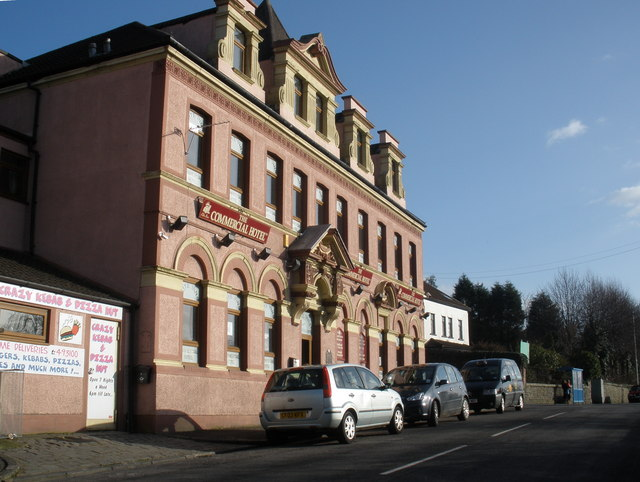

- Location within Rhondda Cynon Taf
- Population: 2,855 (2011 Ward)
- Principal area: Rhondda Cynon Taf
- Preserved county: Mid Glamorgan
- Country: Wales
- Sovereign state: United Kingdom
- Post town: Pontypridd
- Postcode district: CF37
- Police: South Wales
- Fire: South Wales
- Ambulance: Welsh
- UK Parliament: Cynon Valley

Cilfynydd is a village in the county borough of Rhondda Cynon Taf, Wales, a mile from the South Wales Valleys town of Pontypridd, and 13 miles north of the capital city, Cardiff. Cilfynydd is also an electoral ward for the county council and Pontypridd Town Council.

== History ==
Situated on the banks of the River Taff, the village was named after Cilfynydd farm, which was on the east side of the valley. Cilfynydd Farm was farmed by the Lloyd family, most recently Gwun and Lewis Lloyd, who are now both deceased. Cilfynydd was originally a farming hamlet, consisting of some cottages built along the Glamorganshire Canal and a few surrounding farms. These properties, according to the 1881 census, housed about 100 people, but this all changed over the next two decades.

Bethel Methodist Chapel, on Williams Street, was built in 1887.

== Albion Colliery ==
Sinking of Albion Colliery began in August 1884 on the site of Ynyscaedudwg Farm. It was owned by the Albion Steam Coal Company and opened in August 1887. It was served by the Llancaiach Branch line of the Taff Vale Railway. Production at the colliery quickly began to prosper and its average weekly output reached around 12,000 tons. This was an unusually large amount of tonnage for a single shaft coal-winding colliery—in fact, it was one of the largest in South Wales. By 1893, 1,500 men and boys were employed at the Albion. The colliery's early years were relatively free of serious incidents.

Albion was the scene of the second worst disaster in the South Wales Coalfield, after the later disaster at the Universal Colliery at Senghenydd in 1913. At four o'clock on Saturday 23 June 1894, the ignition of coal dust following an explosion of firedamp triggered a massive explosion, killing 290 men and boys. Of the 125 horses, only 2 survived. Many of the bodies brought to the surface were so badly mutilated that identification was virtually impossible, and there were several instances of corpses being carried to the wrong houses. Almost everyone in the community lost someone in the disaster, with one family on Howell Street losing 11 members: the father, four sons, and six lodgers.

A nine-day inquiry concluded that the deceased had lost their lives through a gas explosion at the Albion colliery, which was augmented by coal dust. However, the jury was not able to come to an agreement over the exact origin over the explosion.

The Colliery was taken over in the 1930s by Powell Duffryn, then later nationalised by National Coal Board in 1947. At the time, there were 991 men employed. The mine closed in 1966, but with the tips threatening a disaster similar to Aberfan, a two-phased scheme to reduce the steep gradient of the spoil began in 1974 and was completed two years later.

== Tornado of October 1913 ==
On 27 October 1913 a severe thunderstorm produced tornadoes that touched down in South Wales, Shropshire and Cheshire. The tornado measured T6 on the TORRO scale. Three people were killed, including one from Cilfynydd. This was the worst confirmed death-toll for a recent UK tornado. On Richard Street, many shop fronts were blown in and the goods scattered in the street. The corrugated iron roof of the Co-operation Stores was blown clean away and two roofs on houses in Park Place were stripped. Damage to property across the area where the storm struck was estimated at £40,000 in terms of repairs required – a considerable sum equivalent to around £5 million in 2024.

== The village ==
The development of the village occurred as a result of the development of the Albion Colliery, to provide housing for the workforce.

Typical of the time, the houses were terraced and built along a parallel track to the Cardiff to Merthyr road. It is said that the original terrace streets in Cilfynydd were named after the sons and daughters of the developer: Howell Street, Ann Street, William Street, John Street, Richard Street and Mary Street.

The majority of Cilfynydd's housing and public buildings were built between 1884 and 1910. This fast development was necessary, as by 1891, the population had increased fivefold to over 500. The following decade witnessed an even greater rate of increase, as the 1901 census shows the population totalled 3,500 people. By this point, the village also had four chapels, three public houses, a school, a church, a post office, and a workman's hall. The War Memorial is located at the north end of the village and lists the names of the 65 Clifynydd men who fell during The Great War and the 26 men who fell during World War 2. One individual whose name is listed under those of the Great War casualties was awarded the Military Medal for valour.

The village now has a permanent memorial dedicated to all those who lost their lives at the Albion Colliery. Pontypridd High School resides on the location of the former pit, and the capped mine shafts are still visible today.

== Transport ==
Clifynydd was situated on a drover's trail along the route of the River Taff and is on the route of the Glamorganshire Canal.

Due to the development of the Albion Colliery, the Llancaiach Branch of the Taff Vale Railway was constructed adjacent to the village, with through passenger services from Pontypridd to Nelson by TVR railmotor. These served Cilfynydd Station from 1 June 1900 until 12 September 1932.

The main road through Cilfynydd was the main route between Cardiff and Merthyr Tydfil, before the building of the A470 dual carriageway on the route of the Llancaiach Branch railway line.

A tram service began on 6 March 1905, running from Cilfynydd through Pontypridd to Treforest. It was replaced on 18 September 1930 by trolleybuses, and later replaced by buses which follow almost the same route.

== Governance ==
Cilfynydd also forms an electoral ward, sending a county councillor to sit on Rhondda Cynon Taf County Borough Council. It is also a ward for Pontypridd Town Council, electing two town councillors.

== Notable people ==
All of the following were born in William Street, Cilfynydd:

- Merlyn Rees (1920–2006), politician
- Geraint Evans (1922–1992), operatic bass-baritone
- Glyn Davies (1927–1976), international rugby player
- Stuart Burrows (1933–2025), operatic tenor
- Rhys Britton (born 1999), Commonwealth Games cyclist

Born in Mary Street:

- Gareth Wood (1950-2023), composer and double-bassist
