= Senghenydd colliery disaster =

1913 mining explosion in Wales

Coordinates: 51.6118°N 3.2807°W

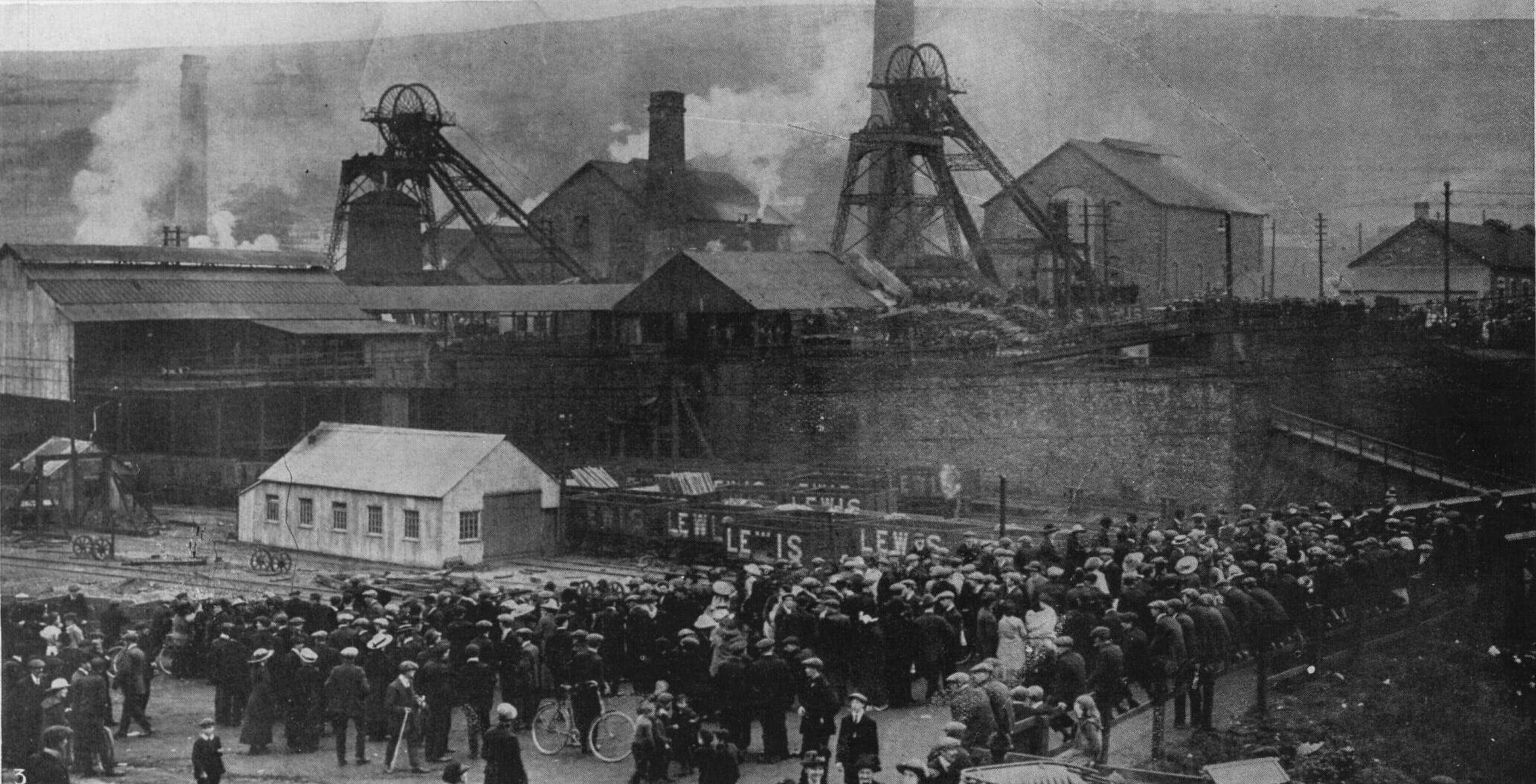
Crowds await news at the Universal Colliery, Senghenydd.

The Senghenydd colliery disaster, also known as the Senghenydd explosion (Welsh: Tanchwa Senghennydd), occurred at the Universal Colliery in Senghenydd, near Caerphilly, Glamorgan, Wales, on 14 October 1913. The explosion, which killed 439 coal miners and a rescuer, is the worst mining accident in the United Kingdom. Universal Colliery, on the South Wales Coalfield, extracted steam coal, which was much in demand. Some of the region's coal seams contained high quantities of firedamp, a highly explosive gas consisting of methane and hydrogen.

In an earlier disaster in May 1901, three underground explosions at the colliery killed 81 miners. The inquest established that the colliery had high levels of airborne coal dust, which would have exacerbated the explosion and carried it further into the mine workings. The cause of the 1913 explosion is unknown, but the subsequent inquiry thought the most likely cause was a spark from underground signalling equipment that could have ignited any firedamp present. The miners in the east side of the workings were evacuated, but the men in the western section bore the brunt of the explosion, fire and afterdamp—a poisonous mixture of carbon dioxide, carbon monoxide and nitrogen left after an explosion.

Fires in the workings hampered rescue efforts, and it took several days before they were under control. It took several weeks for most of the bodies to be recovered. The subsequent enquiry pointed to errors made by the company and its management leading to charges of negligence against Edward Shaw, the colliery manager, and the owners. Shaw was fined £24 while the company was fined £10; newspapers calculated the cost of each miner lost was just 1 shilling 1 1/4d (about equivalent to £6 in 2025).

In 1981 a memorial to the men who died in the disaster was unveiled by the National Coal Board. In October 2013, on the centenary of the tragedy, a Welsh national memorial to those killed in all Wales's mining disasters was unveiled at the former pithead, depicting a rescue worker coming to the aid of one of the survivors of the explosion.

== Background ==
Senghenydd in modern-day Caerphilly County Borough

=== Welsh coal industry ===
The Welsh coal industry employed 1,500 workers in 1800; as the industry expanded, the workforce rose to 30,000 by 1864, and to 250,000 by 1913. (Note: John Benson, in his 1989 history British Coalminers in the Nineteenth Century, put the rise over the same period as 133,000.) As employment became available, many people moved to the area of the South Wales Coalfield; between 1851 and 1911 the population increased by 320,000. By 1913 the Welsh collieries were extracting 56.8 million long tons (57.7 million tonnes; 63.6 million short tons) of coal a year, up from 8.5 million long tons (8.6 million tonnes; 9.5 million short tons) in 1854; collieries in the region mined a fifth of all coal produced in the UK, and employed a fifth of its miners in the mid-nineteenth century. In 1913 Britain was responsible for 25 per cent of world coal production and 55 per cent of all world coal exports.

The South Wales Coalfield produced the sought-after anthracite, bituminous and steam coals—the latter a grade between the two comprising a hard coal without the coking elements. Some of the region's coal seams contained high quantities of firedamp—a mixture of methane and hydrogen—and were therefore prone to explosions; firedamp rises into the higher points of workings, including cavities or, as at Senghenydd, when the seams were being mined in an upward gradient. An additional danger of firedamp is afterdamp, a poisonous mixture of gases left after an explosion, primarily constituted of carbon dioxide, carbon monoxide and nitrogen. The carbon monoxide combines with haemoglobin in the bloodstream to form carboxyhemoglobin, which prevents the blood cells carrying oxygen, and can therefore result in suffocation by lack of oxygen known as anoxia. If survivors from an explosion are not rescued quickly, they face the possibility of being killed by the gas. The presence of firedamp in South Wales's collieries contributed to a higher-than-average proportion of accidents: between 1880 and 1900 South Wales accounted for 18 per cent of Britain's miners, but 48 per cent of all UK mining deaths occurred in the region. (Note: There had been major accidents across the Welsh coalfield for more than half a century, including the following incidents, each of which resulted in the loss of more than 100 lives: 1856 Cymmer, 114 dead; 1860 Risca, 142 dead; 1867 Ferndale, 178 dead; 1878 Abercarn, 268 dead; 1880 Risca, 120 dead; 1880 Penygraig, 101 dead; 1890 Llannerch, 176 dead; 1892 Parc Slip, 112 dead; 1894 Albion, Cilfynydd, 290 dead; 1905 Wattstown, 119 dead) As coal output from British collieries reached its peak in 1913 there was a correspondingly large number of accidents around this time.

=== Senghenydd and the Universal Colliery ===
Senghenydd (Welsh: Senghennydd) is situated at the northern end of the Aber Valley, approximately four miles (6.4 km) north-west of Caerphilly and eleven miles (18 km) north-west of Cardiff. When geological surveys for coal began in 1890 it was a farming hamlet of around 100 people. Coal was found, and sinking of the first mineshaft for Universal Colliery—which was owned and developed by William Lewis (Note: The ownership, along with that of other collieries, was through the Lewis Merthyr Consolidated Collieries Ltd.)—began in 1891; the first coal was extracted in 1896. The colliery's two shafts were both 1,950 feet (590 m) deep, the downcast Lancaster and the upcast York. (Note: The downcast shaft provided fresh air in the workings and the upcast shaft carried stale air out of the mine.) Development of the pit coincided with the Boer War, and sectors of the underground workings were named after key places in the war, such as Pretoria, or the lifting of the sieges at Ladysmith, Mafeking and Kimberley.

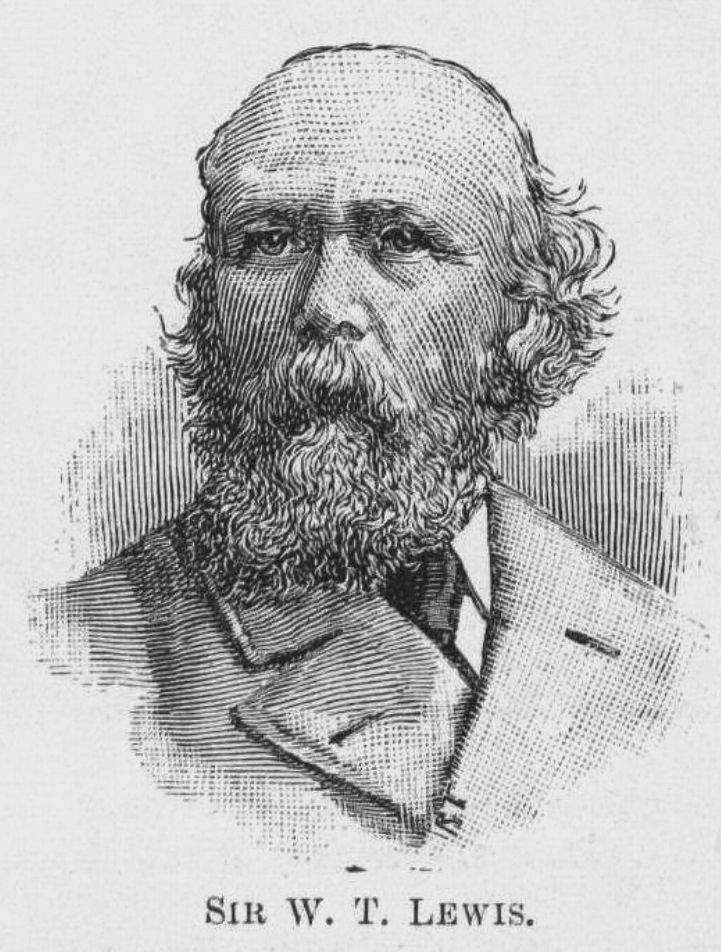
Sir William Lewis in 1891

South Wales miners, including those at Universal, were paid on a rate determined by the Sliding Scale Committee, which fixed wages on the price coal fetched at market. (Note: In 1875 miners' wages for those that worked at collieries controlled by the Monmouthshire and South Wales Coal Owners' Association were pegged to the output of coal and its selling price. The rate was determined by the Sliding Scale Committee, chaired by Lewis. The base line wage was taken from selling price of coal in 1875, and fluctuations in the price of coal on the open market determined subsequent wages.) When the price of coal slumped in the late 1890s, low wages led to industrial unrest and, in 1898, a strike that the men at Universal joined at the end of April. The Monmouthshire and South Wales Coal Owners' Association refused to replace the scale, and the strike ended on 1 September with some small concessions granted by the owners. The colliery resumed production and in 1899 was producing 3,000 long tons (3,000 tonnes; 3,400 short tons) of coal a week.

The industrial historians Helen and Baron Duckham consider Universal Colliery to have been "an unlucky mine". At approximately 5:00 am on 24 May 1901 three underground explosions occurred as the night shift was exiting the pit. Because the explosion damaged the pit winding gear, it took time to clear the debris from the pithead to allow rescuers to begin work. They descended at 11:00 am and rescued one man, an ostler, found alongside the corpse of the horse he was tending. There were no other survivors and 81 men died. The funerals for the victims started four days later, and the rescue and recovery operations lasted for six weeks.

The Mines Inspectorate began an enquiry, chaired by the mining engineer William Galloway. The report was published on 15 July. It stated that the mine was hot with high levels of coal dust present. The method used to load coal onto underground trucks created quantities of dust, which had aggravated a small explosion and created a chain reaction of related explosions throughout the workings. An inquest held in October concluded that various safety precautions had not been followed, and had the mine been sufficiently watered it would have reduced the coal dust held in the air. The colliery had further problems in October 1910 when a heavy roof fall in the Mafeking return released trapped firedamp, which caused the mine to be temporarily evacuated.

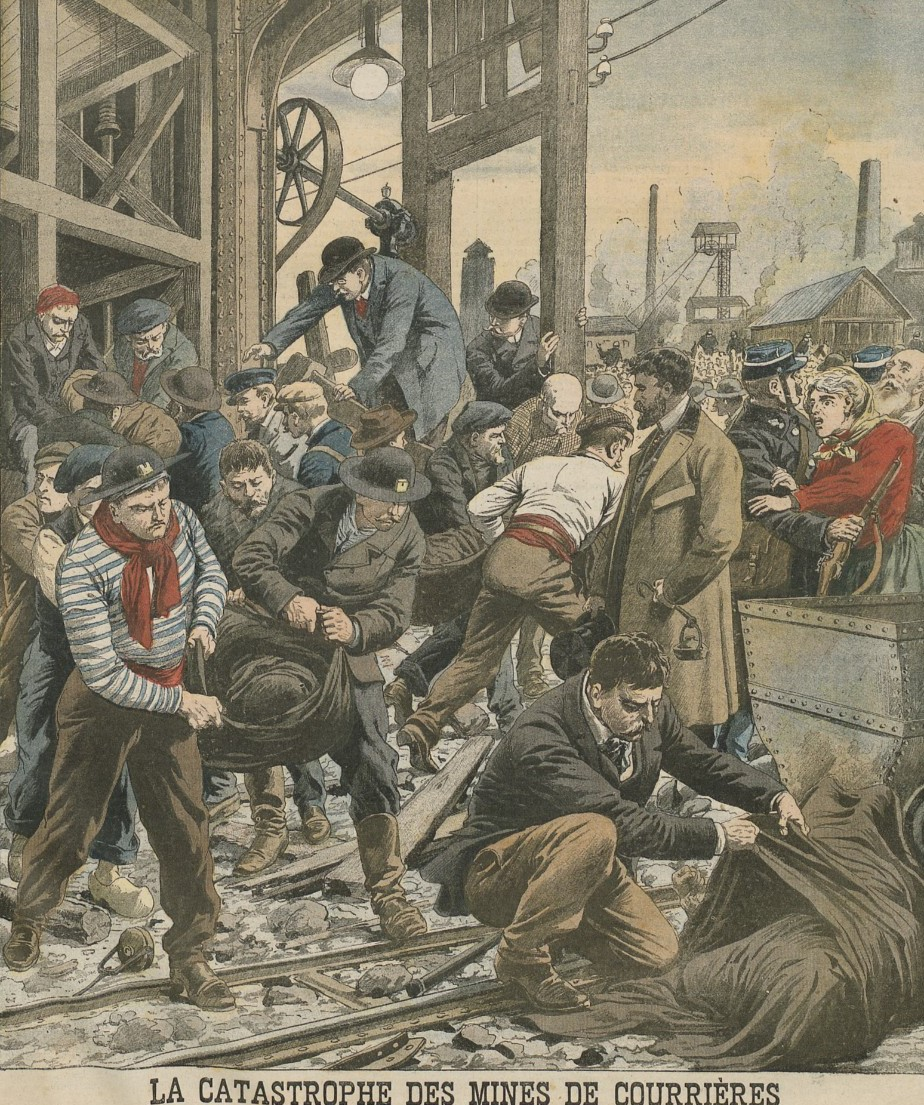
Le Petit Journal illustration of the Courrières mine disaster

In 1906 a major explosion at a colliery in Courrières, northern France, caused the deaths of more than 1,000 miners. The subsequent report blamed the accidental ignition of firedamp, exacerbated by coal dust in the air. Concerned that a similar disaster might happen in British collieries, the Royal Commission was formed, reporting back in 1907, 1909 and 1911. The reports led to the Coal Mines Act 1911, which came into force in December that year. (Note: The same year Lewis was created 1st Baron Merthyr of Senghenydd; the following year he was created a KCVO.) Among other changes to the health and safety culture, the act required that ventilation fans in all collieries be capable of reversing the air current underground; this measure was to be implemented by 1 January 1913.

In 1913 the colliery was producing 1,800 long tons (1,800 tonnes; 2,000 short tons) of coal a day, and Senghenydd's population had grown to just under 6,000. (Note: The 1911 census recorded the population as 5,895.) No work was undertaken at Senghenydd to implement the requirement, and the Mines Inspectorate gave the management an extended deadline of September 1913 to complete the work, but this, too, was missed.

== 14 October 1913 ==
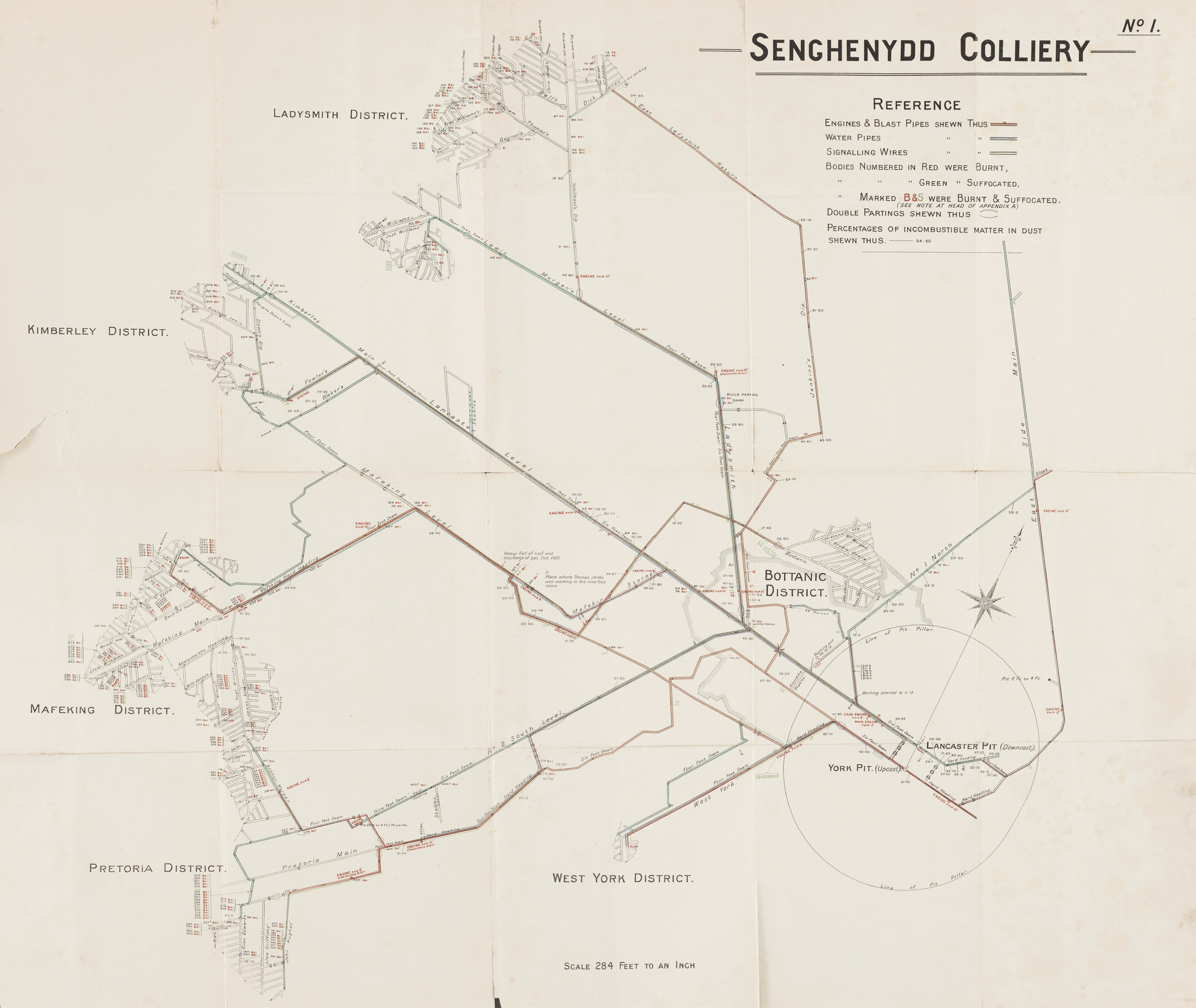
The layout of the Senghenydd mines, showing the location of the victims, and how they had died

At 3:00 am on 14 October 1913, the day-firemen descended the pit to conduct the daily checks for gas; they had three hours to complete their investigations. The firemen for the Mafeking return had to travel more than two miles from the shaft bottom to the workface. It left insufficient time in which to make a thorough check of the workings—which involved placing a naked flame into cavities to see if the flame lengthened—the historian Michael Lieven states that "the company considered any other form of inspection to be too time-consuming". Between 5:10 and 6:00 am 950 men descended the shaft for a shift that was due to last until 2:00 pm.

Just after 8:00 am an explosion occurred in the west side of the underground workings. It is possible there were two explosions as survivors stated a smaller explosion preceded the main one; the official report referred only to one. The cause was probably a build-up of firedamp that was ignited by an electric spark from equipment such as electric bell signalling gear. The initial explosion ignited airborne coal dust, and a shock wave ahead of the explosion raised yet more coal dust, which also combusted. Many victims who were not killed immediately by the explosion and fire died from the effects of afterdamp. The explosive wave travelled up the Lancaster shaft to the surface, destroying the headframe; it killed the winder—the man in charge—and badly injured his deputy.

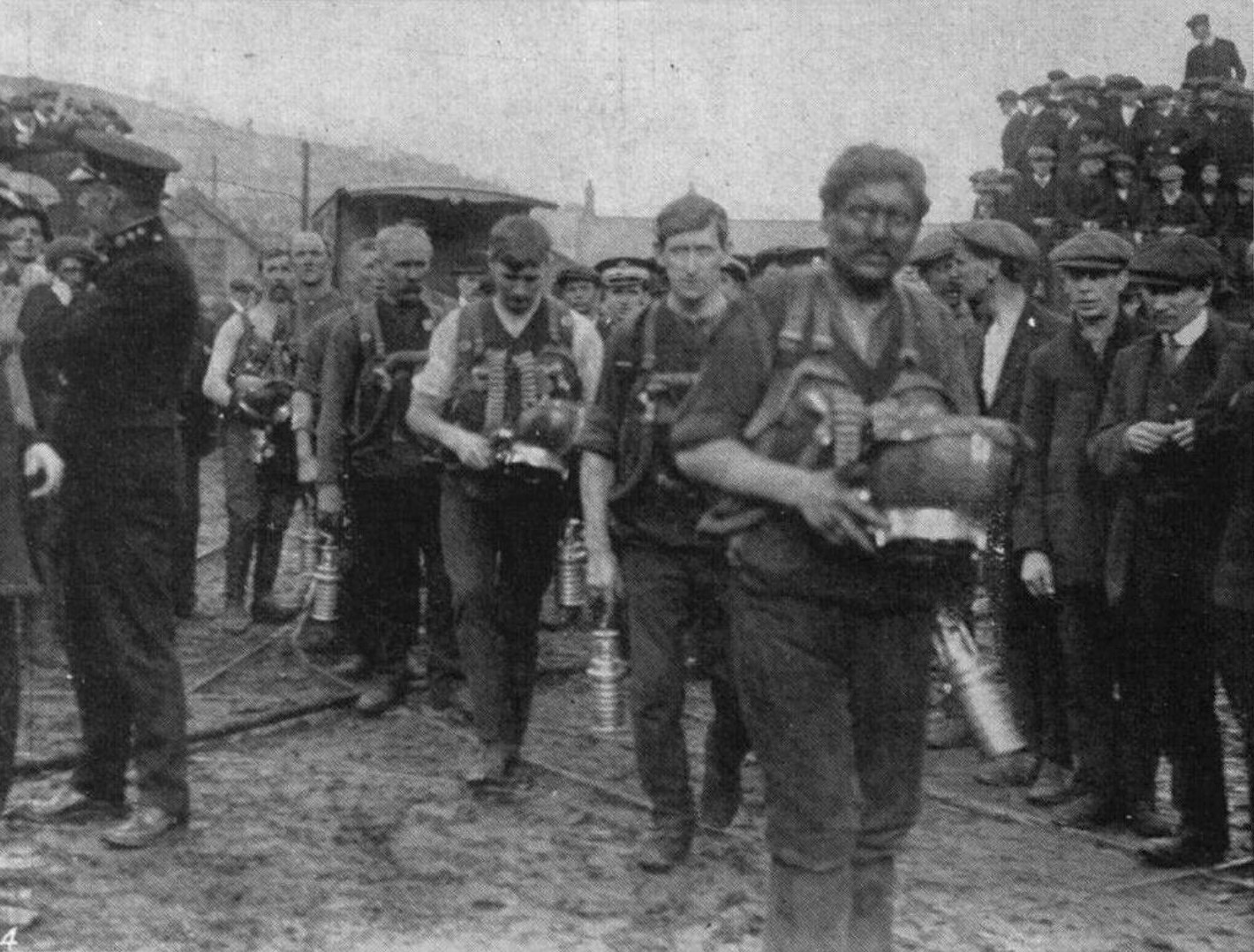
A rescue team leaving the pit

Edward Shaw, the colliery manager, was on the surface and the remaining shift foremen were still underground and unable to give assistance. He took charge and descended the York shaft, accompanied by overman D R Thomas. (Note: The overman was the underground foreman responsible for the infrastructure in the workings: pit props, tramways, roads, etc.) The descent was slow, and they had to clear several girders and obstructions before they reached the bottom. They found that the men from the east side of the workings (approximately 450 workers) were unharmed, and their evacuation was ordered. Shaw and Thomas moved to the western side, where they found other men, alive but injured, and arranged for them to travel to the surface. Thomas later reported that the view into the western workings "was exactly like looking into a furnace".

Shaw explored what he could of the western workings, before he and some of the survivors began tackling the fire. The water pipes from the surface in the Lancaster shaft were all fractured, and hand-extinguishers were used. Shaw returned to the surface at 9:30 am to arrange for rescue and fire-fighting teams from neighbouring collieries. From 11:00 am the specialist mines rescue teams began arriving at the colliery from the Rhymney and Rhondda Valleys, as did Red Cross workers and local ambulance services; a police detachment was sent from Cardiff in a special train. Members of the Inspectorate of Mines were quickly on the scene, and an inspector descended to view the mine the same morning.

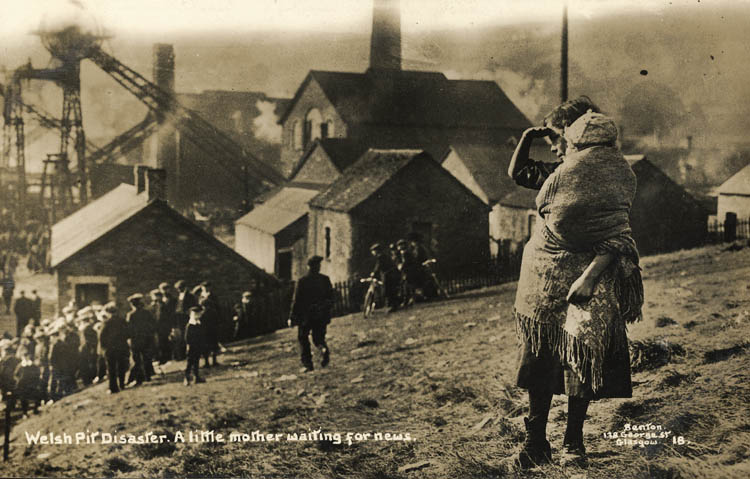
A thirteen-year-old girl awaits news with her baby sister.

Lieven recounts how the rescue parties "in their desperation, ... were reckless with their lives" in their attempts to find survivors; many were injured in small roof collapses, or suffered the effects of carbon monoxide poisoning. Their endeavours saved lives throughout the remainder of the day and into the night, including a group of 18 men found at around 1:00 am. They were the last survivors found. A total of 432 miners had died that day—some bodies were not found until later—and 7 others died later in hospital or at home. A journalist from The Times wrote: "The numbers are truly awful. We talk in awed terms of the decimation of a regiment in a bloody battle, but here a great community engaged in the pursuit of a peaceful vocation is threatened with the loss of at least a quarter of its able bodied manhood". On the surface the townsfolk waited for news; a reporter for The Dundee Courier thought: "the scene at Senghenydd last night was depressing in the extreme. The streets were full of silent throngs of people who moved aimlessly about or stood stolidly at the street corners."

== Rescue, fire-fighting and recovery: 15 October to 30 November ==
Work continued throughout the night of 15 October and into the following day. It focused on finding survivors and fighting the fire that blocked the entry into some workings of the western returns. The fire caused the roof supports to become unstable, and falls triggered outbursts of methane. Several rescuers were injured by the falls, one fatally. Before descending the mine many of the firefighters wrote what they thought might be their last letters home, and some made their wills. As the water pipe in the shaft was out of operation, fire-fighting continued with hand extinguishers and work was only possible in 20-minute shifts. Despite wearing respirators, several rescuers were overcome by the effects of firedamp. During the course of the day, 56 bodies were raised to the surface and, that evening, a new water supply, connected by three-quarters of a mile (1.2 km) of pipes to a nearby reservoir, was installed in the Lancaster shaft.

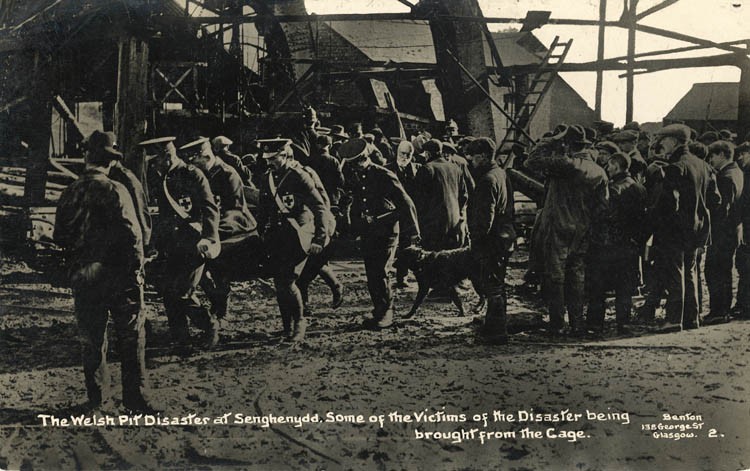
Bringing the bodies out

Reginald McKenna, the Home Secretary, visited the colliery on 15 October representing King George V, who was attending the marriage of Prince Arthur of Connaught and Princess Alexandra, 2nd Duchess of Fife. The king sent a £500 donation to a disaster relief fund; (Note: £500 in 1913 equates to approximately £44,000 in 2016, according to calculations based on Consumer Price Index measure of inflation.) the royal couple displayed their wedding presents at St James's Palace and charged a shilling for entrance, raising £1,200 for the fund. The fund was started by the Lord Mayor of Cardiff; another collection, the Mansion House Fund set up by the Lord Mayor of London, raised more than £3,000 on its first day. (Note: £1,200 in 1913 equates to approximately £105,500 in 2016 and £3,000 in 1913 equates to approximately £264,000, according to calculations based on Consumer Price Index measure of inflation.)

William Brace, the local MP speaking on behalf of the South Wales Miners' Federation, announced on 16 October that the priority would be given to putting out the fire and that no more search parties would be looking for survivors. Brace observed that the fire was blocking the western workings and consuming the oxygen in the air, making it unlikely that anyone was left alive. Progress in tackling the fire over the previous days had been slow, and it had only been extinguished in the first 30 yards of the roadway—still two miles (3.2 km) from the coal face. Two coroner's inquests were opened: one in Senghenydd for the men who died in the colliery, and one in Cardiff for those who had died in hospital; both were adjourned the same day. (Note: There are several grounds upon which an inquest can be adjourned, including the possibility of a public enquiry or if criminal proceedings are pending. An adjourned inquest does not have to be resumed, and the decision is at the discretion of the coroner.) The first funerals took place the following day, Friday 17 October. An estimated 150,000 mourners gathered for the 11 men buried on the Saturday and 8 on the Sunday.

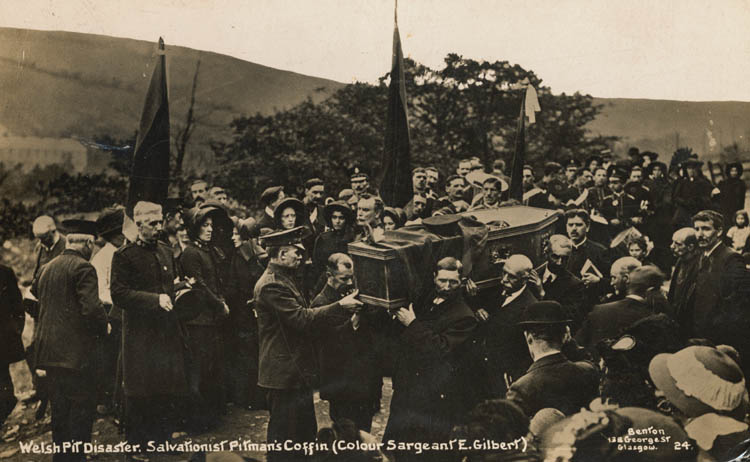
The funeral of one of the miners, E. Gilbert, a colour sergeant in The Salvation Army

The firefighters built bashings, walls of sandbags, turf and sand, approximately 18 feet (5.5 metres) deep and 17 feet (5.2 metres) up to the tunnel's roof to prevent smoke filling the rest of the workings and allow men to explore areas previously cut off. Within two days the temperatures dropped and the volume of smoke was reduced. The fire was contained, but miners still faced several obstacles, including roof collapses and large pockets of trapped firedamp. The first collapse consisted of more than 100 tons of debris; another fall was more than 300 feet (91.5 metres) long and 30 to 40 feet (10–12 metres) high. Clearing the falls and finding bodies was slow, and it took until 8 November for the first of the four working districts to be explored and cleared of bodies. The explosion, fire and subsequent decomposition made it difficult to identify many victims; some had to be identified by their personal effects, and some bodies remained unidentified.

By 17 November the Mafeking and Pretoria districts had been fully explored, with more than 200 bodies raised to the surface in the preceding two days. On 20 November an official announcement reported that 439 miners had died, of whom 33 were still unaccounted for. Toward the end of the month, the men voted to return to work, even though the western workings were still out of action and 11 bodies were still missing.

A photographer, W. Benton, took a series of photographs as the disaster unfolded, and later published them as a set of postcards. Their publication is described by the National Library of Wales as "an excellent example of early photo-journalism". The photographs came with a caption, shown below:

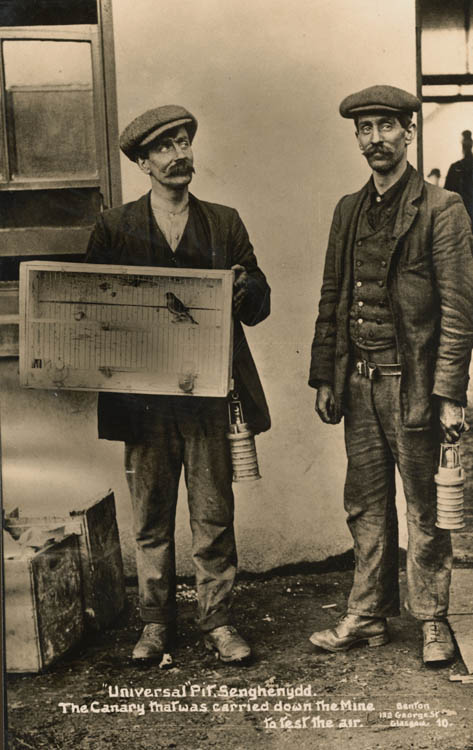
"The canary that was carried down the mine to test the air"

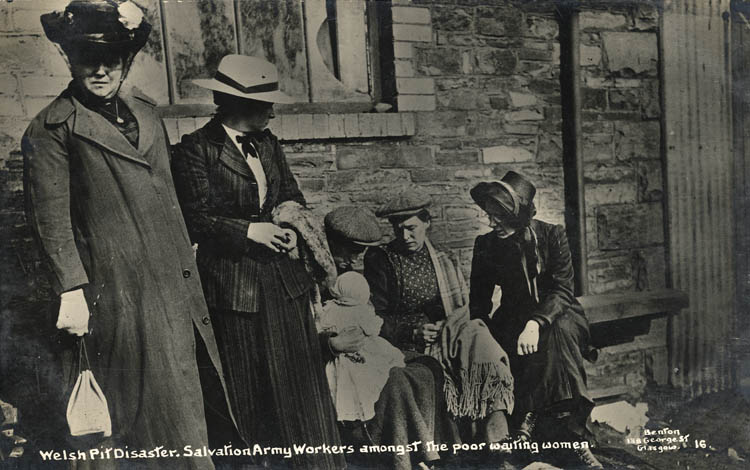
"Salvation Army workers amongst the poor waiting women"

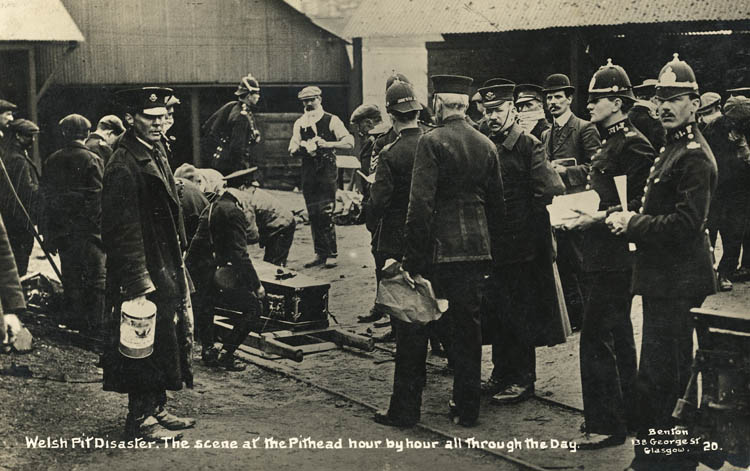
"The scene at the pithead hour by hour all through the day"

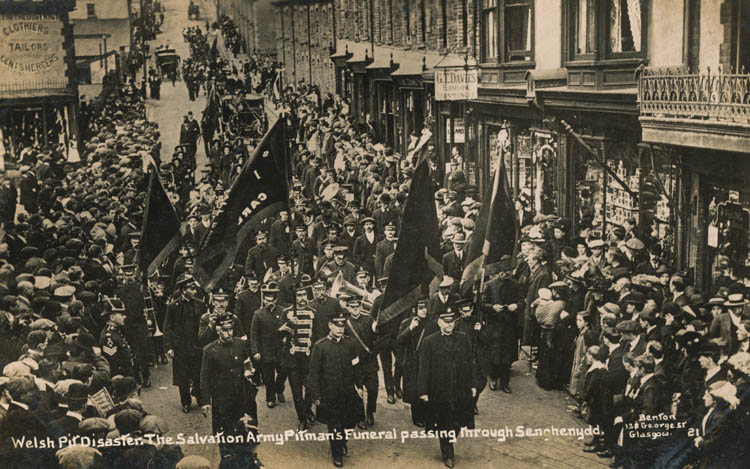
"The Salvation Army pit man's funeral passing through Senghenydd"

== Aftermath ==
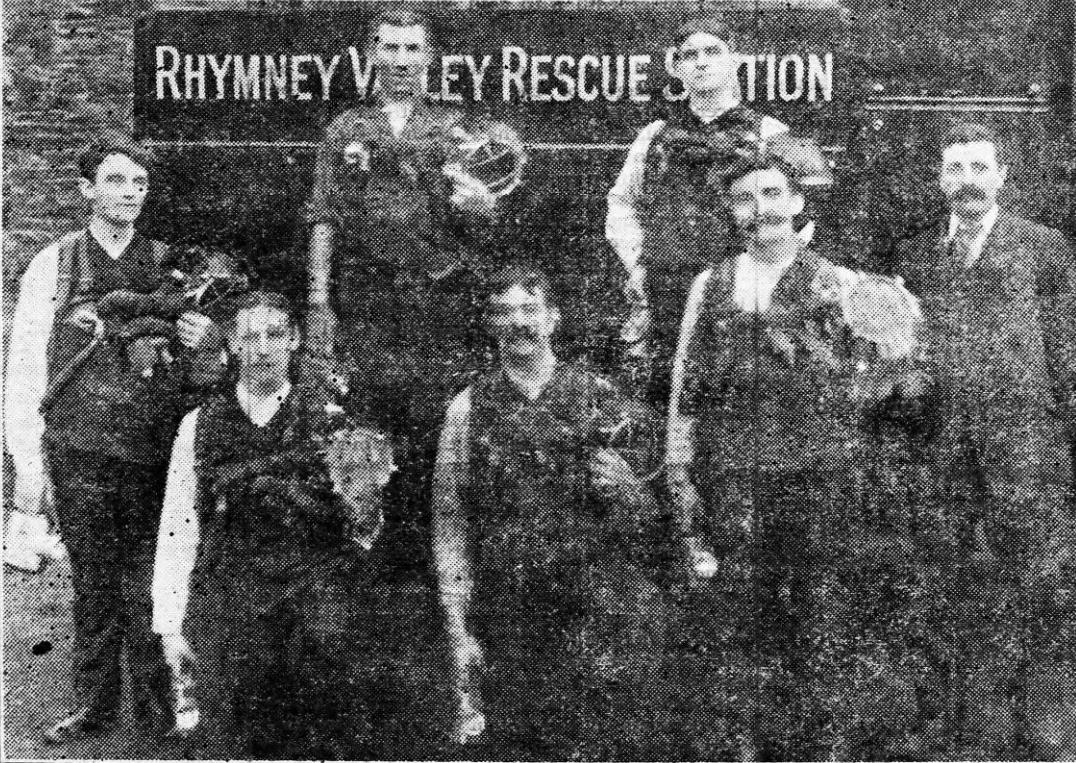
Rescuers from Rhymney on their return home

The Senghenydd explosion remains the worst mining disaster in Britain. The deaths of 440 men from a small community had a devastating effect; 60 victims were younger than 20, of whom 8 were 14 years old; 542 children had lost their fathers and 205 women were widowed. The impact on individual households was great: 12 homes lost both a father and son, 10 homes lost 2 sons each, while the death of one father and son left an 18-year-old daughter to raise her 6 siblings alone; another woman lost her husband, 2 sons, a brother and her lodger.

The inquiry into the disaster opened on 2 January 1914 with Richard Redmayne, the Chief Inspector of Mines, as the commissioner; he was assisted by two assessors, Evan Williams, the chairman of the South Wales and Monmouthshire Coal Owners Association, and Robert Smillie, the president of the Miners' Federation of Great Britain. The inquiry ran for three days before being adjourned to allow for the coroner's inquest to run at Senghenydd. It reopened on 27 January and ran until 21 February. Over the 13 days it heard evidence, 21,837 questions were put to 50 witnesses. The coroner's inquest, chaired by David Rees, lasted for 5 days from 5 January 1914. A total of 9,000 questions were put to 50 witnesses, and the jury returned verdicts of accidental death.

The inquiry report failed to identify a definite cause, but it was considered that the most likely cause was a spark from the signalling gear. It would have ignited the firedamp, exacerbated and fuelled by coal dust in the air. The report was critical of many aspects of the management's practices, and considered it had breached the mining regulations in respect of measuring and maintaining the air quality in the workings, and in the removal of coal dust from the tracks and walkways. The report pointed out that because the management had not implemented the changes needed to the ventilation fans as demanded by the Coal Mines Act 1911, the fans were unable to reverse the direction of the airflow, which would have blown the smoke out through the Lancaster shaft; Redmayne and his colleagues held differing opinions on the advisability of reversing or stopping the airflow. The historian John H Brown, in his examination of the disaster, states that had the airflow been reversed, firedamp or afterdamp could have been extracted from some sectors into the blaze, causing another explosion.

Further criticism was directed toward the emergency procedures. The lack of respirators at the mine was deemed to have cost lives. The lack of an adequate water supply for fire fighting was criticised, and Redmayne wrote: "I should have thought, in view of the fact that the colliery was such a gassy one, and it had already been devastated by an explosion, that the management would have made arrangements for a supply of water adequate to meet an emergency of the kind that actually occurred."

Shaw's actions were described by Lieven as those that "gained him a degree of respect from the local mining community which remained over the years; they probably also cost the lives of scores of miners." The Duckhams describe Shaw's inaction in fixing the ventilation fan before the explosion, as well as his delay in sending for assistance from rescue teams until he exited the mine an hour and a half after the explosion. The official report considered there had been a "disquieting laxity in the management of the mine", although Shaw was described by the Duckhams as "undoubtedly a highly capable manager". The report led to Shaw being charged with 17 breaches of the Mines Act 1911, and four charges were made against the company. Shaw was found guilty of failing to keep adequate environmental records and failing to replace a broken lamp locker; he was fined £24. The company was convicted of failing to provide a ventilation system that could reverse the airflow and was fined £10 with £5 5 shillings costs. (Note: £24 in 1914 equates to approximately £2,000 in 2016; £10 in 1914 equates to £860, and £5 in 1914 equates to approximately £430, according to calculations based on Consumer Price Index measure of inflation.) One newspaper, the Merthyr Pioneer, calculated "Miners' Lives at 1/1 1/4 each" (1 shilling 1 1/4d or £13 in 2025). (Note: The Merthyr Pioneer was a socialist newspaper whose Welsh editor was the radical Thomas Evan Nicholas. The paper was founded by Keir Hardie, who visited the colliery after the explosion, and had gone down the pit with one of the rescue crews.)

After it reopened the colliery never reached the same levels of employment as before the explosion. William Lewis died in August 1914; Shaw continued as manager of the mine until November 1928, when it closed.

Local memorials

The Senghenydd mining disaster memorial, unveiled in 1981

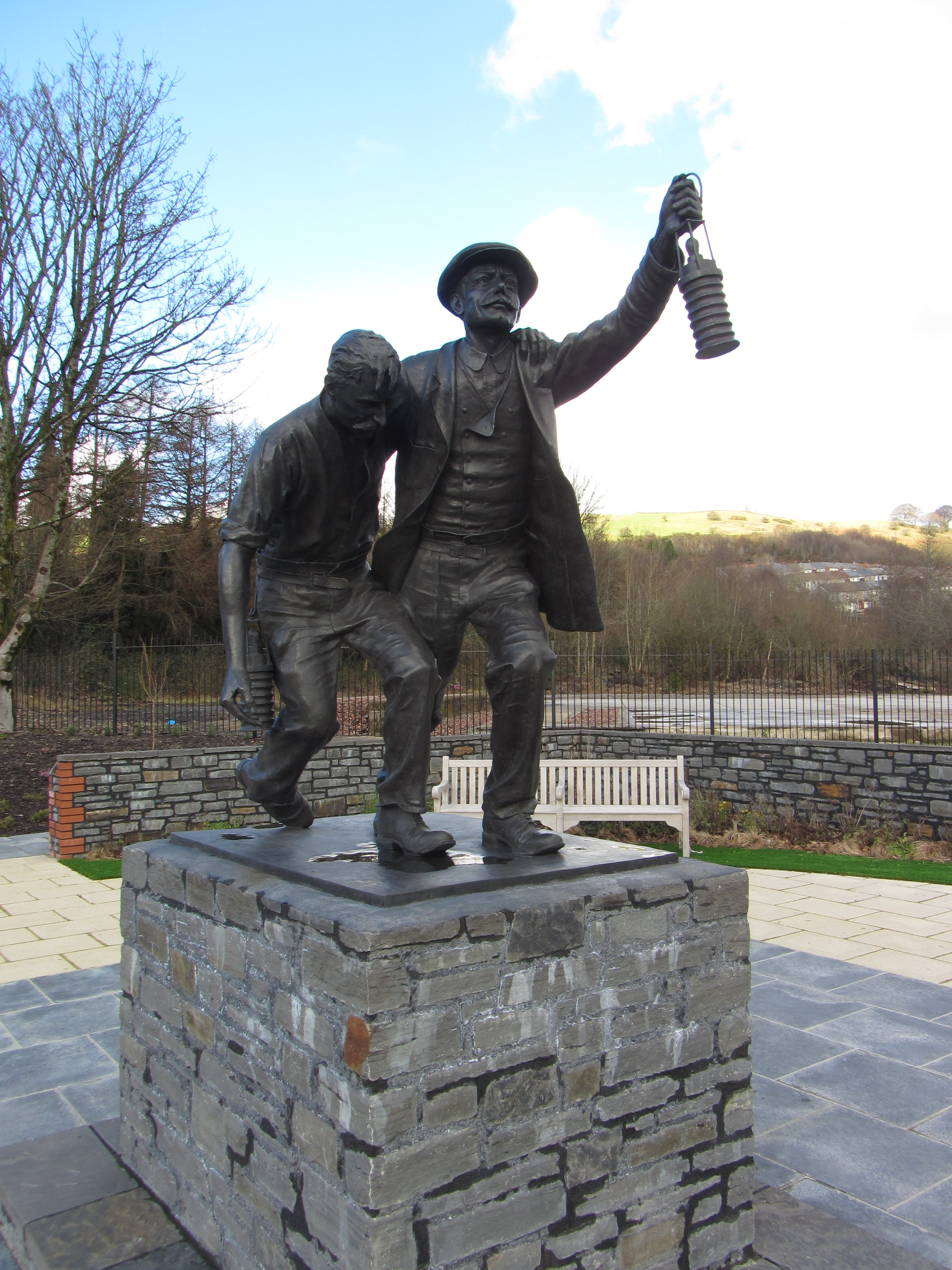
The Welsh National Coal Mining Memorial, 2013, by Les Johnson

A stage play based on the disaster, by the journalist and broadcaster Margaret Coles, was first performed at the Sherman Cymru, Cardiff in 1991. The disaster at Senghenydd has provided the backdrop to two printed works of historical fiction: Alexander Cordell's This Sweet and Bitter Earth (1977) and Cwmwl dros y Cwm (2013) by Gareth F. Williams.

In 1981 a memorial to those lost in the disaster was unveiled by the National Coal Board. Based outside Nant-y-parc Primary School, which is built on the site of the former colliery, the monument is a 20 feet (6 m) high replica of the colliery's winding gear.

On 14 October 2013, the centenary of the disaster, a Welsh national memorial to all mining disasters was unveiled at the former pithead. Funded by the Aber Valley Heritage Group and their patron Roy Noble, with matched funding from the Welsh Government, a bronze statue by Les Johnson depicting a rescue worker coming to the aid of one of the survivors of the explosion, was unveiled by Carwyn Jones, the First Minister of Wales. Jones said: "Mining is central to the story of Wales. It has shaped our history and communities and its social and physical legacy is still with us to this day. ... It is only right that we have a permanent memorial." In March 2024 the memorial garden was added to the Cadw/ICOMOS Register of Parks and Gardens of Special Historic Interest in Wales.

== See also ==
- Glossary of coal mining terminology
- History of coal mining
- List of disasters in Great Britain and Ireland by death toll

== Notes and references ==
=== Sources ===
- Benn, Caroline (1992). Kier Hardie. London: Longman. ISBN 978-0-09-175343-6.
- Benson, John (1989). British Coalminers in the Nineteenth Century. London: Longman. ISBN 978-0-582-08340-0.
- Brown, John H. (2009). The Valley of the Shadow: An account of Britain's worst mining disaster, the Senghennydd explosion. Port Talbot, West Glamorgan: Alun Books. ISBN 978-0-907117-06-3.
- Bulmer, Martin (2015). Mining and Social Change (Routledge Revivals): Durham County in the Twentieth Century. London: Routledge. ISBN 978-1-317-44848-8.
- Clark, Gregory (2018). "The Annual RPI and Average Earnings for Britain, 1209 to Present (New Series)". MeasuringWorth.
- Davies, John (2007). A History of Wales. London: Penguin Books. ISBN 978-0-14-028475-1.
- Duckham, Helen; Duckham, Baron (1973). Great Pit Disasters: Great Britain 1700 to the present day. Newton Abbot, Devon: David & Charles. ISBN 978-0-7153-5717-0.
- Gresley, William Stukeley (1883). A Glossary of Terms Used in Coal Mining. London: E. & F.N. Spon. OCLC 4977405.
- Ingman, Terence (2011). The English Legal Process. Oxford: Oxford University Press. ISBN 978-0-19-958194-8.
- Jain, Ravi K.; Cui, Zengdi; Domen, Jeremy K (2015). Environmental Impact of Mining and Mineral Processing: Management, Monitoring, and Auditing Strategies. Oxford: Elsevier Science. ISBN 978-0-12-804092-8.
- Lieven, Michal (1994). Senghennydd, The Universal Pit Village. Llandysul, Dyfed: Gwasg Gomer Press. ISBN 978-1-85902-043-2.
- Llywelyn, Jen (2013). Remember Senghenydd – The Colliery Disaster of 1913. Llanrwst, Wales: Gwasg Carreg Gwalch. ISBN 978-1-84524-208-4.
- Redmayne, R. A. S.; Williams, Evan; Smillie, Robert (1914). Causes of and Circumstance Attending the Explosion Which Occurred at the Senghenydd Colliery on Tuesday 14th October, 1913 (PDF). London: Her Majesty's Stationery Office. OCLC 781406776 – via Wikimedia Commons.
- Schernikau, Lars (2010). Economics of the International Coal Trade: The Renaissance of Steam Coal. Dordrecht, Netherlands: Springer Science & Business Media. ISBN 978-90-481-9240-3.
- Thompson, F. M. L. (1993). The Cambridge Social History of Britain, 1750–1950. Cambridge: Cambridge University Press. ISBN 978-0-521-43816-2.
- Williams, John (2004). "Lewis, William Thomas, first Baron Merthyr (1837–1914)". Oxford Dictionary of National Biography (online ed.). Oxford University Press. doi:10.1093/ref:odnb/34523. (Subscription, Wikipedia Library access or UK public library membership required.)
