= Lew Jenkins (rugby union) =

- Full name: Lewis Jenkins
- Born: 8 November 1894 Eglwysilan, Wales
- Died: 4 July 1973 (aged 78) Coventry, England

Rugby union career
- Position: Lock
International career
Years	Team	Apps	(Points)
1923	Wales	2	(0)

Lewis Jenkins (8 November 1894 – 4 July 1973) was a Welsh international rugby union player.

Jenkins was raised in Senghenydd and served with the Welch Regiment during World War I.

A forward, Jenkins competed for Aberavon, Cardiff and Pontypool. He gained a Wales call up in the 1923 Five Nations and became the first person from the Aber Valley to be capped for Wales. Initially a reserve, Jenkins came into the XV for Wales' second fixture against Scotland, replacing Joe Thompson who had crossed to rugby league. He retained his place for their following match, a win over France at Swansea.

== See also ==
- List of Wales national rugby union players
