= Cefn Eglwysilan =

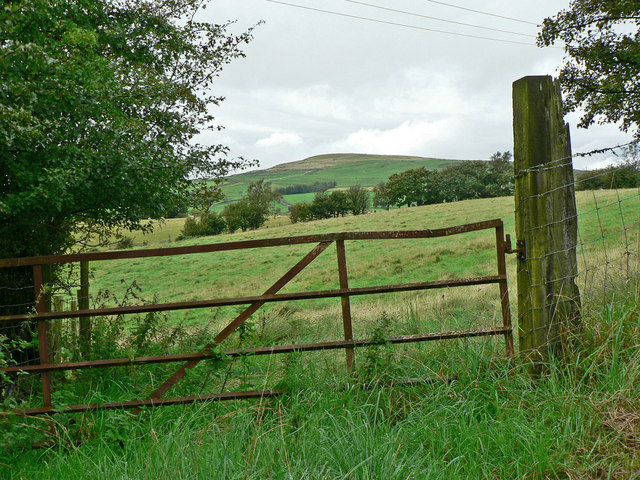
- View towards Cefn Eglwysilan

Highest point
- Elevation: 382 m (1,253 ft)
- Prominence: 235 m (771 ft)
- Listing: Marilyn
- Coordinates: 51.6061°N 3.3052°W

Naming
- English translation: back (ridge) of Ilan’s church
- Language of name: Welsh

Geography
- Location: Caerphilly/Rhondda Cynon Taf, Wales
- OS grid: ST 097905
- Topo map: OS Landranger 171 / Explorer 166

Cefn Eglwysilan is a hill in South Wales, the twin 382m summits of which lie 2 km east of Pontypridd in Rhondda Cynon Taf county borough. Its eastern side lies within the community of Aber Valley in Caerphilly county borough. Like neighbouring Mynydd Eglwysilan, the hill is named after the hamlet of Eglwysilan, the church here being dedicated to an obscure saint Ilan. A wireless transmission station is sited on the more northerly of the two summits (at OS grid ref ST 099911). The southerly one is crowned by a trig point.

== Geology ==
The hill is formed from the Hughes Sandstone (formally the ‘Hughes Member’ and formerly the ‘Hughes Beds’) of the Pennant Sandstone Formation laid down late in the Carboniferous Period (c 309-306 million years ago). Siltstones and mudstones appear beneath the main upper bed of sandstone.

== Archaeology ==
The linear earthwork known as Senghenydd Dyke stretches across the eastern side of the hill. It is considered to mark the edge of an extensive 13th century deer park associated with nearby Caerphilly Castle. Three cross dykes also sit on the summit plateau and further earthworks are evident on its southern flank. A cairn known as Garnedd Lwyd sits beside the main dyke at OS grid ref ST 107903 and there are further cairns known as Garneddi Llwydion at ST 104918 again beside the Senghenydd Dyke.

== Access ==
The summit plateau of the hill is mapped as open access and thereby freely available for the public to walk. In addition there are a couple of byways running across the hill linking the minor Eglwysilan Road with the road between Nelson and Senghenydd. The Rhymney Valley Ridgeway Walk follows one of these byways along the eastern edge of the summit plateau.
