= MAGB =

MAGB may refer to:

- Mining Association of Great Britain
- Monarch Academy Glen Burnie
