= Welsh National and Universal Mining Disaster Memorial Garden =

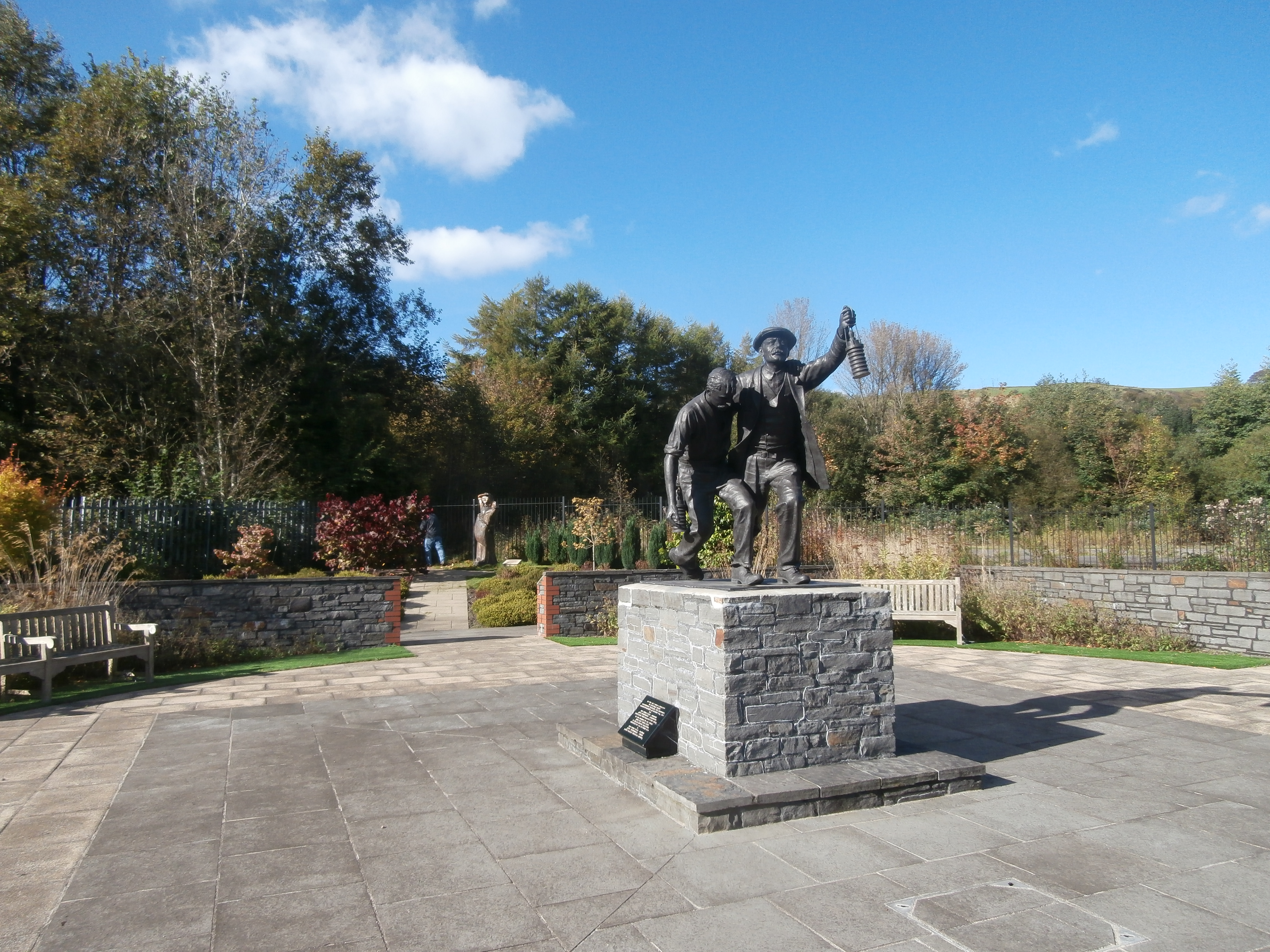
- "an important site of public commemoration and memory"

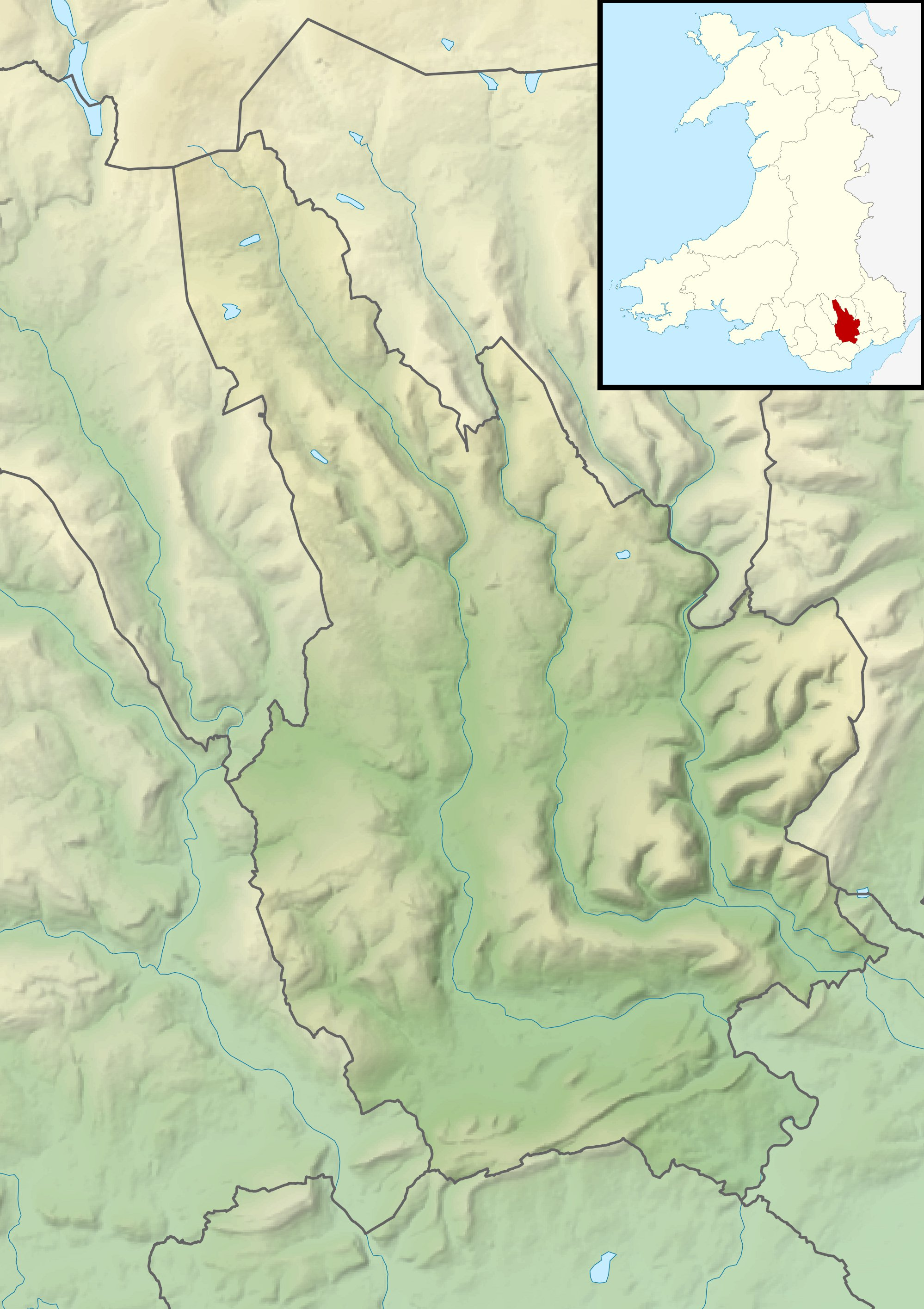
- Location within Caerphilly
- 51.611735°N 3.2807925°W
- Type: Memorial garden
- Location: Senghenydd, Caerphilly, Wales

Cadw/ICOMOS Register of Parks and Gardens of Special Historic Interest in Wales
- Official name: Welsh National and Universal Mining Disaster Memorial Garden
- Designated: 12 March 2024
- Reference no.: PGW(Gm)78(CAE)
- Listing: Grade II

The Welsh National and Universal Mining Disaster Memorial Garden at Senghenydd, Caerphilly, commemorates the 439 men killed in the Senghenydd colliery disaster of 1913, the worst mining accident in British history; the 81 lives lost in an earlier pit explosion at Senghenydd in 1901; and acts as a national memorial to all of the dead of the 152 mining disasters that have occurred in Wales. The garden was opened in 2013, the centenary of the 1913 event. In March 2024 Cadw added the garden to its Cadw/ICOMOS Register of Parks and Gardens of Special Historic Interest in Wales. Its listing record describes the garden as "an important site of public commemoration and memory".

== History and description ==
The Universal Colliery at Senghenydd was in operation from 1893 to 1928. An important mine within the South Wales Coalfield, at its peak of production during the First World War it was supplying 10,000 tons of coal a week to fuel the British Grand Fleet based at Scapa Flow. An explosion at the mine in May 1901 saw the deaths of 81 men. An even greater explosion in the mine on 14 October 1913 became the greatest colliery disaster in British mining history, with the loss of 439 men and boys. The subsequent government inquiry, which saw the mine manager fined £24 and the colliery owners £10, caused great bitterness. (Note: Although the low level of the fines imposed caused public anger and derision, the inquiry did lead to important improvements in mine safety practices in subsequent decades.)

A memorial to the Universal Colliery disasters was unveiled on 14 October 1981 at the gates of the Nant-y-Parc Primary School. The National Mining Memorial was unveiled at a ceremony on 14 October 2013, the centenary of the 1913 disaster. The memorial takes the form of a bronze sculpture, by Les Johnson, depicting a miner leading another to safety. (Note: Johnson’s other commissions include the statue commemorating Keith Park in Waterloo Place and that celebrating Brian Clough in Nottingham.) The surrounding garden, designed by Stephanie Wilkins, includes a remembrance wall and a memory path commemorating the dead of the 152 mining disasters in Wales. The 521 clay tiles commemorating individual losses were made by Ned Heywood and Julia Land, ceramic artists from Chepstow. (Note: Heywood and Land also produce the blue plaques used for commemorations by English Heritage.)

The garden is registered at Grade II on the Cadw/ICOMOS Register of Parks and Gardens of Special Historic Interest in Wales. (Note: The listing of the garden, on 12 March 2024, made it the most recent addition to the Cadw/ICOMOS Register of Parks and Gardens of Special Historic Interest in Wales, bringing the total number of registered parks and gardens in Wales to 385.) At the time of its listing, the then First Minister of Wales Mark Drakeford said, "the legacy of coal is still an essential part of our history. It is only right that a site of such symbolic importance as Wales’ National Mining Memorial receives formal recognition". Cadw's listing record for the site describes it as "an important site of public commemoration and memory".

== Gallery ==
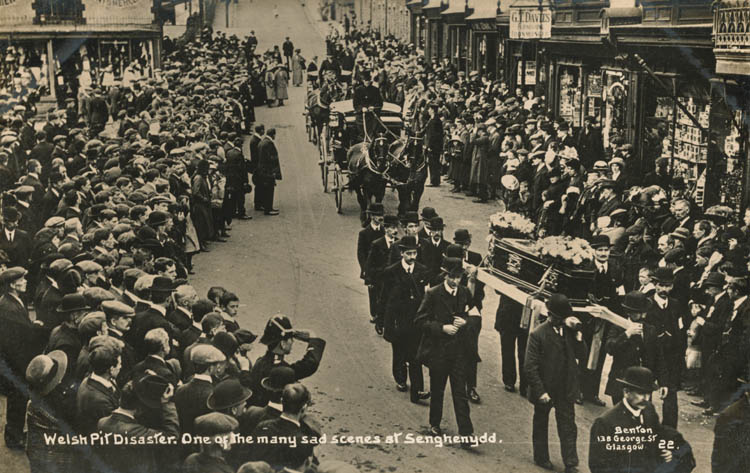
Postcard of 1913 showing a funeral procession through Senghenydd

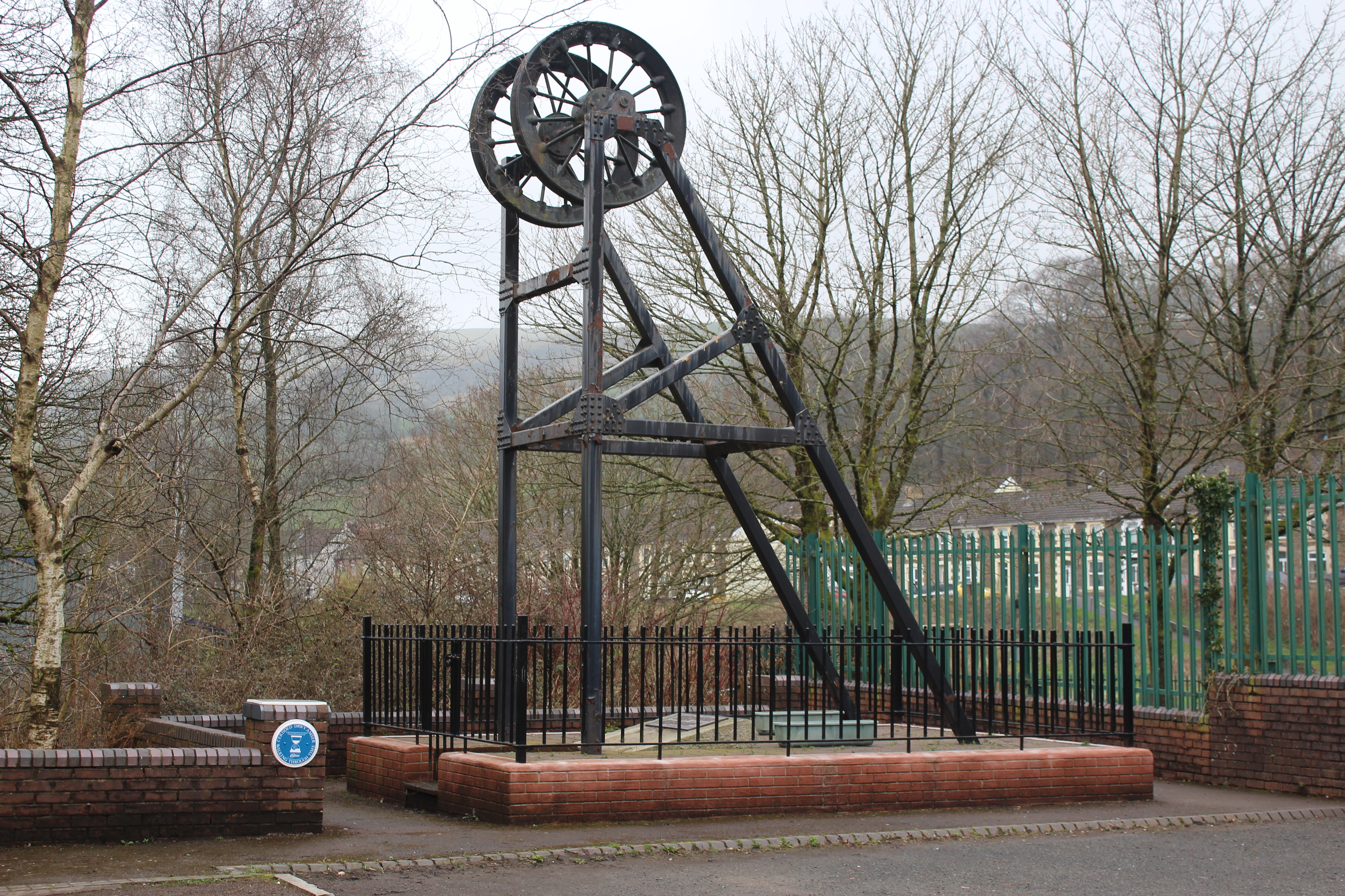
The 1981 memorial

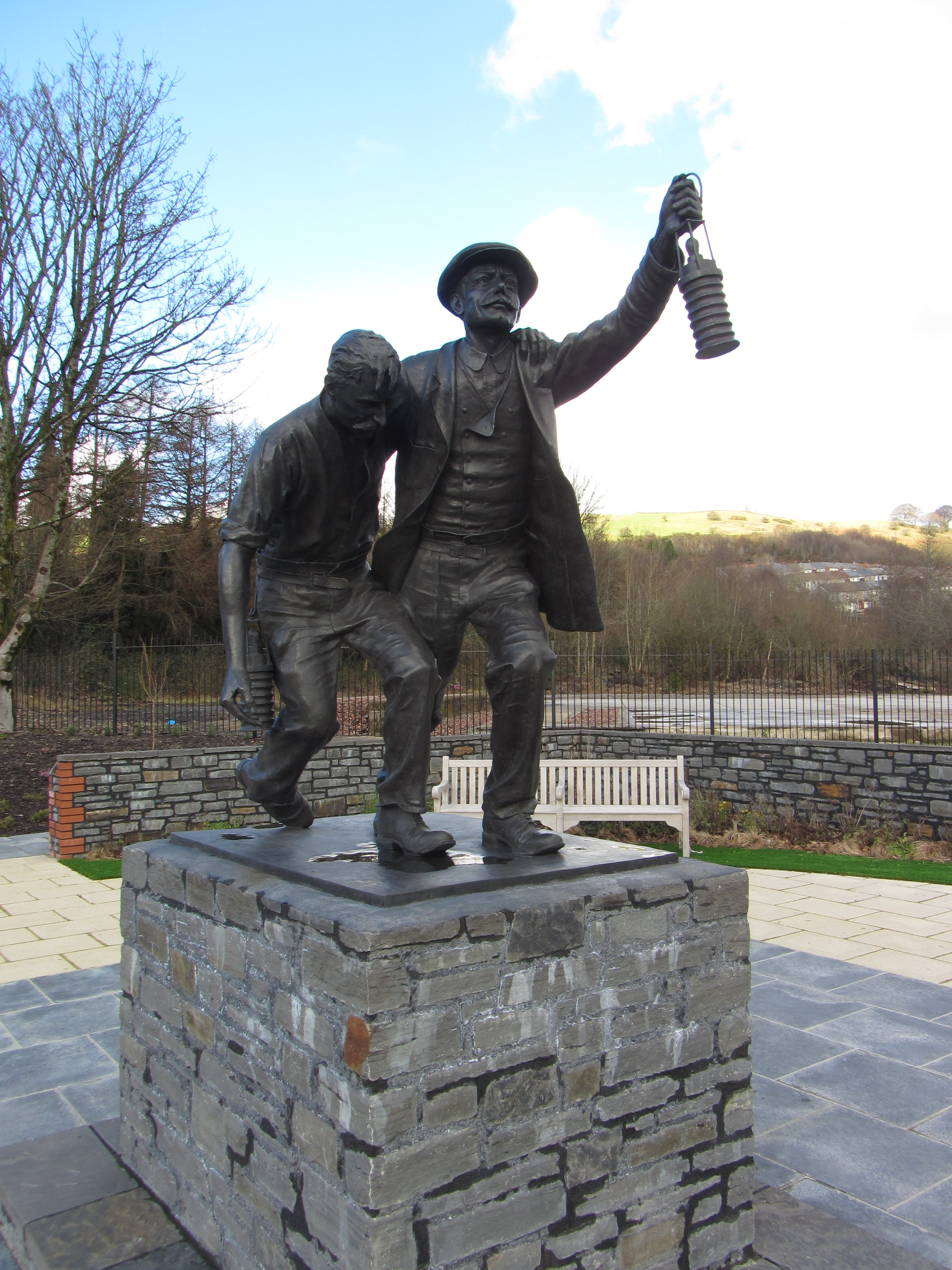
The Welsh National Mining Memorial (2013)

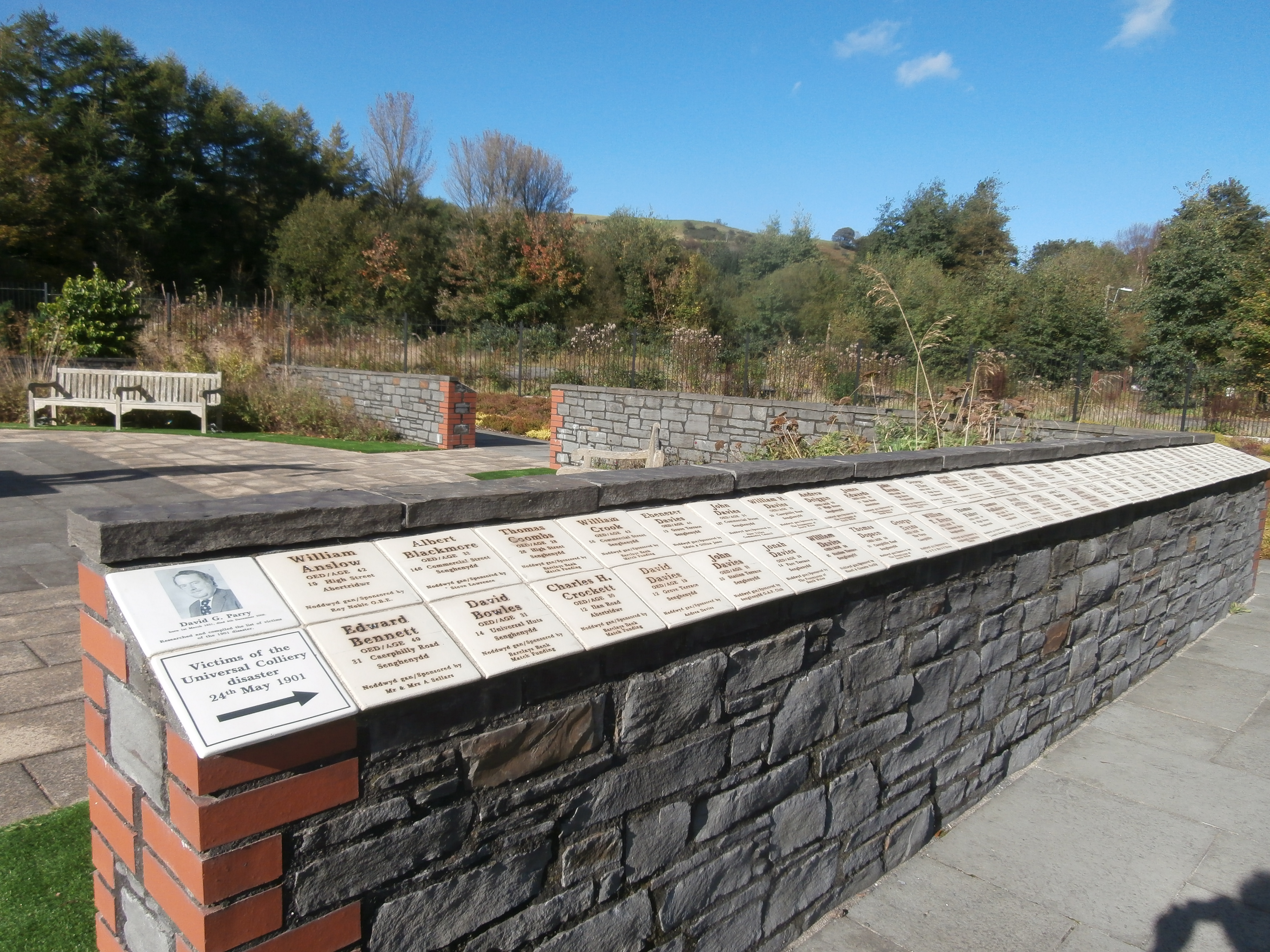
The remembrance wall

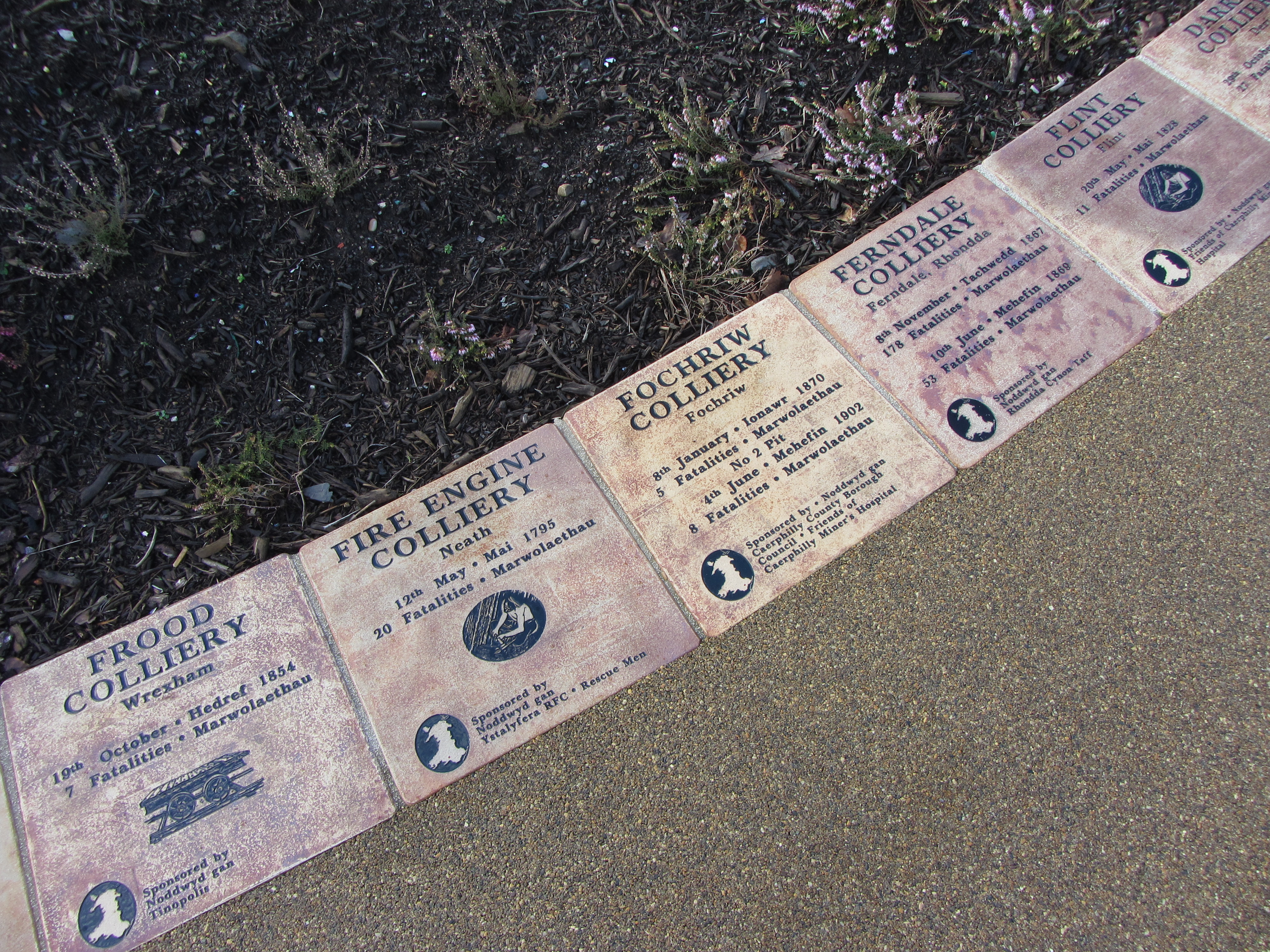
Part of the path of memory
