= Mynydd Eglwysilan =

Highest point
- Elevation: 355 m (1,165 ft)
- Prominence: 38 m (125 ft)
- Coordinates: 51.6254°N 3.2676°W

Naming
- English translation: hill of Ilan’s church
- Language of name: Welsh

Geography
- Location: Caerphilly, Wales
- OS grid: ST 123926
- Topo map: OS Landranger 171 / Explorer 166

Mynydd Eglwysilan is a 355-metre-high hill in the Caerphilly county borough in South Wales 3 km to the south of Nelson and a similar distance southwest of Ystrad Mynach. To its south is Senghenydd at the head of the Aber Valley. Like neighbouring Cefn Eglwysilan, the hill is named after the hamlet of Eglwysilan 4 km to the southwest, the church here being dedicated to an obscure Saint Ilan. Remains of a linear earthwork known as Senghenydd Dyke stretch across the southern side of the hill. It is considered to mark the edge of an extensive 13th-century deer park associated with nearby Caerphilly Castle.

== Geology ==
The hill is formed from the Hughes Sandstone (formally the ‘Hughes Member’ and formerly the ‘Hughes Beds’) of the Pennant Sandstone Formation laid down late in the Carboniferous Period (c. 309–306 million years ago). Siltstones and mudstones appear beneath the main upper bed of sandstone.

== Access ==
The summit area of the hill is mapped as open access under the Countryside and Rights of Way Act 2000 thereby giving walkers freedom to explore it on foot. There are additionally a couple of byways which traverse the eastern and southern margins of the summit plateau. The unfenced minor public road from Nelson to Senghenydd runs along the northwestern margin of the hill. A rough track passes by the trig point which marks the summit.
