= Windsor Colliery =

Coordinates: 51.6004°N 3.2736°W

Windsor Colliery was a coal mine in the village of Abertridwr, Caerphilly.

Opened in 1895, it amalgamated with the Nantgarw Colliery in 1974, and closed in 1986. Ty'n y Parc (Welsh for "house on the park") housing estate now occupies the site.

== Development ==
The sinking of two shafts of the Windsor Colliery commenced in 1895 by the Windsor Colliery Co. Ltd, to a depth of around 2,018 feet. The first coal was raised in 1902, with the workings connected underground to the Universal Colliery in Senghenydd for ventilation purposes. The mine was serviced by the Senghenydd branch line of the Rhymney Railway.

== Accident ==
On 1 June 1902, a platform collapsed in the mine, tipping nine men into 25 feet of water, which had gathered in the sump. Three managed to escape drowning by clinging onto floating debris, but the other six lost their lives.

On the 8th April 1910 Thomas Isaac a Haulier at the mine was suffocated - Death certificate says Suffocation due to fall of rubble. The UK, Coal Mining Accidents and Deaths Index, 1878-1951 explains the death as follows - Fall of Roof on Horse Road Along Which He Was Passing With A Horse and Train. Several Settings of Timber Were Discharged By the Fall.

== Operations ==
The colliery suffered from the 1920s economic downturn, as manpower slipped from 2,550 men in 1925 (the same year as maximum output of 2,550 tons of coal) to 860 ten years later. As a result, the colliery was taken over in the early 1930s by Powell Duffryn Steam Coal Company. Ownership passed to the National Coal Board in 1946.

During 1976, it became linked underground to the Nantgarw Colliery, and both collieries were worked as one unit, with coal winding and processing via Nantgarw. The majority of the Windsor work force transferred to Nantgarw on the last shift before the miners' summer holidays in 1976, but coal was still being raised in Windsor until the Christmas holiday. Production was later concentrated at Nantgarw, with Windsor kept open for ventilation, methane extraction and an emergency way out.

== Closure ==
The whole Nantgarw/Windsor unit closed 6 November 1986.
