= Trevor Evans (journalist) =

Welsh journalist (1902-1981)

- Born: Trevor Maldwyn Evans; 21 February 1902; Abertridwr, Glamorganshire, Wales
- Died: 10 June 1981 (aged 79)
- Occupation: Journalist
- Spouse: Margaret Speers Gribbin
- Children: 2; including Marilyn

Sir Trevor Maldwyn Evans CBE (21 February 1902 – 10 June 1981) was a Welsh journalist and the industrial correspondent for The Daily Express. Born in Abertridwr, Glamorganshire, he started life as a miner and electrician but entered journalism after losing his job during the 1921 miner's strike.

== Biography ==
Evans was born in Abertridwr, Glamorgan on 21 February 1902. His father, Samuel Evans, was a police sergeant and his mother was Margaret Jones.

He attended Pontypridd Grammar School until he was fifteen, when his father was killed in an accident at a railway crossing. Instead of training to become a teacher, he started work as a miner at the local mine. In 1921, he started training as an electrician during a miners strike, and attended night school. Soon after, he started training as to become a teacher while working as a freelance reporter for Glamorgan Free Press.

Over the course of the following years, he worked multiple newspapers, Daily Dispatch in 1926, Daily Mail in 1928 and Daily Express in 1930. In the latter he became an editor. In 1930 he married Margaret Speers "Madge" Gribbin and they had two children together (Marilyn Butler and Richard Trevor Evans).

He remained with the Daily Express, joining their editorial team in London, and acting as their industrial correspondent. He attended industrial conferences, and was invited to stand for parliament, though he declined. He eventually became a director of Express Newspapers, and was appointed to the Press Council in 1964. He was appointed CBE in 1963 and knighted in 1967. Evans died suddenly on 10 June 1981.
