= Christina Colvin =

British literary scholar and historian

Christina Colvin, Lady Colvin (née Butler; 20 January 1919, Oxford – 7 August 2003, Oxford) was a British literary scholar and historian of Oxfordshire. She won the British Academy's Rose Mary Crawshay Prize in 1973.

== Life ==
Christina Edgeworth Butler was born in 1919 in Oxford, into a family of academic pedigree. Her father, H. E. Butler, was a Latinist; her aunts Ruth and Violet were fellows of St Anne's College, Oxford; and both her grandfathers were Oxford dons. She attended St Paul's Girls School and University College, London. She married Howard Colvin, an architectural historian, in 1943, and moved to Oxford when he took up a faculty position at St John's College.

From 1953, Colvin worked on several volumes of the Oxfordshire issues of the Victoria County History. She contributed to the topics of poor relief and religious nonconformity in volume 14, on the Bampton Hundred. She was a co-author of volumes 10–13.

Colvin also edited two volumes of the letters of Maria Edgeworth, who was her great-great-aunt. The papers, on loan from Dublin, were at the Bodleian Library, Oxford, and she worked with her sister-in-law Marilyn Butler in preparing them for publication. She won the Rose Mary Crawshay Prize in 1973 for Maria Edgeworth: Letters from England, 1813–1844, while Butler won for Maria Edgeworth: A Literary Biography. Edgeworth's descendants were known to have destroyed or amended several documents of Edgeworth's, but Colvin was able to restore them from later manuscripts.

== Selected works ==
- Maria Edgeworth: Letters from England, 1813–1844. Oxford University. 1971.
- Maria Edgeworth in France and Switzerland. Oxford: Clarendon. 1979.
