= Marilyn Butler =

British literary critic and academic (1937–2014)

Marilyn Speers Butler
- Born: Marilyn Speers Evans; 11 February 1937; Coombe, Kingston upon Thames, England
- Died: 11 March 2014 (aged 77); Oxford, England
- Occupation: Literary critic
- Notable work: Maria Edgeworth: A Literary Biography (1972)
- Spouse: Sir David Butler (m. 1962)
- Children: 3
- Father: Sir Trevor Evans
- Awards: Rose Mary Crawshay Prize

Marilyn Speers Butler, Lady Butler, FRSA, FRSL, FBA (née Evans; 11 February 1937 – 11 March 2014) was a British literary critic. She was King Edward VII Professor of English Literature at the University of Cambridge from 1986 to 1993, and Rector of Exeter College, Oxford, from 1993 to 2004. She was the first female head of a formerly all-male Oxford or Cambridge college. She won the British Academy's Rose Mary Crawshay Prize in 1973.

== Biography ==
Marilyn Speers Evans was born in Coombe, Kingston upon Thames, on 11 February 1937. Her father, Sir Trevor Maldwyn Evans was a journalist and her mother was Margaret Speers "Madge" Evans (née Gribbin). At the age of two, she was evacuated with her mother and elder brother to New Quay in Wales, where she remained until the end of World War II. She was educated at Wimbledon High School and St Hilda's College, Oxford, graduating with a first-class degree in English in 1958. She became a school teacher, but in 1960 joined the BBC as a journalist. On 3 March 1962, she married David Butler; the couple had three sons.

After she was diagnosed with Alzheimer's disease in 2004, Butler's health declined and she died at Headington Care Home, Oxford, on 11 March 2014 as a result of a respiratory tract infection.

== Career ==
In the early 1960s, Butler left journalism, and returned to academia, completing her doctoral thesis in 1966 in Oxford. She received a research fellowship at St Hilda's College, Oxford. Her published works include Romantics, Rebels and Reactionaries (1982) and Jane Austen and the War of Ideas (1975). Much of her work was devoted to the career of the Anglo-Irish Romantic novelist Maria Edgeworth, a relative of her husband, including a classic literary biography and an important edition of her collected works for Pickering & Chatto. Butler collaborated with her sister-in-law Christina Colvin on Maria Edgeworth, resulting in two books for which they each won the Rose Mary Crawshay Prize in 1973.

In June 2003, Butler was awarded an honorary degree from the Open University as Doctor of the University. She was a Fellow of the British Academy.

== Works ==
=== Books ===
- Maria Edgeworth: A Literary Biography (1972)
- Jane Austen and the War of Ideas (1975)
- Peacock Displayed: A Satirist in His Context (1979)
- Romantics, Rebels, and Reactionaries: English Literature and Its Background, 1760–1830 (1982)
- Mapping Mythologies: Countercurrents in Eighteenth-Century British Poetry and Cultural History (2015)

=== Edited books ===
- Frankenstein: 1818 text (Oxford World's Classics, 1994, rpt 1998, 2008)

Academic offices
Preceded by Richard Oswald Chandler Norman	Rector of Exeter College, Oxford; 1993-2004	Succeeded by Frances Cairncross
