= Nantgarw Colliery =

Welsh coal mine active 1910-1986

Coordinates: 51°33′46″N 3°16′38″W

Nantgarw Colliery after closure in 1986.

Nantgarw Colliery was a coal mine and later developed Coking coal works, located in the village on Nantgarw, Mid Glamorgan, Wales located just north of Cardiff.

Opened in 1910, it closed in 1986. The site is now redeveloped as the industrial estate Parc Nantgarw.

== Craig Yr Allt ==
Craig Yr Allt Colliery was situated south of Nantgarw village. However, whenever the River Taff flooded, water frequently entered its workings, and it was abandoned in 1878.

== Development ==
Thomas Taylor of Pontypridd began the development of Nantgarw colliery in May 1910, near the base of the Caerphilly Syncline seam. The sinking of the twin shafts in 1911 reached the coal seam at a depth of more than 850 yards (780 m) in 1915, placing them 2,000 feet (610 m) below sea level, making Nantgarw the deepest pit to be sunk in the South Wales Coalfield up to that time.

== Production ==
Connected to the Rhymney Railway via the Coryton Line, the mine was sold to the Taff Rhondda Navigation Steam Coal Co in 1924. The 850 men were redeployed in 1927 after geographical difficulties were encountered and the pit abandoned. Bought by Powell Duffryn Steam Coal Co Ltd, following further development attempts it was put into "care and maintenance."

Powell Duffryn designed a development scheme in 1937, but work was suspended when World War II broke out in 1939. A later project to re-open the colliery was approved by the Ministry of Fuel and Power in 1946, and after nationalisation in 1947, the National Coal Board invested £5 million on modern surface constructions and modern mining methods. The NCB designed a model colliery, with all old workings demolished and new surface buildings designed with state-of-the-art facilities, with appliances installed to reduce smoke and fumes. Coal production started in 1952, and by 1954, 200 men worked the surface and 820 men underground. New landings were made in both shafts at 280 yards and 380 yards, in order to work the mine by a system known as "Horizon Mining" employed in an effort to mine coal despite the site's geological problems. All the site's waste was dumped into the shafts to a level 60 ft below these new landings, placed underground to keep the surface clear of unsightly spoil heaps. The main heading was driven south, with the workings cutting through the No.1 Rhondda, Bute, Brass, and Hard seams due to the 36-degree dip to the north.

Industrial relations were rarely at Nantgarw, being part of the reasoning behind the 1927 closure, while in 1958 there were 65 stoppages, go-slows and walk-outs. Having survived the mass pit closures of the 1960s, the geographical problems meant the closure of the mine working in 1974, and the unit merged with Windsor Colliery, Abertridwr, Caerphilly from 1975. By 1979, the combined Nantgarw/Windsor Colliery employed around 650 men, producing over 4,000 tons of coal per week and making a profit of over £0.5 million.

== Coking ovens ==
The coke ovens and by-product plant were opened in 1951, as part of the NCB's modernisation of the regional and national coal industry. The plant produced both furnace and foundry coke for the steel industry. Both for the Welsh industry (then Ebbw Vale, Llanwern, and Port Talbot) and abroad, including Romania. Smokeless coal briquettes for the domestic market, branded Phurnacite, were stored at Nantgarw awaiting sale after being produced at the Phurnacite works at Abercwmboi in the Cynon Valley.

== Closure ==
The site of Nantgarw Colliery after demolition in August 1986

The whole coal production and coking works unit lost £7 million in 1981, employing: 142 on development; 131 on the coalface; 197 below the ground; 101 on the surface. In 1982 output declined steeply as a major coal seam at Windsor became unworkable, while in 1984 an overtime ban led directly to the 1984/5 UK miners strike spreading to South Wales. Although profitable post the strike, both sites of the whole unit closed as part of the NCB regional review on 6 November 1986.
