= Universal Colliery =

Coal mine in Senghenydd, Wales

Coordinates: 51°36′42″N 3°16′50″W

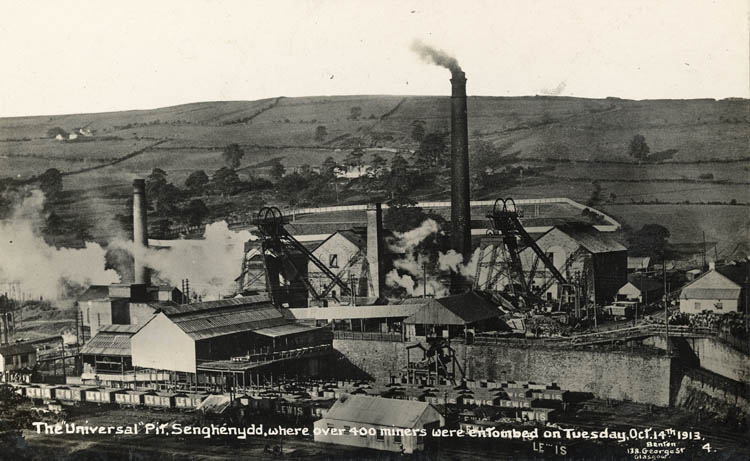
Universal Colliery in 1913

Universal Colliery was a coal mine located in Senghenydd in the Aber Valley, roughly four miles north-west of the town of Caerphilly. It was in the county borough of Caerphilly, traditionally in the county of Glamorgan, Wales.

Started in 1891, it became a ventilation facility for the Windsor Colliery in 1928 before complete closure in 1988.

== Background ==
Senghenydd, and neighbouring Abertridwr, in the Aber Valley became urbanised in the 1890s, when Universal (1891) and Windsor Collieries were sunk and the Rhymney Railway's Senghenydd extension branch opened in 1891.

The colliery was developed by William Thomas Lewis. As he pressed for the colliery to access deeper and thicker seams of steam coal, in 1901 an explosion at the colliery killed 81 men. The Mines Inspectorate were highly critical of Thomas-Lewis for not improving safety. In 1911, Thomas Lewis was created 1st Baron Merthyr. The Mines Inspectorate gave him an extended deadline of September 1913 to complete the safety plan implementation, but the deadline was missed.

Windsor Colliery was closed in November 1986.

== Notable accidents ==
Universal Colliery suffered the first of two major gas and coal dust explosions on 24 May 1901. Damage was sustained to both shafts, resulting in a restricted rescue attempt, and 81 of the 82 men working in the mine were killed.

On 14 October 1913 Senghenydd suffered the worst mining disaster and the single worst industrial accident in Britain's history, when a second gas explosion occurred, resulting in the loss of 439 lives. Many of the surviving miners went back to help their workmates who were either trapped or buried alive.
