= Sir Evan Williams, 1st Baronet =

Welsh industrialist (1871–1959)

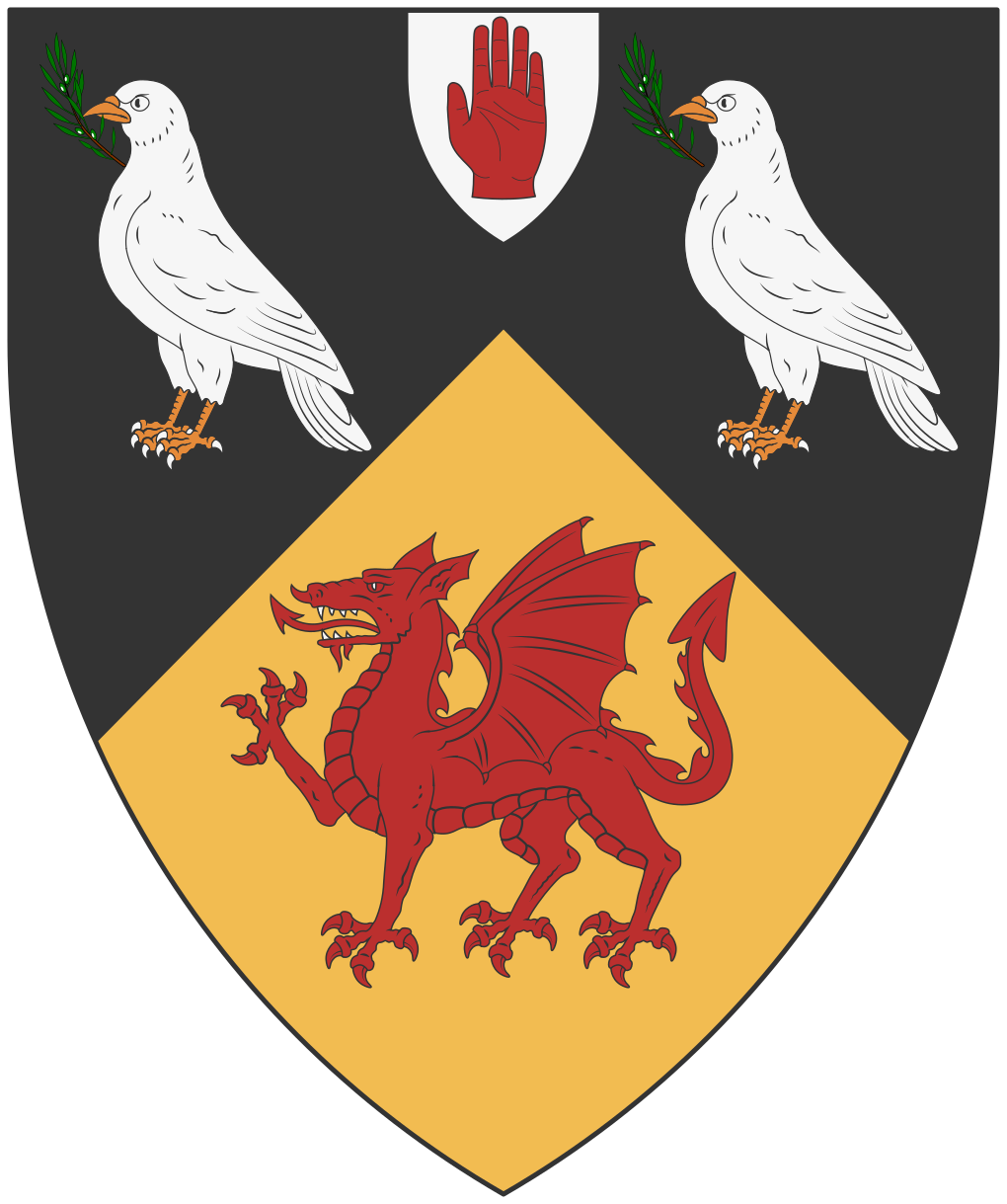
Arms of Williams of Glyndwr

Sir Evan Williams, 1st Baronet, of Glyndwr (2 July 1871 – 3 February 1959) was a Welsh industrialist. As Chairman of the Monmouthshire and South Wales Coalowners Association and later President of the Mining Association of Great Britain, he exerted considerable influence on the mining industry in the UK.

Williams was born at Pontarddulais, the son of mine-owner Thomas Williams, and was educated at Christ College, Brecon, and Clare College, Cambridge. Having taken over his father's business, Thomas Williams and Sons (Llangennech), Ltd, he became chairman of the Monmouthshire and South Wales Coalowners Association in 1913 and was a member of the Sankey Commission of 1919, which recommended public ownership of the coal industry. He was subsequently President of National Board for the Coal Industry, 1921–1925. Among other things, he was president of the Mining Association of Great Britain, President of National Confederation of Employers' Organisations, 1925–26; Chairman of the Central Council under Coal Mines Act (1930) to 1938; Chairman of the International Conference of European Coalowners' Organisations; Chairman of the Joint Standing Consultative Committee for the Coal Trade of Great Britain, 1936–1944; President of the British Colliery Owners' Research Association, Coal Utilisation Joint Council, and of the British Coal Utilisation Research Association.

On 10 July 1935, he was created 1st Baronet Williams of Glyndwr in the County of Carmarthen. Companies of which he was a director included the Steel Company of Wales Ltd and Lloyds Bank.

Baronetage of the United Kingdom
New creation	Baronet (of Glyndwr); 1935–1959	Extinct
