= Mining Association of Great Britain =

Mining industry association (1854-1954)

- Abbreviation: MAGB
- Formation: 1854; 172 years ago
- Dissolved: 23 September 1954; 72 years ago
- Type: Industry association
- Legal status: Defunct
- Region served: Great Britain
- Official language: English

The Mining Association of Great Britain (MAGB) was an industry association of employers in the mining industry of Great Britain that was active from 1854 to 1954.

== History ==
The Mining Association of Great Britain was established in 1854 to represent mining industry employers. Its purpose was to review proposed legislation that could affect the owners and take action if necessary. There was a central policy committee and various sub-committees. The MAGB participated in discussions over mine worker's wages, hours and employment conditions. It published a journal, ran schools and a mining college, and funded research into ways to prevent coal dust from causing explosions in the mines. The MAGB worked with the government's National Conciliation Board for the Coal Mining Industry and the Mineworkers' Federation of Great Britain.

Following World War I (1914–1918) there was discussion about the possibility of the mines being nationalized. Some of the owners were open to this if they could get sufficient compensation. Evan Williams, chairman of the Monmouthshire and South Wales Coal Owners' Association and soon to become virtually the life-president of the MAGB, told the MSWCOA that there would inevitably be some change in structure, and "there are certain owners who think it would be advisable to accept Nationalisation. There is, to an extent, an amount of justification for this, but it must be remembered that it is not in the Nation's interests, as well as the Owner's interests, that this should be resorted to."

The MAGB became largely irrelevant after the coal industry was nationalized in 1947. It was dissolved on 23 September 1954.

== Presidents ==
Presidents of the association included:

- Sir Frederick Jones, 1st Baronet
- W. E. Garforth (in 1908–09)
- Adam Nimmo (in 1918)
- Sir Evan Williams, 1st Baronet
- Andrew K. McCosh (1944–45)

== Sources ==
- Mining Association of Great Britain, The National Archives
- Supple, Barry (2 November 2006), "'No bloody revolutions but for obstinate reactions'? British coalowners in their context, 1919-20", in D. C. Coleman, Peter Mathias (ed.), Enterprise and History: Essays in Honour of Charles Wilson, Cambridge University Press, ISBN 978-0-521-03157-8
