= Monmouthshire and South Wales Coal Owners' Association =

Welsh mine owners' organisation (1873–1955)

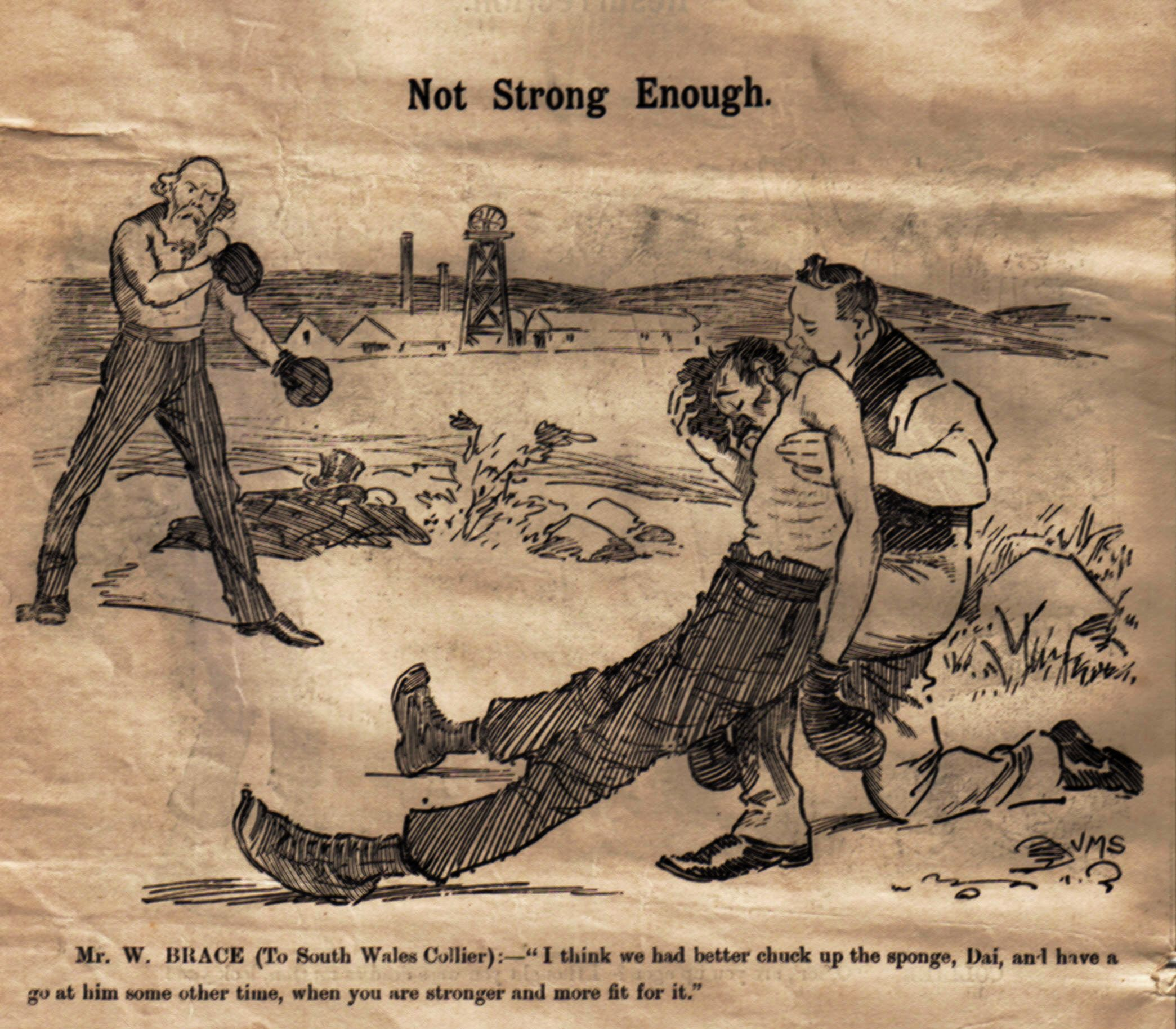
- Welsh coal strike of 1898, Western Mail. William Brace advises a miner to give up the fight against Sir William Lewis
- Abbreviation: MSWCOA
- Formation: 1873
- Dissolved: 1955
- Type: Industry association
- Legal status: Defunct
- Purpose: Represent mine owners
- Region served: South Wales Coalfield
- Official language: English
- Owner: South Wales coal mine owners
- Formerly called: 1873–90: Monmouthshire and South Wales Collieries Association

The Monmouthshire and South Wales Coal Owners' Association (MSWCOA) was an association of mine owners in South Wales that was active between 1873 and 1955. It fought wage increases, safety regulations, unionisation and other changes that would cut into profits. It managed to link miners wages, which were based on piece-work, to the price of coal. It was involved in various labour disputes, including a lengthy strike in 1926. The coal mines became unprofitable in the 1930s and were nationalised in 1947, making the association irrelevant.

== Organization ==
The Coal Owners Association has its origins in the Aberdare Steam Collieries Association, founded in 1864. In 1870 this association was restructured and renamed the South Wales Steam Collieries Association. It joined with the Iron Masters in 1873, taking the name of Monmouthshire and South Wales Collieries Association. (Note: The legal status of Monmouthshire was unclear until the Local Government Act 1972 took effect in 1974. The Laws in Wales Act 1542 (34 & 35 Hen. 8. c. 26) had listed the counties of Wales but excluded Monmouthshire, leaving the county's status ambiguous for over four centuries. This led to many organisations such as the South Wales and Monmouthshire School of Mines taking a long-winded and seemingly redundant form for their names.) In 1880 the association was restructured again. In 1890 it took its final name, the Monmouthshire and South Wales Coal Owners Association.

The executives of the Coal Owners Association included a chairman, vice-chairman, and secretary. Secretaries included Alexander Dalziel (1874–84), W. Gascoyne Dalziel (1884–1916), Finlay A. Gibson (1916–46) and Iestyn R. Williams (1947–50). Each of the three districts of Cardiff, Newport, and Swansea had a chairman and vice-chairman. There was a chairman of the Sliding-Scale committee, a chairman of the Finance committee and a solicitor. Other committees were the Conciliation Board, District Boards, Commercial Committee, Disputes Committee, and Coal Cutters and Conveyers Committee. At meetings of the association and district boards, each member in good standing had votes weighted depending on their mines' assured tonnage. Membership fees were also based on assured tonnage, so the larger owners paid more and had a greater say in decisions.

== Activities ==
The Coal Owners Association represented the owners of the mines so they could present a common front when dealing with the miners and could resist wage increases. It also represented the owners in court cases resulting from labour disputes and presented the owners' views on proposed legislation. The association was strongly opposed to safety legislation, working hours reductions and recognition of trade unions, and this resulted in a series of labour disputes. The members agreed to observe contracts made by the Association with workmen regarding their wages and employment conditions. They agreed not to hire workmen from another colliery during a strike at that colliery.

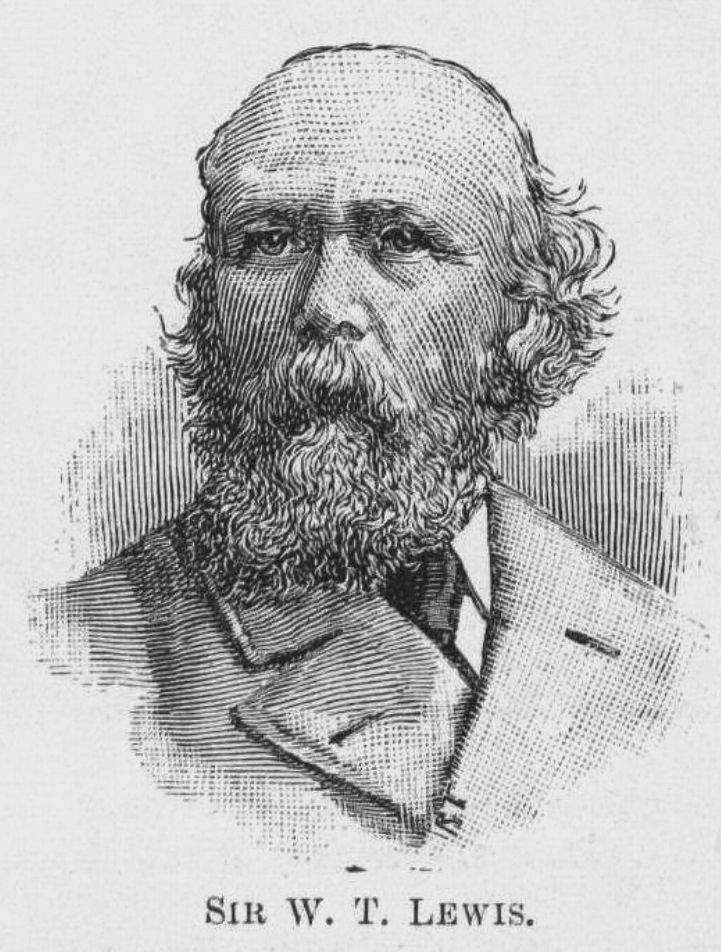
William Thomas Lewis, founding member and inventor of the sliding scale

The association defined the "Sliding Scale", an arrangement that regulated all coal mining wages based on the price of coal. Different sliding scales were defined in 1875, 1880, 1882, 1890 and 1892. The scale of 1 January 1892 was agreed by representatives of the Coal Owners Association and delegates representing the colliery workmen other than enginemen, stokers and outside fitters. The principle was that wages were based on the rates paid by the collieries under the December 1879 agreement, with a percentage increase or decrease based on the selling price of coal. This price was determined every two months as the average net selling price of coal delivered free on board at the docks of Cardiff, Newport, Swansea and Barry. The hewers received piece rates based on the net weight of coal extracted after eliminating small coal, paid every two weeks. The Sliding-Scale committee had to mediate constant disputes over wages between members. The Times of 29 December 1891 described the Association as follows,

The Association, which included sixty-seven of the most important coalowners and coalowning companies in July 1890, and possessed at that time a very large balance in cash, which has been increased to £100,000 at least, is practically a society for mutual assistance and indemnity against loss from strikes. Each member subscribes beforehand—and this is important—in proportion to his output, and the function of the Association is to regulate the action of members as to wages. ... if the men employed by a member ask for an increase in wages, the member asks the advice of the Association. If the Association tells him to yield, then yield he must ... if the Association tells him to resist, then he may resist in the full knowledge that he will be indemnified against loss of profits upon an agreed scale...

The Times went on to describe that the men were fully aware of the huge resources of the mine-owner, backed up by the Association, and also that if they worked at a colliery immediately before a strike they would not be employed by any of the Association members. The sliding scale was used to force both coalowners and workers to accept standard wages. If a worker refused, he would not find work in any of the Association's collieries.

== History ==
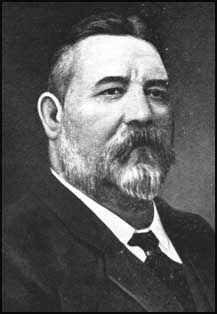
William Abraham, a workers' leader in the 1898 strike and first president of the South Wales Miners' Federation

=== Before World War I ===
The driving force behind the creation of the Association was William Thomas Lewis (1837–1914), one of the largest colliery owners, who also owned most of the Cardiff Docks and many other enterprises. Sidney Webb described him in the 1890s as "the best-hated man" among Welsh workers. Lewis was the architect of the sliding scale agreement, introduced in 1875. The arrangement was unstable. In 1892 concern was expressed that the sliding scale, which had raised the men's wages by 60%, might be terminated by December, affecting 80,000 men in 200 collieries. In August–September 1893 the South Wales coal workers went on strike over a 25% wage reduction caused by the sliding scale linked to a fall in the price of coal. The strike seemed to be collapsing by 31 August 1893, when it was estimated that 60,000 miners were working, more than half the total. That day the Emergency Committee of the Coal Owners' Association published a statement saying collieries producing half the assured output of the Association were at work.

With coal prices falling from the mid-1890s, D.A. Thomas campaigned for a cooperative organization that would treat the South Wales coalfield as a single enterprise and would regulate production and prices. Although owners who controlled 79.3% of output were willing to adopt Thomas's plan, as chairman of the Coal Owners Association Lewis ensured that it was rejected in 1896. The Welsh coal strike of 1898 began as an attempt by the colliers to remove the sliding scale. The strike quickly turned into a disastrous lockout which lasted for six months. In the end, the sliding scale stayed in place. After the strike, the South Wales Miners' Federation (SWMF) was founded in October 1898, with William Abraham (Mabon) as the first president. In 1889 the SWFM joined the newly formed Miners' Federation of Great Britain based in Newport, Wales.

In 1907 the association represented 80% of the output of the South Wales Coal Field, which then had 588 mines in operation and employed about 174,000 workmen.

The Coal Mines Regulation Act 1908 (8 Edw. 7. c. 57) limited working hours to eight hours, but since it excluding winding times the average bank-to-bank hours in the UK were in fact eight hours and thirty-nine minutes. (Note: The "bank" is the area at the top of the mine shaft. "Winding" is the process of lowering or raising the cage in the shaft. Miners would have to wait their turn before descending or coming back up, and this waiting period and the period in the cage did not count in the working day calculation.) The Coal Owners' Association published figures for many of the South Wales collieries that showed that bank-to-bank hours had been reduced from nine and a half to eight and a half hours. To partially offset the reduction, meal times had been cut by ten minutes. The Coal Mines Regulation Act 1908 allowed for an additional 60 hours to be worked annually over and above the eight hours daily, and the owners insisted on these hours being worked.

There was a strike in 1912 where the Coal Owners' Association wanted troops sent into the Rhondda valley to suppress the disturbances. Sir Charles Edward Troup (1857–1941) of the Home Office was reluctant to comply.

=== World War I ===
During World War I (1914–18) the Admiralty requisitioned coal throughout the war at the price that it chose. Coal for domestic use was regulated from July 1915 by the Price of Coal (Limitation) Act 1915 (5 & 6 Geo. 5. c. 75). During labour negotiations in 1916, the owners found themselves forced to retreat from selling prices as the key factor in setting wages towards one in which profit became the main consideration.

In May 1919 the former chairman of the association, Hugh Bramwell, told a Coal Industry Commission hearing:

It was early in 1916 that the [coal owners'] Mining Association decided that their relations with their workmen could not be the same after the war as they had been previously, and they appointed a committee to consider what was the best arrangement to make. That committee sat for several meetings and found that they had different opinions, and they appointed a sub-committee who did draw up a scheme both on the productive and on the distributive side. When that proposal came again before the Mining Association, the part on the distributive side was wiped out, and the part on the productive side was modified. They have been at it ever since, trying to arrive at some scheme that they could put forward, and their present proposals practically amount to a profit-sharing scheme as has been described.

The state took control of the South Wales coal industry in November 1916, halting discussion of profit sharing and joint consultation as ways to solve the industry problems, although these would re-emerge after the war.

=== After World War I ===
Clifford Cory (1859–1941), at one time chairman of the association

Following World War I (1914–18) there was a discussion about the possibility of the mines being nationalized. Some of the owners were open to this if they could get sufficient compensation. Evan Williams, chairman of the MSWCOA and soon to become president of the Mining Association of Great Britain (MAGB), told the MSWCOA that there would inevitably be some change in structure, and "there are certain owners who think it would be advisable to accept Nationalisation. There is, to an extent, an amount of justification for this, but it must be remembered that it is not in the Nation's interests, as well as the Owner's interests, that this should be reported to."

In 1921 there was a three-month lockout in the UK coal industry in response to wage reductions that were as high as 49% for labourers in South Wales. Hugh Clegg wrote in 1985, "The lockout ... became a fight to the finish, to be settled, if not by actual starvation, by the expenditure of all personal resources, the exhaustion of every source of credit, and the hunger of wives and children." The miners completely failed to obtain their objectives.

The South Wales miners were involved in the General Strike of 1926, and the miners did not accept the settlement in May 1926. However there were large stocks of coal in the country, and imports from the USA and Europe started arriving in July 1926. The strong community spirit in South Wales meant that miners there held out longer than elsewhere in the United Kingdom since it was "social suicide" to return to work. Miners began to trickle back to work in October, and in growing numbers in November, although until the strike ended there were no more than 38,000 miners working in South Wales out of a total of 250,000. On 19 November 1926 the Miners' Federation of Great Britain accepted defeat and allowed the opening of district negotiations. On 30 November 1926, the South Wales Miners' Federation executive council met the Coal Owners Association and agreed to order an immediate return to work.

By the mid-1920s it was clear that the coal industry was in long-term decline. In 1927 the Coal Owners Association accepted that wages could not be further lowered and other approaches must be tried such as production quotas to manage prices. 25% of the workforce was wholly or temporarily out of work by June 1928.

Until the mid-1930s the somewhat isolated anthracite mining district in rural West Glamorgan, Brecon and Carmarthen were not covered by the MSWCOA policies, but the pits in this region had many strikes. The owners here were criticized by other coalowners for failing to apply tougher policies such as reprisal, extended lay-offs, and prosecution of unofficial strikers.

=== Silicosis ===
Compensation for growing numbers of certified silicosis cases was causing severe financial problems at some coal companies by the late 1930s. In 1937 the MSWCOA set up a Coal Dust Research Committee to investigate dust-induced respiratory disease. The committee pioneered ways of sampling mine dust, but at the time there was no device capable of accurately sampling dust in the mines. The committee understood that the main cause of health problems was dust particles less than 5 microns in diameter, but thought silica dust was the main threat, rather than coal dust, and therefore argued that protection was only needed for men exposed to silica dust. The chairman of the MSWCOA stated,

... from the information supplied by experts, it is inevitable that there will be some extension of the regulations, and the owners must try and ensure these extensions are as small as possible. Silicosis affects South Wales more than any other district in the country, and medical examination might prove many men to be suffering from silicosis who were not previously aware of it. And resultant claims for compensation would be inevitable. It is not thought to be in the interest of the trade to apply a medical examination to men at present in the employ of the owners.

=== Last years ===
The MSWCOA became less relevant after the coal mines were nationalized in 1947 and placed under the National Coal Board. The association ceased activity in 1955. The records of the Coal Owners Association are now held by the National Library of Wales and provide a valuable source of information on the history of coal mining and industrial relations in the South Wales coalfields. Two volumes of surveys by Alexander Dalziel, an early secretary of the association, include reports and personal observations on many aspects of mining including underground workings, lamp lighting, ventilation, wages payment, colliery management, miners' housing and stable arrangements at pits.

== Sources ==
- Board of Trade (Labour Department) (1894), Wages and Hours of Labour ...: Report on Changes in Rates of Wages and Hours of Labour in the United Kingdom, H.M. Stationery Office
- Breverton, Terry (2013-02-28), The Welsh: The Biography, Amberley Publishing Limited, ISBN 978-1-4456-1572-1
- Bougen, P.D.; Ogden, S.G.; Outram, Q. (November 1988), "Profit Sharing and the Cycle of Control", Sociology, 22 (4), Sage Publications: 607–629, doi:10.1177/0038038588022004008, JSTOR 42854544, S2CID 145758926
- Brown, W.N. (1892), "The Industrial Question Abroad", The Mechanical News: An Illustrated Journal of Manufacturing, Engineering, Milling and Mining, James Leffel & Company
- Bruley, Sue (2010-03-01), The Women and Men of 1926: A Gender and Social History of the General Strike and Miners' Lockout in South Wales, University of Wales Press, ISBN 978-0-7083-2451-6
- Church, Roy; Outram, Quentin (2002-05-09), Strikes and Solidarity: Coalfield Conflict in Britain, 1889-1966, Cambridge University Press, ISBN 978-0-521-89403-6
- Clegg, H.A. (1985), A History of British Trade Unions since 1889, vol. II. 1911-1933, Oxford: Clarendon Press
- Davies, John; Jenkins, Nigel (2008), The Welsh Academy Encyclopaedia of Wales, Cardiff: University of Wales Press, ISBN 978-0-7083-1953-6
- Drage, Geoffrey (1892), Rules of Associations of Employers and of Employed: Together with Introductory Memoranda, Great Britain. Royal Commission on Labour. H.M. Stationery Office
- "Humble Address of the Monmouthshire and South Wales Coal Owners Association" (PDF), London Gazette, no. 28047, p. 5288, 2 August 1907
- Jeans, James Stephen (1894), Conciliation and Arbitration in a Labour Disputes: A Historical Sketch and Brief Statement of the Present Position of the Question at Home and Abroad, C. Lockwood and son
- Jones, Edgar (1990-11-25), A History of GKN: Volume 2: The Growth of a Business, 1918-1945, Palgrave Macmillan UK, ISBN 978-1-349-09664-0
- McIvor, Mr Arthur; Johnston, Mr Ronald (2013-06-28), Miners' Lung: A History of Dust Disease in British Coal Mining, Ashgate Publishing, Ltd., ISBN 978-1-4094-7961-1
- McKendrick, Neil; Outhwaite, R. B. (2002-06-06), Business Life and Public Policy: Essays in Honour of D. C. Coleman, Cambridge University Press, ISBN 978-0-521-52421-6
- Mitchell, B. R. (1984-08-23), Economic Development of the British Coal Industry 1800-1914, CUP Archive, ISBN 978-0-521-26501-0
- Pellew, Jill (1982), The Home Office, 1848-1914, from Clerks to Bureaucrats, Fairleigh Dickinson Univ Press, ISBN 978-0-8386-3165-2
- Rochester, Colin (2011), Understanding the Roots of Voluntary Action: Historical Perspectives on Current Social Policy, Sussex Academic Press, ISBN 978-1-84519-424-6
- Supple, Barry (2006-11-02), "'No bloody revolutions but for obstinate reactions'? British coalowners in their context, 1919-20", in D. C. Coleman, Peter Mathias (ed.), Enterprise and History: Essays in Honour of Charles Wilson, Cambridge University Press, ISBN 978-0-521-03157-8
- "The Crisis in the Coal Trade", The Journal of Gas Lighting, Water Supply & Sanitary Improvement, Walter King, 1893
- Troughton, Lorena (23 January 2012), Coal Owners of South Wales, National Library of Wales
- Troughton, Lorena (2013), Monmouthshire and South Wales Coal Owners Association Records, National Library of Wales
