= Senghenydd =

Coordinates: 51.6082°N 3.2770°W

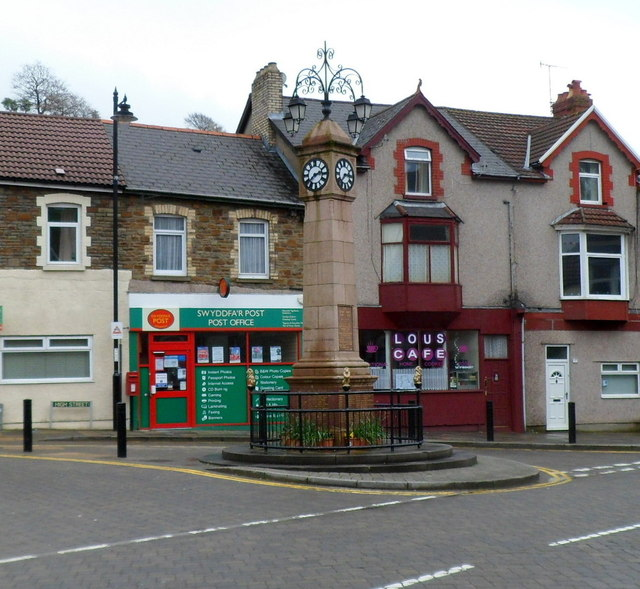
- The Grade II listed war memorial

- Location within Caerphilly
- OS grid reference: ST117907
- Principal area: Caerphilly
- Preserved county: Gwent
- Country: Wales
- Sovereign state: United Kingdom
- Post town: CAERPHILLY
- Postcode district: CF83
- Dialling code: 029
- Police: Gwent
- Fire: South Wales
- Ambulance: Welsh
- UK Parliament: Caerphilly

Senghenydd (sometimes Welsh: Senghennydd, IPA: [sɛŋˈhɛnɪð]) is a former mining village in the community of Aber Valley in South Wales, approximately four miles northwest of the town of Caerphilly. Historically within the county of Glamorgan, it is now situated in the county borough of Caerphilly. In the United Kingdom Census 2001, the population of the Aber Valley (which also includes the neighbouring village of Abertridwr) was 6,696.

== Toponym ==
The name derives originally from the name Sangan + suffix ydd, probably meaning "the land or territory associated with Sangan". The suffix 'ydd' is often used in Welsh, following a personal name, to denote ownership, as in 'Meirionnydd' or 'Eifionydd'.

Historically the name has appeared in a number of different forms, including: 'Seinhenit' (c. 1179), 'Seighenith' (c. 1194), 'Seynghenyth' (1271), 'Senghenyth' (1314), 'Seynthenneth' (1476), 'Seignhenith Suptus et Supra Cayach' (1578–84).

Alternatively, the name may be a spelling variant, from 1326, of 'Seint Genith', from Saint Cenydd. The local church and school have taken this name, as has the nearby 20th-century settlement of Trecenydd. According to tradition, St Cennydd built a monastery near the village; although there is no evidence It is also claimed that the area Senghennydd was named after him. The son of Cennydd, St Ffili, is said to have built a fort in the area, making the name of Caerphilly (Ffili's Fort in the Welsh language).

== History ==
Senghenydd was originally a rural farming community, which became industrialised with the discovery of coal in the late 19th century. With the closure of the coal pits in the second half of the twentieth century, most people in the village now commute outside the Aber Valley for employment.

== Early history ==
The settlement was also a stronghold for the Welsh during the late 11th century. By the 13th century, it remained in Welsh hands and the Welsh chieftain Ifor Bach (hence the name of the local Welsh school in the village). Ifor Bach's great grandson Llewelyn Bren (Llewelyn ap Gruffudd ap Rhys) was the last Welsh lord of Senghenydd, but lost control of his lands after the six-week siege of Caerphilly Castle and a brief battle at Castell Morgraig, a Welsh-built castle at Cefn-Onn ("Ash Ridge") which was possibly built by the Lords of Senghenydd.

It is also reputed that Ifor Bach built a medieval castle on the site that is now occupied by Castell Coch.

Llewelyn Bren was later sent as a prisoner first to Brecon and then to the Tower of London along with his family

In 1318 Llywelyn became the prisoner of the ruthless Hugh Despenser the younger, one of King Edward's favourites at court, who had become Lord of Glamorgan in November 1317 and thus the largest land owner in South Wales, and was a great rival of Mortimer. Without the king's direction, he took Llywelyn Bren to Cardiff Castle where he had him hanged, drawn and quartered without a proper trial. After the parts of his body were exhibited in various parts of the county he was buried in the Grey Friars at Cardiff. Llywelyn's lands were seized by Despenser. This action was condemned at the time and later used as example of the Despensers' growing tyranny. Despenser also imprisoned Lleucu and some of her sons in Cardiff.

In October 1326, after the successful rebellion led by Roger Mortimer, the Despensers and Edward had further cause to regret their actions in Glamorgan after they were forced to flee there. Edward and the Despensers' attempts to raise troops locally were (understandably) a dismal failure. This led to their capture in November; then Hugh endured the same death he inflicted on Llewelyn when he too was hanged, drawn and quartered.

With the overthrow of Edward II, the estates in Senghenydd were restored (11 February 1327) to Llywelyn Bren's sons: Gruffydd, John, Meurig, Roger, William and Llywelyn. The Earls of Hereford continued to pay at Brecon an allowance to their mother Lleucu until 12 April 1349.

== Coal mining ==
Senghenydd, along with its neighbouring village Abertridwr, make up the majority of the Aber Valley in the South Wales Coalfield, which became urbanised in the 1890s, when the Universal and Windsor collieries were sunk in this region.

The Universal Colliery at Senghenydd suffered the first of two major gas and coal dust explosions on 24 May 1901. Damage was sustained to both shafts, resulting in a restricted rescue attempt, and 81 of the 82 men working in the mine were killed.

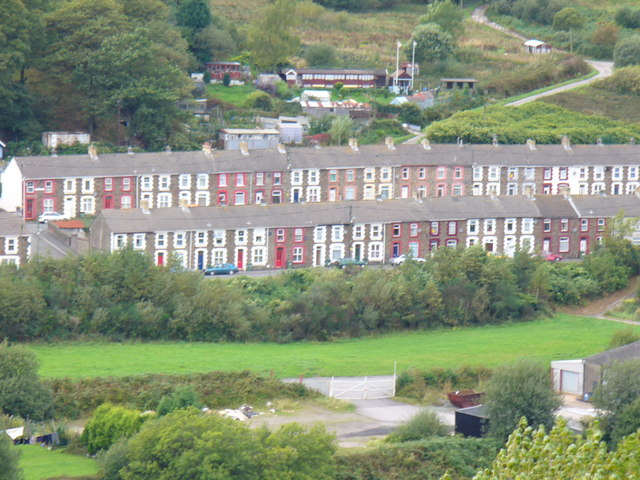
Miners' Rows, Senghenydd

On 14 October 1913, Senghenydd suffered the worst mining disaster in Britain's history, when a second gas explosion occurred at the Universal Colliery, resulting in the loss of 439 lives, and the death of one rescuer. Many of the surviving miners went back to help their workmates who were either trapped or buried alive.

Universal Colliery was finally closed on Friday 30 March 1928 (except for a ventilation shaft) with the loss of 2,500 jobs.

In 2013, the Welsh National and Universal Mining Disaster Memorial Garden was opened in Senghenydd, dedicated to all those who died in mining disasters throughout Wales. In March 2024, it was added to the Cadw/ICOMOS Register of Parks and Gardens of Special Historic Interest in Wales.

== Health research ==
Men from Senghenydd participate in one of the world's longest running epidemiology studies – The Caerphilly Heart Disease Study. Since 1979, a representative sample of adult males born between 1918 and 1938, living in Caerphilly and the surrounding villages of Abertridwr, Bedwas, Machen, Senghenydd and Trethomas, have participated in the study. A wide range of health and lifestyle data have been collected throughout the study and have been the basis of over 400 publications in the medical press. A notable report was on the reductions in vascular disease, diabetes, cognitive impairment and dementia attributable to a healthy lifestyle.

== Transport ==
Senghenydd is served by the B4263 road to Caerphilly, and connects to Nelson via roads over Mynydd Eglwysilan to the north.

== Sport ==
Senghenydd Rugby Football Club is a rugby union club affiliated to the Welsh Rugby Union who have played in the village since 1898.

== Notable people ==
- Ifor Bach (fl. c. 1158), nobleman and progenitor of the minor Welsh royal house of Senghenydd.
- Clifford George Evans, professional actor best known for his work with Hammer Studios.
- Martin Thomas, professional footballer, most notably with Newcastle United.
- Major (Retired) Gillian Jones, Army Officer & Permanent Secretary to the Secretary of State for Wales.
- Major Huw Jones, Army officer and academic.
