= Aber Valley =

Aber Valley: Welsh: Cwm Aber
- Location within Caerphilly
- Population: 6,799 (2011)
- OS grid reference: ST1156390715
- Principal area: Caerphilly
- Preserved county: Mid Glamorgan
- Country: Wales
- Sovereign state: United Kingdom
- Post town: Caerphilly
- Postcode district: CF83
- Dialling code: 029
- Police: Gwent
- Fire: South Wales
- Ambulance: Welsh
- List of places UK Wales Caerphilly 51°36′17″N 3°16′25″W Map of the community

Aber Valley is a valley community in Caerphilly county borough, South Wales. It has two main communities, Abertridwr and Senghenydd, which grew around the mining industry in the late 19th and early 20th centuries. Senghenydd has a longer history than Abertridwr; it was once a cantref (or "hundred") encompassing quite a large area.

The Aber Valley Heritage Group has established a Heritage Museum situated within Senghenydd Community Centre in order to commemorate the scene of the largest mining disaster in British history: the 1913 Senghenydd Colliery Disaster when 439 miners died.

The Aber Valley Male Voice Choir was created in 1959. The choir has toured round the world, appeared at many Eisteddfods, and performed at the opening match of the 2015 Rugby World Cup at the Millennium Stadium.
