= Abertridwr, Caerphilly =

Village in Wales

Coordinates: 51°35′47″N 3°16′05″W

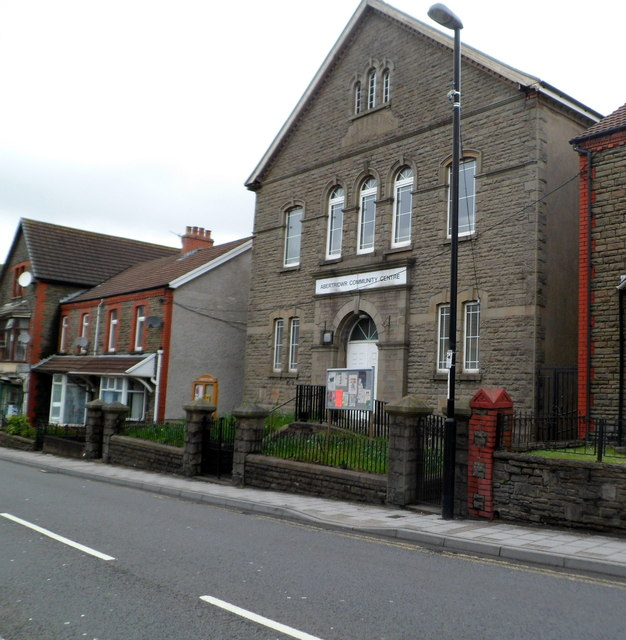
Abertridwr Community Centre

Abertridwr (Welsh pronunciation; Welsh: the mouth of the three waters) is a village in Caerphilly County Borough, Wales, situated about 3 miles (4.8 km) north-west of Caerphilly town. The "three waters" or "three streams" are Nant Cwm-parc, Nant Cwmceffyl and Nant Ilan, which join to form Nant yr Aber.

Like many villages and towns in the area, Abertridwr was a coal mining community within the South Wales Coalfield.

== Windsor Colliery ==
The Windsor Colliery was located in Abertridwr. In 1895, the Windsor Colliery Company started to sink two mine shafts to a depth of around 2,018 feet (615 m). The first coal was raised in 1902. The workings were connected underground to the Universal Colliery in Senghenydd for ventilation purposes.

On 1 June 1902, a platform collapsed in the mine, tipping nine men into 25 feet (8 m) of water, which had gathered in the sump. Three escaped drowning by clinging onto floating debris, but the other six died.

The colliery was nationalised and was run by the National Coal Board from 1946. During 1976, it became linked underground with the Nantgarw Colliery, and both mines were worked as one unit, with coal winding (i.e. raising to the surface) and processing via Nantgarw. From 1976, production was concentrated at Nantgarw, with Windsor kept open for ventilation, methane extraction, and as an emergency exit.

The whole Nantgarw/Windsor unit closed on 6 November 1986. Tyn y Parc (Welsh: house in the park) housing estate now occupies the site.

== Health research ==
Men from Abertridwr participate in one of the world's longest running epidemiology studies, the Caerphilly Heart Disease Study. Since 1979, a representative sample of adult males born between 1918 and 1938, living in Caerphilly and the surrounding villages of Abertridwr, Bedwas, Machen, Senghenydd and Trethomas, have participated in the study. A wide range of health and lifestyle data have been collected throughout the study and have been the basis of over 400 publications in the medical press. A notable report was on the reductions in vascular disease, diabetes, cognitive impairment and dementia attributable to a healthy lifestyle.

== Famous residents ==
- Sir Trevor Evans (1902–1981), journalist, was born in Abertridwr.
- From 1913 until his death, Abertridwr was the home of John Roberts ('Jack Russia') (1899–1979), miner, local councillor, prominent member of the Welsh Communist Party and volunteer with the International Brigade in the Spanish Civil War.
- The village was the birthplace of artist Peter Prendergast (1946–2007).
- Abertridwr was the birthplace of Geraint Watkins (born 1951), rock and roll pianist and accordionist for musicians including Nick Lowe, Dave Edmunds, Van Morrison, Mark Knopfler, Shakin' Stevens and Status Quo.
