= Geology of Merseyside =

Geology of English county

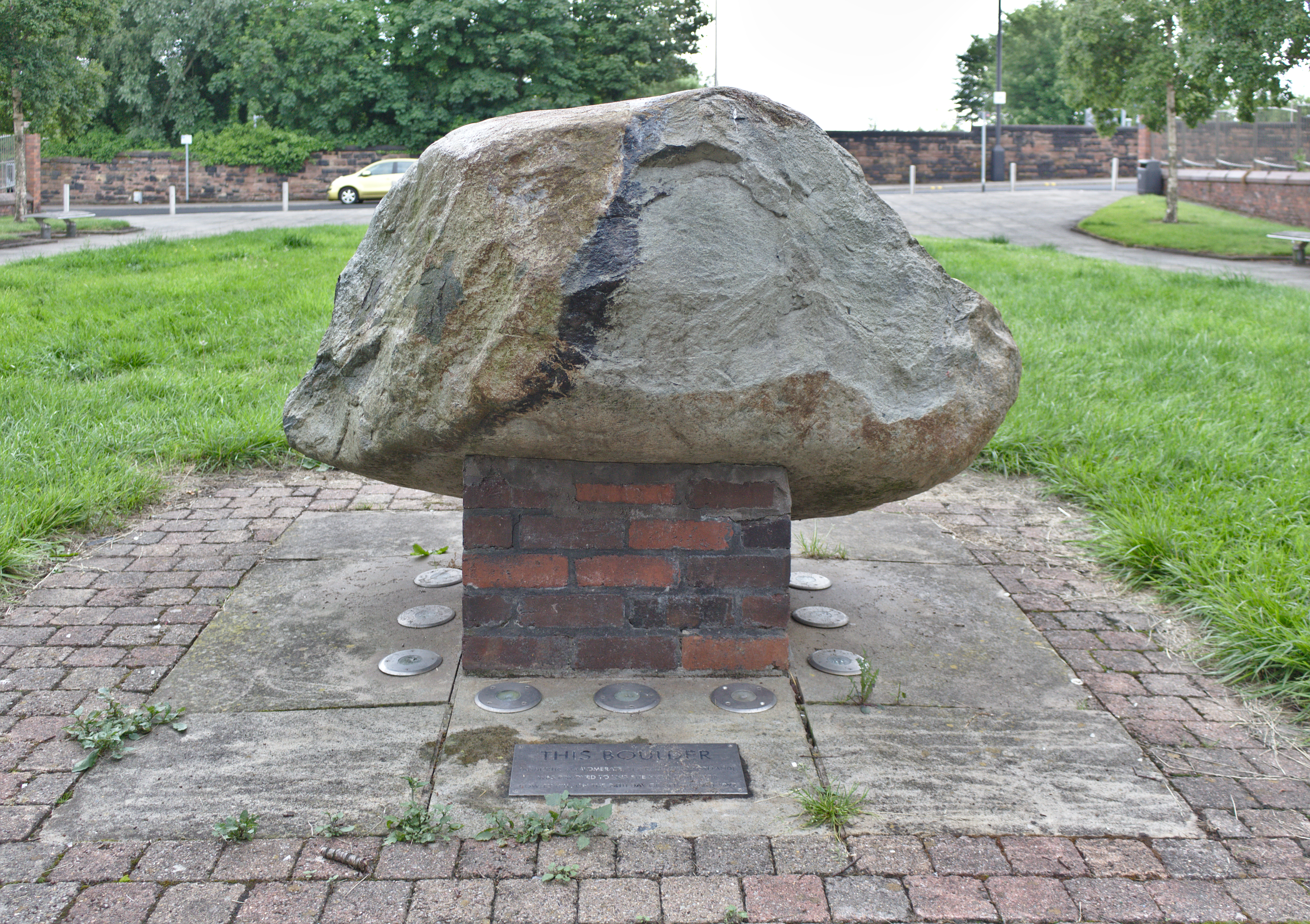
Andesitic agglomerate glacial erratic from Yewdale, Westmorland, and mounted on a brick plinth in the Friends' Garden, St Helens.

This article describes the geology of the ceremonial county of Merseyside which includes the City of Liverpool and the modern metropolitan boroughs of Knowsley, Sefton and St Helens which prior to 1974 were part of the historic county of Lancashire and the Metropolitan Borough of Wirral which was until then part of the historic county of Cheshire.

The geology of Merseyside in northwest England largely consists of a faulted sequence of Carboniferous Coal Measures rocks overlain in the west by younger Triassic and Permian age sandstones and mudstones. Glaciation during the present Quaternary Period has left widespread glacial till as well as erosional landforms. Other post-glacial superficial deposits such as river and estuarine alluvium, peat and blown sand are abundant.

== Carboniferous ==
Carboniferous rocks underlie all of Merseyside but are only exposed to the east of the north-south Boundary Fault. The sequence encountered locally comprises (in descending order, youngest at top):

- Warwickshire Group (formerly the 'Barren' or 'Red Measures')
- Pennine Coal Measures Group (sometimes formerly the 'Productive' or 'Grey Coal Measures')
  - Pennine Middle Coal Measures Formation
  - Pennine Lower Coal Measures Formation
- Millstone Grit Group

The oldest rocks to appear at or near the surface within the county are from the Namurian Epoch. These are alternate units of sandstone ('flags' and 'grits') and mudstone with occasional coal seams (known locally as 'mines') forming a part of the Millstone Grit Group. They are brought to the surface on the eastern side of the Upholland Fault and dip eastwards beneath Billinge Hill. The full Namurian sequence hereabouts is:

- Gastrioceras subcrenatum marine band
  - mudstone
- Six Inch Mine (coal seam)
  - mudstone
- Sand Rock Mine (coal seam)
  - mudstone
- Rough Rock
  - mudstone
- Upper Haslingden Flags
  - mudstone
- Lower Haslingden Flags
  - mudstone
- Holcombe Brook Mine (coal seam)
  - mudstone
- Holcombe Brook Grit
  - mudstone
- Brooksbottom Grit
  - mudstone

Overlying the Millstone Grit sequence is the thick Westphalian sequence of sandstones, mudstones and coal seams collectively referred to as the Pennine Coal Measures Group and which forms the Lancashire Coalfield, the western part of which extends into Merseyside. The youngest Carboniferous strata in the area are the non-productive (of coal) reddened beds of the Warwickshire Group.

== Permian ==
The rocks of the Manchester Marls and Collyhurst Sandstone formations, which are ascribed to the Middle Permian Appleby and ?Upper Permian Cumbrian Coast groups respectively, have been detected at depth through exploratory boring but are not exposed at the surface.

== Triassic ==
A pile up to several hundred metres thick of Triassic sandstones, mudstones and siltstones underlies Wirral, Liverpool and the coastal plains to the north. The following sequence is encountered within Merseyside:

- Mercia Mudstone Group
  - Sidmouth Mudstone Formation (formerly 'Keuper Marl')
  - Tarporley Siltstone Formation (formerly 'Keuper Waterstones')
- Sherwood Sandstone Group
  - Helsby Sandstone Formation (formerly 'Keuper Sandstone')
    - Frodsham Member
    - Delamere Member
  - Wilmslow Sandstone Formation (formerly 'Upper Mottled Sandstone')
    - Thurstaston Sandstone Member
  - Chester Pebble Beds Formation (formerly 'Pebble Beds')
  - Kinnerton Sandstone Formation (formerly 'Lower Mottled Sandstone')

The Mercia Mudstone Group together with the Helsby Sandstone Formation are ascribed to the Middle Triassic (Anisian) whilst the lower part of the sequence shown above is ascribed to the Early Triassic.

The relatively hard-wearing Helsby Sandstone forms many of the more prominent hills in the area such as Irby Hill, Storeton Hill and Bidston Hill on Wirral and also the tidal island of Hilbre Island in the Dee Estuary. Quarries opened up in the Chester Pebble Beds and Helsby Sandstone formations have provided building stones as used in Liverpool Anglican Cathedral and Lime Street station for example. The quarry at Storeton Hill has been active since Roman times; some of this rock was used more recently as cladding for the Empire State Building in New York. The quarry has also yielded fossils such as the footprints of the Triassic reptilian Chirotherium.

The Thurstaston Sandstone Member of the Wilmslow Sandstone Formation outcrops at Caldy Hill, Thurstaston Hill and nearby Heswall Dales.

== Structure ==
The sequence of both Carboniferous and Triassic rocks is criss-crossed by geological faults generally oriented north–south of NNW-SSE. The most significant is the north–south oriented Boundary Fault which runs west of Widnes, St Helens and Skelmersdale and marks the western edge of the Carboniferous Coal Measures outcrop. A local high in the Palaeozoic basement running WSW-ENE through Merseyside separates the East Irish Sea Basin from the Cheshire Basin to the southeast.

The Triassic rocks of Wirral are affected by the Caldy, Grange, Thurstaston, Frankby, Greasby, Woodchurch, Seacombe, Barnston and Neston faults.

From Eccleston southwards, the roughly north–south aligned Eccleston West and Eccleston East faults define a graben in which Triassic rocks are exposed at the surface whereas to east and west are Coal Measures. Elsewhere in the St Helens area, the coalfield is broken by the generally NNW-SSE aligned Roaring Meg, Derbyshire Hill and Twenty Acre faults.

== Quaternary ==
=== Glacial legacy ===
During the last ice age the area was over-ridden by the Irish Sea ice sheet moving south and southeastwards resulting in the development of iceways such as the channel now occupied by the Mersey between Liverpool and Wirral. Glacial meltwater cut tunnel valleys through the bedrock, the majority of which were subsequently filled by later deposits. Glacial till is smeared across much of the area. After the ice sheets had melted away from the Irish Sea but before vegetation had taken hold and before the sea reflooded that basin, blowing sand drifted across Merseyside to form what is now known as the Shirdley Hill Sand, a sheetlike deposit up to 2.5m thick in places. The presence of this sand was responsible for the establishment of the glassmaking industry in St Helens though the raw materials are now sourced in Cheshire.

=== Post-glacial sediments ===
Subsequently, coastal and estuarine sands, silts and muds have been deposited widely throughout the Mersey and Dee estuaries whilst alluvium fills the floor of other river and stream valleys. Considerable areas of recent blown sand cover the coastal zone around Southport and southwards to Formby and peat has developed across lower ground as at Holland Moss and Sefton Meadows inland of Southport and Formby.

== See also ==
- Geology of the United Kingdom
- Geology of England
