= Coal Measures Group =

The Coal Measures Group is a lithostratigraphical term coined to refer to the coal-bearing succession of rock strata which occur in the United Kingdom within the Westphalian Stage of the Carboniferous Period. The succession was previously referred to as the 'Productive Coal Measures'. Other than in Northern Ireland the term is now obsolete in formal use and is replaced by the Pennine Coal Measures Group, Scottish Coal Measures Group and the South Wales Coal Measures Group for the three distinct depositional provinces of the British mainland.

== Pennine Coal Measures Group ==
Within the Pennine Basin the Pennine Coal Measures Group is preceded (underlain) by the Millstone Grit Group which is of Namurian age. It is succeeded (overlain) by the Warwickshire Group which comprises a largely non-productive sequence of red beds. It comprises the:

- Pennine Upper Coal Measures Formation
- Pennine Middle Coal Measures Formation
- Pennine Lower Coal Measures Formation

The 'Pennine Basin' includes all of the coalfields of northern England and the English Midlands together with the Canonbie Coalfield of southern Scotland and the coalfields of northeast Wales and Anglesey.

== Scottish Coal Measures Group ==
A similar scheme operates in the Midland Valley Basin of Scotland. These formations lie above the Namurian-age Clackmannan Group and below an unconformity.

- Scottish Upper Coal Measures Formation
- Scottish Middle Coal Measures Formation
- Scottish Lower Coal Measures Formation

== South Wales Coal Measures Group ==
In those coalfields to the south of the former Wales-Brabant High i.e. the South Wales, Bristol, Somerset, Forest of Dean and concealed Oxfordshire and Kent coalfields, the corresponding group is the South Wales Coal Measures Group. It comprises the:

- South Wales Upper Coal Measures Formation
- South Wales Middle Coal Measures Formation
- South Wales Lower Coal Measures Formation

In South Wales, the larger part of what had been the Upper Coal Measures now forms the Pennant Sandstone Formation in the overlying Warwickshire Group. The South Wales Coal Measures Group is preceded (underlain) by the Marros Group.

== See also ==
- Coal measures
