= Pennine Coal Measures Group =

Coal-bearing rock strata in the United Kingdom

- Stratigraphic range: Langsettian (Westphalian A) – Bolsovian (Westphalian C)
- Type: Group
- Unit of: Coal Measures Supergroup
- Underlies: Warwickshire Group etc
- Overlies: Millstone Grit Group
- Thickness: up to 1600m

Lithology
- Primary: mudstone, sandstone
- Other: siltstone, coal, seatearth

Location
- Region: northern England, English Midlands, north Wales
- Extent: across northern England, English Midlands, north Wales

Type section
- Named for: Pennine Hills

The Pennine Coal Measures Group is a lithostratigraphical term referring to the coal-bearing succession of rock strata which occur in the United Kingdom within the Westphalian Stage of the Carboniferous Period. In formal use, the term replaces the Coal Measures Group as applied to the succession of coal-bearing strata within the Pennine Basin which includes all of the coalfields of northern England and the English Midlands. It includes the largely concealed Canonbie Coalfield of southern Scotland and the coalfields of northeast Wales and the minor Anglesey coalfield.

The sequence mainly consists of mudstones and siltstones together with numerous sandstones, the more significant ones of which are individually named. Some are laterally extensive, others are more restricted in their range. There are numerous coal seams, again with some being more laterally continuous than others. Those which were economically valuable were named though any individual seam may have attracted different names in different pits and different districts. Marine bands preserving distinctive and dateable marine fossils such as goniatite cephalopods and brachiopods are widespread within the sequence and enable correlation to be made between sequences in one part of the basin and another and with other basins.

== Stratigraphy ==
The term Productive Coal Measures was formerly used for this succession. The Group comprises the:

- Pennine Upper Coal Measures Formation
- Pennine Middle Coal Measures Formation
- Pennine Lower Coal Measures Formation

The Pennine Coal Measures Group is preceded (underlain) by the Millstone Grit Group which is of Namurian age. It is succeeded (overlain) by the Warwickshire Group which comprises a largely non-productive sequence of red beds.

Descriptions of the coal seams are found within (or linked from) articles on the individual coalfields. Many of the sandstones give rise to distinct features in the landscape as they are more resistant to weathering and erosion than the intervening shales. Some have been quarried for building material, including flagstones for paving. East of the Pennines, the following main sandstone beds are recorded (note that not all will be present in any one district; multiple entries on one line are of broadly the same age):

- Badsworth Rock
- Houghton Common Rock / Ravenfield Rock
- Brierley Rock / Wickersley Rock
- Newstead (Pontefract) Rock
- 'Extra' Rock
- Ackworth Rock
- Mexborough Rock
- Glass Houghton Rock
- Ackton Rock
- Oaks Rock
- Woolley Edge Rock
- Horbury Rock
- Thornhill Rock
- Birstall Rock
- Deep Hard Rock
- Parkgate Rock
- Silkstone Rock
- Penistone Flags
- Grenoside Sandstone
- Wingfield Flags
- Greenmoor Rock
- Elland Flags
- 80 Yard Rock / Wharncliffe Rock
- Stanningley Rock / Loxley Edge Rock
- Crawshaw Sandstone / Soft Bed Flags

To the west of the Pennines, the following are recorded:

- Worsley Delf Rock
- Newton Heath Sandstone / Prestwich Rock
- Nob End Rock
- Peel Hall Rock / Bardsley Rock
- Pemberton Rock / Huncliffe Rock
- Ravenhead Rock
- Chamber Rock
- Blenfire Rock
- Trencherbone Rock
- Cannel Rock
- Tim Bobbin Rock
- China Mine Rock
- Dandy Rock
- Old Lawrence Rock
- Dyneley Knoll Flags
- Crutchman Sandstone / Milnrow Sandstone / 80 Yard Rock
- Darwen Flags
- Helpet Edge Rock
- Inch Rock
- Great Arc Sandstone (Bullion Rock)
- Harrock Hill Grit
- Woodhead Hill Rock / Soft Bed Flags
