= Mynydd Llangynidr =

Hill (557.6m) in Powys, Wales

Coordinates: 51°49′N 3°19′W

Mynydd Llangynidr is a mountain in the Brecon Beacons National Park largely in the county of Powys, south Wales. Its southern slopes extend into the northernmost parts of the county borough of Blaenau Gwent. It is named from the village of Llangynidr which sits in the valley of the River Usk to the north of it. It is essentially an undulating plateau rising in the west to a height of 557m at Garn Fawr at OS grid ref SO 123151. A secondary high point is achieved at a point marked by a trig point at SO 147159. To the north the hill overlooks the valleys of Dyffryn Crawnon and Cwm Claisfer, themselves tributary valleys of the Usk. The shallow upper valley (Cwm Carneilw) of the Ebbw River reaches into the plateau in the southeast whilst the upper reaches of the Sirhowy Valley and its tributary the Nant Trefil define its western margins. A further tributary, the Nant Milgatw, reaches in from the south whilst the sharp edge of Rassau Industrial Estate also defines a part of its southern margin. Passing east across the B4560, the hill merges with Mynydd Llangatwg which has a similar character.

== Geology ==
Mynydd Llangynidr is formed from a layer cake of Palaeozoic Era sandstones and limestones which dip gently southwards into the South Wales Coalfield basin. Broken cliffs of Carboniferous Limestone occur along the northern edges and this rock underlies the entire mountain. The plateau is formed from coarse sandstones ('gritstones') also dating from the Carboniferous Period and which have foundered in many places as the underlying limestone has dissolved over millennia. The larger part of the mountain has a pock-marked appearance due to the hundreds of shakeholes in its surface arising from the presence of the limestone beneath the sandstone cover. The frequently conglomeratic sandstones of the central and northern parts of the hill are the Twrch Sandstone, also often still referred to by its earlier name, the Basal Grit. The less frequently exposed sandstone of the southern part is the lowermost Westphalian age Farewell Rock which forms the base of the Coal Measures.

=== Caves ===
The most celebrated cave on Mynydd Llangynidr is Ogof Fawr or Chartist Cave (or sometimes 'Chartists Cave'), so named as it was reputed to be a hiding place for the Chartists of South Wales, situated 500m to the east of the top of Garn Fawr. The Carno Adit is a major horizontal tunnel driven beneath the mountain from the south. It intersects a cave system and has provided useful additional information about the area's geological make-up. Other caves include Ogof Cynnes ('warm cave') whose small entrance lies in an elongated shakehole at SN 140154 and Crescent Cave not far from Chartist Cave at SN 129151.

=== Conservation designation ===
The area was proposed for designation as a site of special scientific interest by the Countryside Council for Wales in August 2012 in respect of its karstic geomorphology. The SSSI citation makes reference to the doline field, describing the site as a part of 'the best British example of an interstratal karst'. The SSSI extends to 896.8 hectares. The designation process was completed in February 2013.

== Quarrying ==
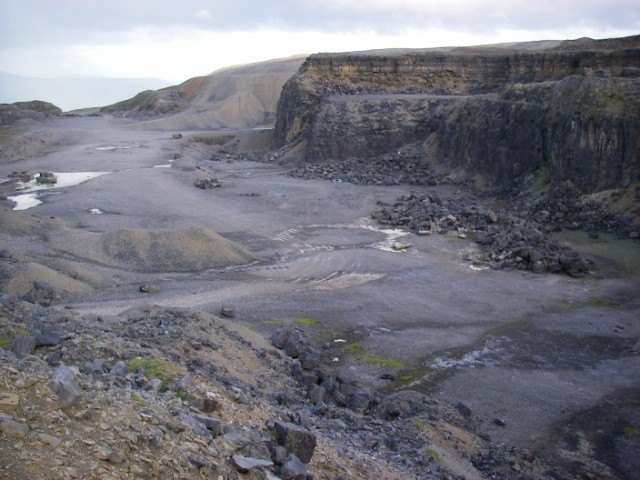
Blaen Onneu limestone quarry

A couple of major limestone quarries intrude upon the mountain. There is an active quarry at Trefil whilst that at Blaen Onneu in the northeast has not been worked since the 1980s. There are also a few small quarries for limestone which predate the larger workings. Some small scale mining of ironstone was also carried out near the head of Cwm Carneilw before the middle of the nineteenth century. There are a handful of small abandoned workings for sandstone in the Farewell Rock outcrop on the hill's eastern margin in the vicinity of the Beaufort Road.

== Water catchment ==
Three reservoirs sit towards the southern edge of the moor. Llangynidr Reservoir was constructed at the head of the Ebbw Fach River whilst Carno Reservoir is about 1km downstream where the open moorland was afforested during the twentieth century. Shon-Sheffrey's Reservoir lies on the Sirhowy River at the moor's southwestern margin. Llangynidr Reservoir is supplemented by feeder channels constructed across the moor from tributary streams of the Ebbw Fach which otherwise empty into the main river below the dam.

== Archaeology ==
There are numerous ancient cairns on this tract of moorland, the most notable of which are Garn Fawr ('big cairn') and Carn Caws ('cheese cairn'). Other prehistoric cairns and a stone row together with evidence of house platforms occur towards its northern edge.

== Access ==
The mountain is mapped as open country and therefore freely available for walkers to roam at will. There are few defined paths though two public footpaths cross from north to south from Llangynidr towards Tredegar. The B4560 road from Garnllydan to Llangynidr cuts across the high moorland to the east of the mountain and offers the easiest access to both Mynydd Llangynidr and to Mynydd Llangatwg to its east. To the west a minor road heads north from the A465 Heads of the Valleys Road through the small village of Trefil and continues north as a bridleway, also offering easy access to the hill.
