= Pennant Measures =

Geological term for rock in south Wales

The Pennant Measures is the traditional name for a sequence of sedimentary rocks of the South Wales Coalfield. They were also referred to as the Upper Coal Measures and assigned to the Westphalian 'C' and Westphalian 'D' stages of the Carboniferous Period. The Pennant Measures were divided into the Lower Pennant Measures and the Upper Pennant Measures, differing from the underlying Middle and Lower Coal Measures in being principally of sandstone units – known collectively as the Pennant Sandstone – with mudstone being the subsidiary rock type. Numerous coal seams occur within the Pennant Measures though they are less common than in the underlying Coal Measures.

However recent reclassification of the sequence has resulted in the definition by the British Geological Survey of the Pennant Sandstone Formation as a sub-unit of the newly established Warwickshire Group. The formation is recognised to be of Bolsovian to 'Westphalian D' age. It overlies the uppermost strata of the newly defined South Wales Coal Measures Group and underlies the rocks of the succeeding Grovesend Formation. The Pennant Sandstone Formation is now formally subdivided (in ascending order) into the Llynfi, Rhondda, Brithdir, Hughes and Swansea members, each of which units formerly had 'bed' status.

Being relatively resistant to erosion, the Pennant Sandstones form the plateau surface of the Coalfield into which the coalfield valleys have been deeply incised by water and ice. They reach their greatest height (though not their highest stratigraphic level) at the flat summit of Craig y Llyn where they are represented by the Hughes Member.

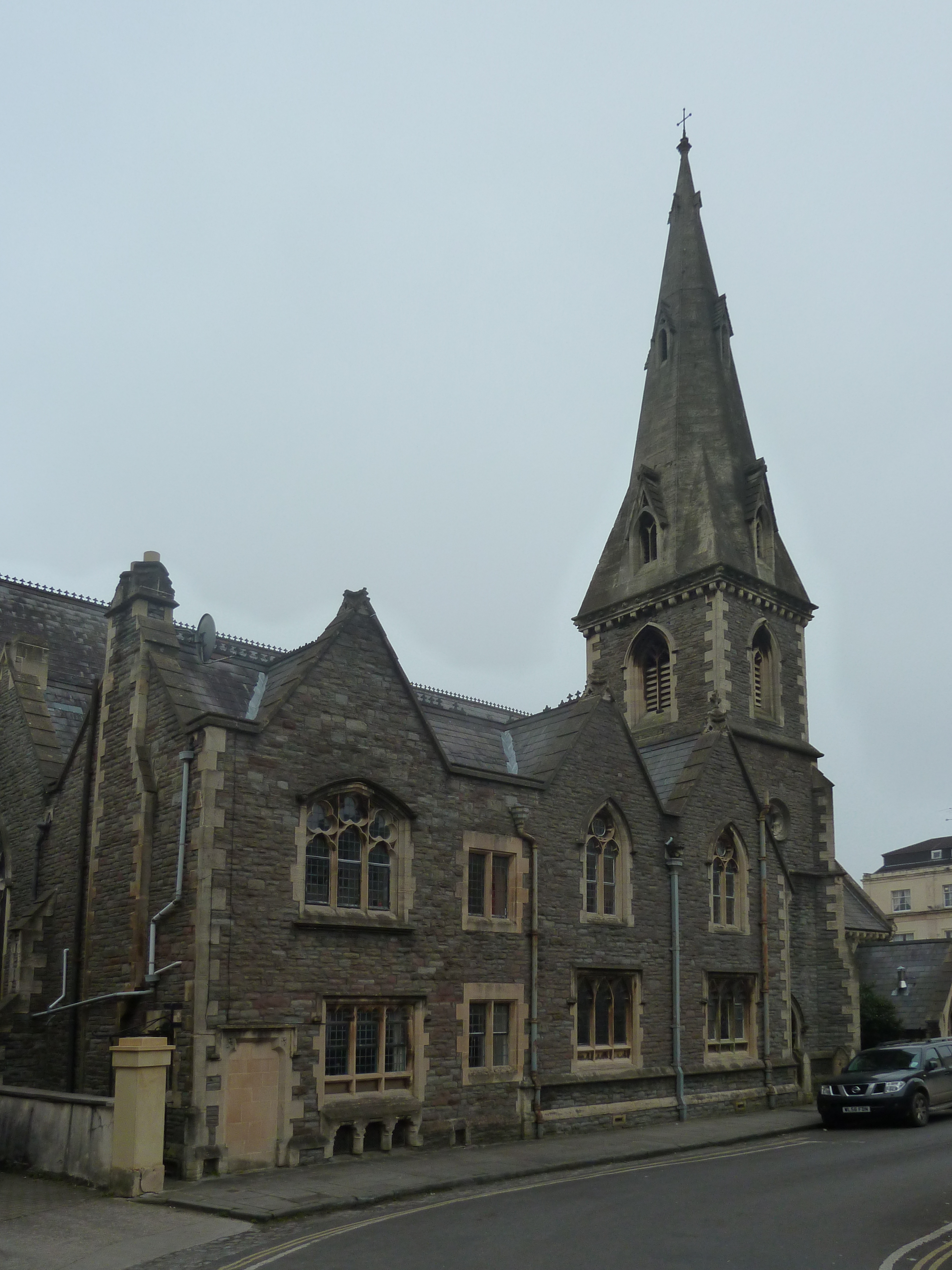
St Paul's Church, Bristol, constructed largely of grey Pennant Sandstone with Bath stone around the door and window frames

The sandstone were quarried both in South Wales and the Bristol area for use in paving and roofing is also known as Pennant Stone.
