= Geology of Anglesey =

Overview of the geology of the isle of Anglesey, Wales

The geology of Anglesey, the largest (714 km^{2}) island in Wales is some of the most complex in the country. Anglesey has relatively low relief, the 'grain' of which runs northeast–southwest, i.e. ridge and valley features extend in that direction reflecting not only the trend of the late Precambrian and Palaeozoic age bedrock geology but also the direction in which glacial ice traversed and scoured the island during the last ice age. It was realised in the 1980s that the island is composed of multiple terranes, recognition of which is key to understanding its Precambrian and lower Palaeozoic evolution. The interpretation of the island's geological complexity has been debated amongst geologists for decades and recent research continues in that vein.

== History of geological study ==
The first geological map of Anglesey was published in 1822 by John Stevens Henslow. It was Edward Greenly who provided the first detailed map of the island in 1920, a year after the publication of a two-part geological memoir following painstaking work, during the course of which he identified and named the mélange. Greenly's work was conducted in the era before the recognition of plate tectonics as the broader context within which geological processes take place. It was from the 1960s that plate tectonic interpretations of Anglesey's geology were put forward by geologists such as Dennis Wood who introduced the concept of an olistostrome to account for the intimately mixed lithologies on the north coast. Through the work of Gibbons and others in the 1980s, it was realised that the island is composed of multiple terranes, separated by faulted boundaries. Subsequently, the concept of 'underplating' at a destructive plate margin has been used to help explain the disposition of the disparate rock sequences. More recently again, work has demonstrated structural links with the Caledonian orogen in northeastern America, enabling Anglesey's wider tectonic context to be better understood.

== Precambrian ==
A Blueschist belt extends across the interior of the south - the Central Anglesey and Berw shear zones containing Ediacaran age rocks.

The schists of the Gwna Group date from Ediacaran to Early Cambrian times. They extend north from Menai Bridge to the eastern shores of Red Wharf Bay (or Traeth Coch) and from Aberffraw Bay northeast to beyond Cefni Reservoir. Smaller outcrops extend northeast from Llanddwyn Island and in the Pentraeth area. Each of these areas includes igneous rocks too, including pillow lavas and tuffs. The schists are also present to the north and east of Llanfaethlu, at Mynydd Bodafon and patchily along the north coast. Though these schemes have been and continue to be subject to change, the Monian Supergroup has in recent times been considered to include the Fydlyn Felsite Formation (or Fydlyn Group), the Gwna Group, New Harbour Group (within which the Skerries Formation, Church Bay Tuffs & Skerries Grits, Lynas Formation and Bodelwyn Formation are defined), the Holy Island Group and the Rhoscolyn, Holyhead and South Stack formations. It thereby extends into the Cambrian.

The Holyhead and Rhoscolyn formations, a succession of metamorphosed quartzites and sandstones with interbedded mudstones, is between 150 and 200m thick. Its outcrop is restricted to the Holyhead Mountain and Rhoscolyn areas of Holy Island. The Rhoscolyn Formation is metamorphosed sandstones and silty mudstones with some quartzite.

== Cambrian ==
Rocks of the South Stack and New Harbour Groups are of Cambrian age. The South Stack Formation which may be over 1 km thick in places comprises metamorphosed sandstones and silty mudstones and is considered to be of late Cambrian/early Ordovician age. It outcrops on Holy Island between Holyhead and South Stack and at Rhoscolyn and also between Mynydd Mechell and Carreglefn inland on Anglesey itself.

== Ordovician ==
Anglesey's Ordovician rock strata, largely interbedded mudstones and sandstones, lie unconformably on Precambrian and Cambrian basement. The main outcrop extends from Dulas Bay inland via Rhosybol and Llanbabo to the coast west of Llanfairynghornwy with an extension southwest via Bryngwran to the coast at Rhosneigr. The basal beds are conglomeratic in nature. A second smaller outcrop extends southwest from Capel Coch (Welsh: 'red chapel', reflecting the colour of building stone), through Llangwyllog. Another stretches north from Beaumaris and a fourth one extends southwest from Red Wharf Bay (Traeth Coch: 'red beach', reflecting the colour of the extensive sandflats at low tide).

== Silurian: Mynydd Parys ==
It is at Mynydd Parys (Parys Mountain), just to the south of Amlwch, that the only outcrop of rocks of early Silurian age can be found on Anglesey.

== Old Red Sandstone ==
A narrow outcrop of Old Red Sandstone extends from Dulas Bay on the east coast, inland to the northern edge of Llangefni, the only outcrop of these strata in North Wales. A relative lack of fossils means that dating the sequence is problematic but, like the sequence in the Anglo-Welsh basin in South Wales, it is considered to straddle the Silurian/Devonian boundary. The coastal outcrop at Dulas Bay is considered to be important both for its fine displays of cyclical fluvial sedimentation but also for being the first place where epsilon cross-bedding was recognised in ancient rocks. The sequence has traditionally been divided into four; a lowermost Bodafon Formation overlain successively by the Traeth Bach, Porth-y-Mor and Traeth Lligwy formations.The Bodafon Formation is conglomeratic, the individual clasts being an assortment of Precambrian rocks of local provenance. Calcretes (carbonate palaeosols) are well developed in the middle two formations,

== Carboniferous ==
Rocks of Carboniferous age occur in three parts of the island, the largest part of which, known as the 'Principal area', extends from the east coast between Lligwy Bay and Red Wharf Bay, narrowing southwestwards to the south of Llangefni to reach the southwest coast though is almost wholly concealed beneath younger deposits at Malltraeth Marsh (Cors Ddyga). Its southeastern boundary is largely defined by the Berw Fault. A smaller outcrop, the 'Straitside area', occupies the coastal belt southwest from Llanfairpwllgwyngyll; it too disappears under recent deposits at the southwest corner of the island. A third smaller outcrop, occupies the eastern extremity of Anglesey - the 'Penmon area' - and includes Puffin Island and is restricted to limestone only.

The basal beds of the Carboniferous succession on Anglesey are of Holkerian to Asbian age and are termed the Lligwy Sandstone Formation. These sandstones and conglomerates with some siltstone and mudstone record the initial influx of sediment from the Wales-Brabant massif immediately to the south, onto an eroded surface of lower Palaeozoic and late Precambrian rocks. Their outcrop, which is up to 60m in thickness, extends from Lligwy Bay southwest to Llangefni. This succession has previously also been known as the Basement Conglomerate or Basement Beds.

=== Carboniferous Limestone ===
As elsewhere in Britain, subdivision of the Carboniferous Limestone has undergone many changes over the years and reference is found in the literature to a confusing array of names. The first detailed descriptions of the limestone were provided by G.H.Morton between 1870 and 1901, just as the (British) Geological Survey was conducting its own survey and publication on the area. Morton's scheme distinguished the Lower Brown, Middle White and Upper Grey limestones. From the 1970s the limestone was subdivided into the various zones based on the presence of the coral genus Dibunophyllum; more recently again a series of formation names has been applied within an overall Clwyd Limestone Group. The outcrops on Anglesey form part of a wider assemblage across North Wales which is interpreted as recording the gradual transgression of the sea southwards and the establishment of a carbonate ramp and shelf during the early Carboniferous. In Carboniferous palaeogeography, this area, marginal to the Eastern Irish Sea Basin is known as the North Wales Shelf. The northernmost outcrop of the limestone forms the islet of Ynys Dulas, 1 km off the northeastern coast. Puffin Island / Ynys Seiriol provides the easternmost outcrop. In common with the rest of the Penmon area, the limestone here is divided into a Loggerheads Limestone Formation and an overlying Cefn Mawr Limestone Formation. Both formations record episodes of cyclical sedimentation reflecting contemporary changes in sea level. The latter includes some thin sandstones whilst both include palaeosol horizons and calcretes indicating that the area lay above sea level from time to time, permitting the development of palaeokarsts.

=== Upper Carboniferous strata ===
Mudstone, siltstone and sandstone strata within the 'Principal area', overlying the limestone, are assigned to the Millstone Grit Group. These are overlain by similar rocks assigned to the Pennine Coal Measures Group, coal seams within which provided the basis for a former small scale mining industry. The Coal Measures and Millstone Grit strata are only found to the south of Llangefni and are largely concealed by modern tidal flat deposits which extend far inland hereabouts. Interbedded mudstones and sandstones of Westphalian age which crop out along the western parts of the Menai Strait were traditionally known as 'Red Measures' but have more recently been designated the Plas Brereton Formation.

== Geological structure ==
Amongst the named geological structures affecting Anglesey are the Berw, Llyn Traffwyl and Porth Nobla faults and Carmel Head and Helin Fen thrusts and the Rhoscolyn Anticline and Porth Penrhyn-mawr Syncline. Recent work (Schofield et al., 2020) recognises the Penmynydd, Aberffraw, Coedana, Porth y Felin and Amlwch terranes.

== Quaternary ==
The most significant of the unconsolidated deposits which have been laid down in the last 2.6 million years are those associated with the last ice age and with post-glacial coastal processes.

=== Glacial legacy ===
The island was submerged during the last ice age by a southwest flowing stream of Irish Sea ice which reached a maximum thickness of 1 km. The legacy is a swarm of drumlins and a thick spread of glacial till and sporadic glacio-fluvial deposits. The Irish Sea-derived till is typically red/brown coloured reflecting the Permo-Triassic sandstone and mudstone bedrock of the seafloor from which the material originated. It also contains fragments from further afield including such lithologies as granite from Ailsa Craig and flint from Northern Ireland. In general, ice sourced from the Welsh mainland did not travel further north than the Menai Strait. In places the bedrock has been polished and striated. Global sea levels were suppressed during the ice age and it was only just over 5000 years ago that they had once again risen sufficiently to separate the island from the Welsh mainland.

=== Post-glacial deposits ===
The sands which form extensive beaches and dune systems such as that at Newborough Warren derive from the erosion of glacial deposits and redistribution of the sediment by rising seas and by wind. Submerged forests are found in several places such as at Trearddur, Lligwy and Lleiniog. They were killed by rising sea levels around 6–8000 years ago. Alluvium (sand, silts and gravel) occupies flatter expanses of valleys and innumerable hollows around the island. There are extensive tidal flat deposits between Anglesey and Holy island, at Red Wharf Bay, Malltraeth Sands and Traeth Melynog, the last named being protected by the sand spit of Menai Point.

== Economic geology ==
Coal was worked on a small scale from the fifteenth to the nineteenth century in the vicinity of Malltraeth Marsh. Igneous and metamorphic rocks continue to be worked at Hengae Quarry near Llangaffo, at Gwalchmai and at Gwyndy quarry near Llanerchymedd whilst limestone is extracted from Rhuddlan Bach and Nant Newydd quarries east of Benllech and from Aber quarry to its north. Moss peat is still exploited at Ynys Isaf near Brynteg.

=== Building stone ===
A number of now abandoned quarries have been identified as sources of building stone including those supplying Precambrian stone at Beaumaris and limestone at Penmon at the eastern tip of the island, an also at Bryn Engan, Castell Mawr, Upper Benllech and Moelfre in the vicinity of Benllech. The Lligwy Sandstone was worked at Creigiau to the northwest of Benllech whilst Ordovician sandstones were had at Ballog near Llaneillian. A quarry at Rhoscolyn exploited a serpentinite intrusion whilst further north on Holy Island, the 'Breakwater Quarries' were opened up in the 'Holyhead Quartzite'.

== Geoconservation ==
A Geodiversity Partnership was set up in 2005 to deliver a Local Geodiversity Action Plan and to secure the island the status of European Geopark, something which was achieved in 2009. Along with other such Geoparks in the UK, it became a UNESCO Global Geopark in 2015.

=== IUGS geological heritage site ===
In respect of the site having 'spectacular, accessible and well-preserved exposures of late Neoproterozoic-Cambrian mélange with more than 200 years of study', the International Union of Geological Sciences (IUGS) included the 'Ynys Llanddwyn late Neoproterozoic-Cambrian Mélange' in its assemblage of 100 'geological heritage sites' around the world in a listing published in October 2022. The organisation defines an IUGS Geological Heritage Site as 'a key place with geological elements and/or processes of international scientific relevance, used as a reference, and/or with a substantial contribution to the development of geological sciences through history.'

== See also ==
- Geology of the United Kingdom
- Geology of Wales
