= Marros Group =

Geological term for rock in south Wales

- Stratigraphic range: Namurian
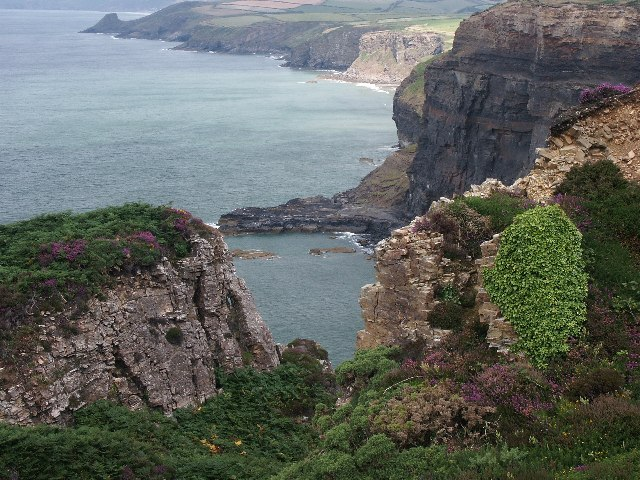
- Sandstones and interbedded mudstones of the Telpyn Point Sandstone Formation, Haroldston Chins, St Bride's Bay
- Type: Group
- Sub-units: Aberkenfig Formation, Bishopston Formation, Twrch Sandstone Formation, Telpyn Point Sandstone Formation
- Underlies: Coal Measures Group
- Overlies: Pembroke Limestone Group
- Thickness: 20 m to 750 m

Lithology
- Primary: mudstone sandstone
- Other: chert, limestone

Location
- Country: Wales
- Extent: South Wales Coalfield, Pembrokeshire

The Marros Group is the name given to a suite of rocks of Namurian age laid down during the Carboniferous Period in South Wales. These rocks were formerly known as the Millstone Grit Series but are now distinguished from the similar but geographically separate rock sequences of the Pennines and Peak District of northern England and northeast Wales by this new name.

== Stratigraphy ==
The Group comprises a thick unit of coarse sandstone known as the Twrch Sandstone (formerly the ‘Basal Grit’) which is overlain by the Bishopston Mudstone and the Telpyn Point Sandstone. The mudstones of these latter two formations was formerly known as the ‘Middle Shales’, a name reflecting the position of this sequence sandwiched between the Basal Grit below and the Farewell Rock, the lowermost sandstone of the South Wales Coal Measures, above. The mudstone itself contains a few bands of sandstone such as the ‘Twelve Foot Sandstone’ and locally the ‘Cumbriense Sandstone’. Likewise the Twrch Sandstone contains bands of mudstone, often correlating with marine bands.

The sequence as developed along the north crop of the South Wales Coalfield varies along its length but within the mudstone which forms the greater thickness of the Bishopston Mudstone Formation, the following are observed:

- Subcrenatum Sandstone
- Cumbriense Quartzite
- Sub-Cumbriense Sandstone
- Sub-Carbonicola Sandstone
- Sub-Cancellatum Sandstone
- Twelve-foot Sandstone

Note that the names of many of the sandstone units are derived from the marine bands (themselves named for diagnostic fossils within them) beneath which they typically occur. Not all of the sandstones occur within any one place, the Subcrenatum thins out to the east whilst the typically double-layered Cumbriense Sandstone thins out to the west. Further west in Pembrokeshire the sequence above and including the Sub-Carbonicola is absent and is replaced by the Telpyn Point Sandstone Formation.

== Landscapes ==
The Twrch Sandstone Formation gives rise to numerous positive landscape features such as Carreg Dwfn, Tair Carn Uchaf, Gwaun Cefnygarreg in the west of the Brecon Beacons National Park and the plateau surfaces of Mynydd Llangatwg and Mynydd Llangynidr in the east. Faulted blocks of the Twrch Sandstone and Bishopston Mudstone formations are responsible for much of the dramatic scenery within the national park's Waterfall Country.

The Marros Group is underlain by the Carboniferous Limestone, the boundary being unconformable. In contrast, the contact with the overlying Farewell Rock which lies at the base of the South Wales Coal Measures is conformable.

== Origin of names ==
The Marros Group is named from the locality (Marros) in southwest Carmarthenshire where these rocks are well exposed in spectacular coastal cliffs. The Twrch Sandstone derives its name from the vicinity of the Afon Twrch where these beds reach their maximum thickness. The mudstones derive their name from Bishopston on the Gower Peninsula, southwest of Swansea and the Telpyn Point Sandstone from the coastal locality of that name near Marros.
