= Farewell Rock =

Geological term for sandstones in Wales

Coordinates: 51.9250°N 3.4884°W

The Farewell Rock is the name given to a series of sandstones at the boundary of the Coal Measures with the underlying Marros Group in South Wales. Once thought to be a single sandstone, it is now accepted that the same name has been applied to several different sandstones of similar age across the South Wales Coalfield. The sandstone unit known as the Farewell Rock in the Pembrokeshire Coalfield is continuous with the Cumbriense Quartzite of the main South Wales Coalfield. These are assigned to the uppermost part of the Marros Group (the former Millstone Grit Series) which is of Namurian age. In the South Wales Coalfield, the name is given to a thicker, overlying (and hence younger) sandstone unit which, though formerly assigned to the Millstone Grit Series, is now assigned to the Lower Coal Measures which are of Westphalian age.

The name is said to have been coined by ironstone miners who once worked the siderite deposits which stratigraphically overlie this rock unit. Digging beyond i.e. deeper than this bed would yield no further iron ore and so, on reaching it, they could bid a 'farewell' to further riches. The name was subsequently adopted by colliers in search of coal which occurs in the same Coal Measures strata. The Farewell Rock has itself been worked for the production of refractory bricks, the high purity of the sandstone (over 98% silica) being suitable for this purpose.
