= Telpyn Point =

Headland in Wales

Coordinates: 51.735°N 4.629°W

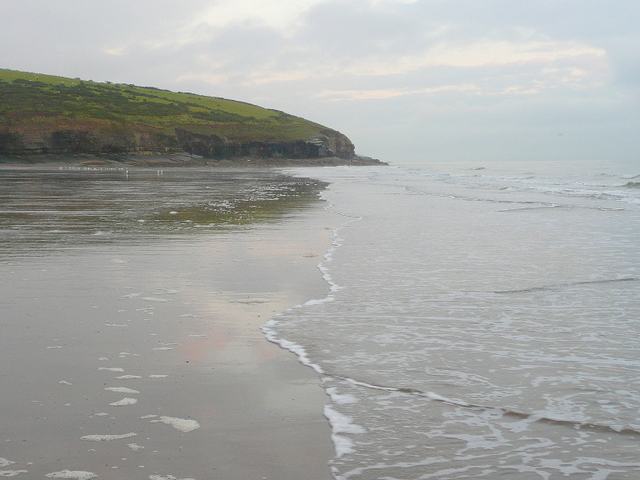
Telpyn Point

Telpyn Point is a headland on the Carmarthenshire coast, Wales. Set at the back of Carmarthen Bay, to its east are Marros Sands and to the west a beach which stretches in front of the Pembrokeshire village of Amroth. There are numerous sea caves in the quartzitic sandstone cliffs here. A path around the headland carries the Wales Coast Path. The Marros-Pendine Coast is protected as a 'mixed' Site of Special Scientific Interest, i.e. for its biological and geological interest. The good geological exposure of Carboniferous age rock strata at Telpyn Point has led to its name being given to the Telpyn Point Sandstone Formation, a sub-unit of the Marros Group, the modern scientific name for the Millstone Grit series of South Wales.
