= South Wales Coal Measures Group =

Lithostratigraphical term in the UK

- Stratigraphic range: Langsettian-Westphalian
- Type: Group
- Unit of: Coal Measures Supergroup
- Underlies: Warwickshire Group
- Overlies: Marros Group
- Thickness: up to 1600m

Lithology
- Primary: mudstone, sandstone
- Other: siltstone, coal, seatearth

Location
- Region: South Wales, southern England
- Extent: across south Wales and southern England

Type section
- Named for: South Wales

The South Wales Coal Measures Group is a lithostratigraphical term referring to the coal-bearing succession of rock strata which occur in South Wales within the Westphalian Stage of the Carboniferous Period. The Group name is also applied to rocks of similar age across southern England from the Bristol Coalfield east to the concealed Oxfordshire, Berkshire and Kent Coalfields. In formal use, the term replaces the earlier Coal Measures Group The Group comprises the:

- South Wales Upper Coal Measures Formation
- South Wales Middle Coal Measures Formation
- South Wales Lower Coal Measures Formation

The term 'Productive Coal Measures' was formerly used for this succession. Note that, other than a 0-30m thick sequence immediately above the Cambriense Marine Band, the South Wales rock sequence which had formerly been assigned to the 'Upper Coal Measures' (which was also referred to as the 'Pennant Measures') is no longer considered to be a part of the Coal Measures and is now designated as the Warwickshire Group which is itself subdivided into the Pennant Sandstone Formation and overlying Grovesend Formation.

In South Wales, the South Wales Coal Measures Group is preceded (underlain) by the Marros Group which is of Namurian age though in southeast England, the Coal Measures directly overlies Devonian strata. It is succeeded (overlain) by the Warwickshire Group which comprises a largely non-productive sequence of red beds - the former 'Barren Coal Measures'.

The South Wales Coal Measures Group spans a time from the Langsettian to the Bolsovian sub-age.
