= Chartist Cave =

Cave on Mynydd Llangynidr, Powys, Wales

Coordinates: 51.83123°N 3.27119°W

- Interactive map of Chartist Cave
- Location: Mynydd Llangynidr
- Length: 440 metres (1,444 ft)
- Geology: Limestone
- Access: unrestricted

Chartist Cave (or sometimes Chartist's or Chartists' Cave) is a culturally significant cave on Mynydd Llangynidr in southern Powys, Wales. The entrance is a broad arch formed of Twrch Sandstone ('Millstone Grit') which overlies the Carboniferous Limestone immediately beneath.

== The cave ==
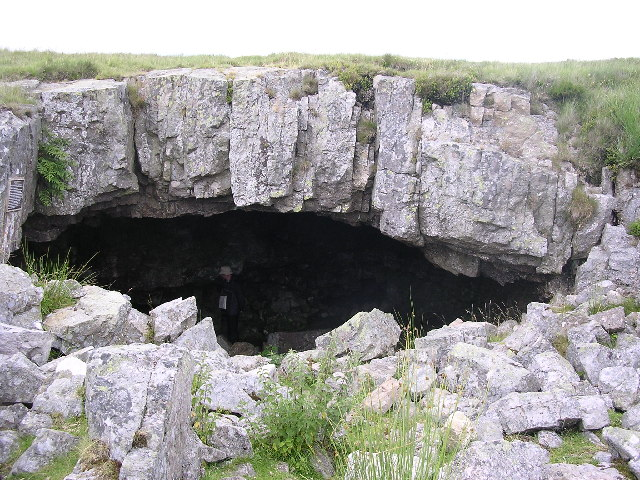
Entrance to the cave

The cave is located at about 2.5 kilometres (1.6 mi) north-northeast of the village of Trefil at an elevation of about 550 metres (1,800 ft), at OS grid reference SO 127152 (51.8286 degrees North, 3.2672 degrees West). The entrance to Chartist Cave is high on the moors near the summit of Mynydd Llangynidr. The arched entrance is formed by a Twrch Sandstone ('Millstone Grit') cap from beneath which the underlying limestone has been eroded. The cave is also known by two different names in Welsh: Ogof Fawr (the 'Big Cave') and earlier as Tylles Fawr (the 'Great Hole'). The more commonly used modern name derives from 1839 when Chartist rebels used the cave to stockpile weapons in advance of their march on Newport in November of that year. There is a plaque at the entrance commemorating the Chartists' actions.

Digging by the Severn Valley Caving Club, in 1969 and 1970, led to the discovery of a passage dropping to a lower chamber with many passages leading off. The known length of the cave is 440 metres (1,440 ft) but it is believed to form a part of a much more extensive cave system beneath the moors. In the cave were found a clay pipe, a flat perforated stone, and both animal and human bones. The stone may have been of considerable antiquity, but the human bones were thought to be between fifty and one hundred years old.

The cave is included in the Mynydd Llangynidr Site of Special Scientific Interest designated in August 2012 by the Countryside Council for Wales on the basis of the karstic landscape found here.
