= Canonbie Coalfield =

Coal mining region in southern Scotland

Coordinates: 55.0787°N 2.9528°W

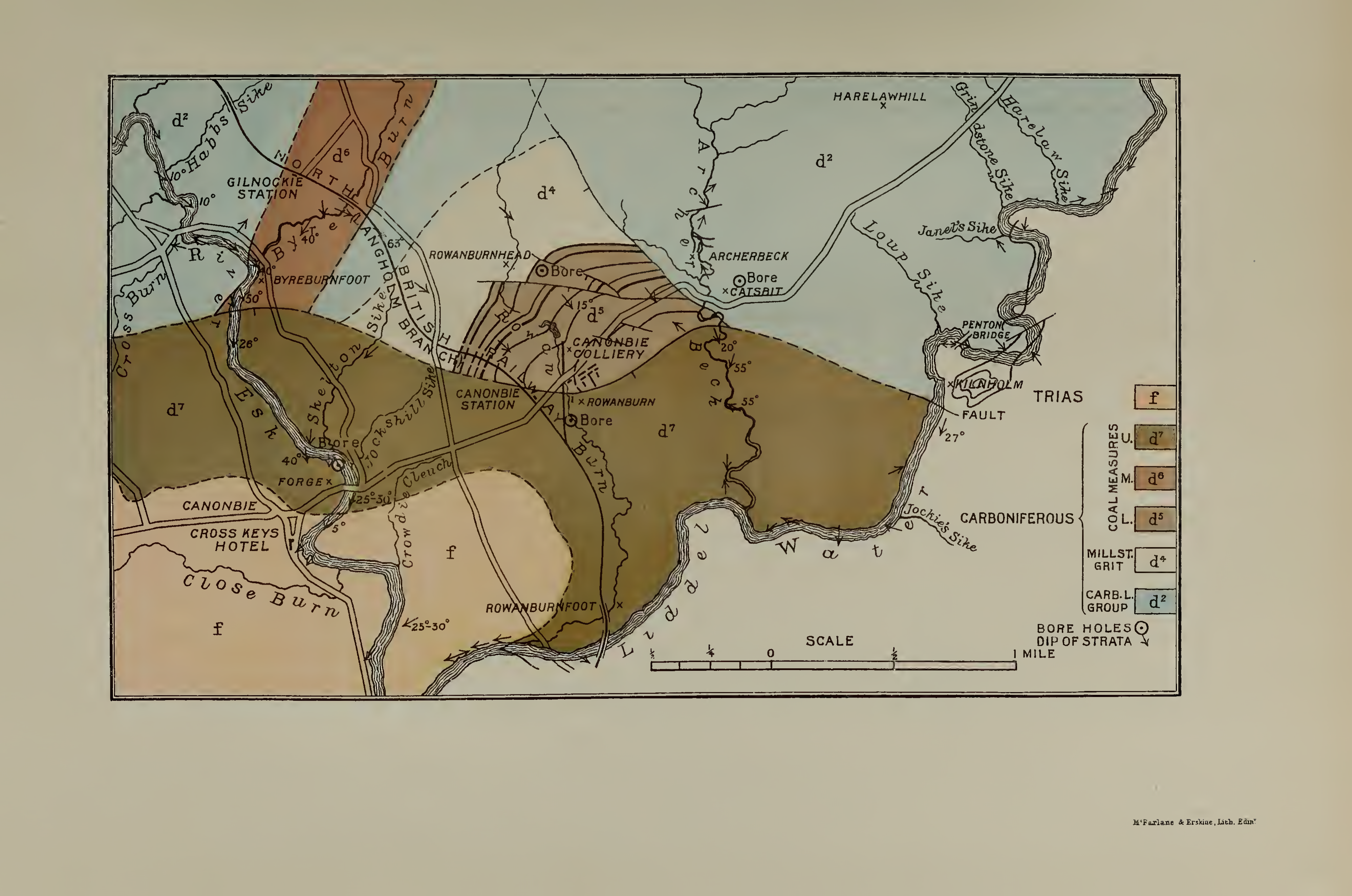
Geological Map of the Canonbie Coalfield. From Peach and Horne (1903)

The Canonbie Coalfield is a small and largely concealed coalfield at Canonbie in the south of Scotland. A comprehensive survey by Peach and Horne was published in 1903. Canonbie colliery was worked until 1920, and another mine at Archerbeck continued until 1942. There are some Eighteenth Century documents extant referring to coal mines at Archerbeck, Skeltonscleugh, Byerburn, Knottyholm and Fairy Loup.

Recent work has indicated potentially economically workable reserves beneath a cover of New Red Sandstone rocks.

The following coal seams occur within the Pennine Middle Coal Measures Formation in this coalfield:

- Knottyholm
- Archerbeck
- Six Foot
- Nine Foot
- Five Foot
- Eight Foot
- Seven Foot

Further less important seams lie within the underlying Pennine Lower Coal Measures Formation and within the overlying strata of the Pennine Upper Coal Measures Formation and the Warwickshire Group including the 'High Coal' at the base of the latter.

== New Proposal ==
In 2014, New Age Exploration Limited proposed a new coal mine in the Canonbie area. They estimated that the new mine could operate for 26 years and yield 1.4 million tonnes of coal per annum. The emphasis was upon Coking coal as opposed to power station coal which would be a prime market in the UK and EU.
