= Rough Rock =

This page is about a sandstone in northern England. For the census-designated place in Arizona see Rough Rock, Arizona

The Rough Rock is a widespread unit of coarse sandstone which is a prominent landscape-forming feature in the Peak District and Pennines of northern England. It is assigned by geologists to the Yeadonian sub-stage of the Namurian stage of the Carboniferous period.

It is the most extensive of all of the sandstones of the Millstone Grit Group occurring throughout the Peak District, South and West Pennines and extending northwards into the central and northern Pennines.

It originated as a sheet of deltaic deposits spread across most of the Pennine Basin associated with major rivers flowing from the north and northeast.
