= Carreg Dwfn =

Hill (283m) in Carmarthenshire, Wales

Coordinates: 51.8382°N 3.9530°W

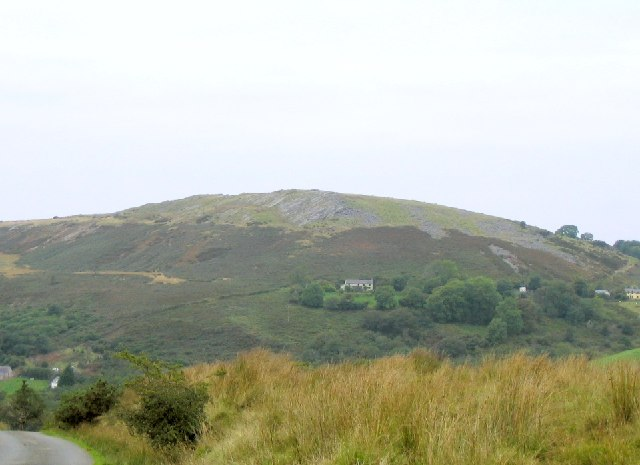
Carreg Dwfn, viewed from the southeast

Carreg Dwfn (also referred to as Careg Dwfn and Carregydwfn and referred to also as Careg-y-dwfan ) is a hill four miles southeast of Llandeilo and just to the south of the village of Trap in the county of Carmarthenshire, south Wales. It lies at the western extremity of the Brecon Beacons National Park and Fforest Fawr Geopark. Its summit at 283 metres (928 ft) is towards the eastern end of a rocky east-west-aligned ridge.

== Geology ==
The hill is formed from the coarse Twrch Sandstone (formerly known as the Basal Grit) laid down during the Namurian stage of the Carboniferous period. It is defined by faults to east and west. There are a handful of disused gritstone quarries on the southern slope of the hill. Quarrying rights at these sites were stopped by the Brecon Beacons National Park Authority in 2008. To its north is the large Craigyrodyn Quarry which worked the Carboniferous Limestone outcrop which parallels the narrow band of Twrch Sandstone running west to east through the region. Glacial striae on rock surfaces high on the hill record that during the ice age, glacial ice travelled obliquely across it towards the southwest though lower down, to the south, the ice is recorded as moving more or less from east to west.

== Access ==
Carreg Dwfn is designated as open country under the provisions of the CRoW Act 2000. Public footpaths run around the western, northern and eastern sides.
