= Trap, Carmarthenshire =

Village in Carmarthenshire, Wales

Coordinates: 51°51′11″N 3°57′26″W

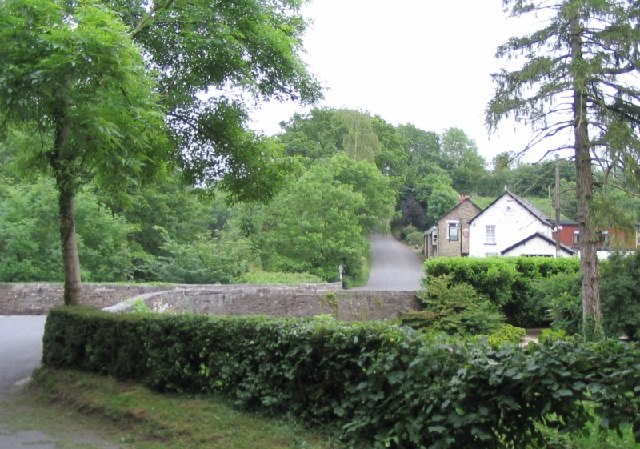
Trap, just downstream from Carreg Cennen Castle. Pictured are the bridge over the river and the Cennen Arms pub.

Trap (or Trapp) is a hamlet in the county of Carmarthenshire in southwest Wales, located on the western border of the Brecon Beacons National Park, around four miles southeast of the town of Llandeilo. It is unclear whether the name – which often appears as Trapp on maps, although the spelling with a single p is generally preferred locally – refers to a fish-trap, a water-trap (mill-leat), or, given that the village is in Cwm Lladron ("robbers' valley"), an ambush point.

The Afon Cennen flows through the village and is bridged there by the road from Ffairfach to Drefach. One mile to the east, and visible from the village, are the remains of Carreg Cennen Castle, whilst to the south is the rocky Carreg Dwfn, the westernmost hill of the national park. The remains of Capel Dewi, a medieval chapel, are situated to the east of the road south of the village.

== Amenities ==
There is a public house in the village, though both the post office and the former village school have now closed. The village still brings in visitors with events such as the Trap Show, held on the last Saturday in July, at which there are competitions such as largest vegetable and prize animals and the annual Trap Fun Run, the 25th staging of which took place in May 2012. Trap Community Association purchased and refurbished the old school building and it was opened by Lord Dynevor on 29 September 2012 as a community centre for residents and visitors. Brecon Carreg's bottling plant is situated just to the southeast of the village.
