= Dennis Wood =

Welsh geologist

Dennis Wood (1934–2001) was a Welsh geologist who did important work on strain analysis. In his work on the Geology of Anglesey, Wood argued for the complex mix of lithologies in the north of the island to be an olistostrome related to a subduction zone.
