= Afon Cennen =

River in Carmarthenshire, Wales

Coordinates: 51.87617°N 3.98941°W

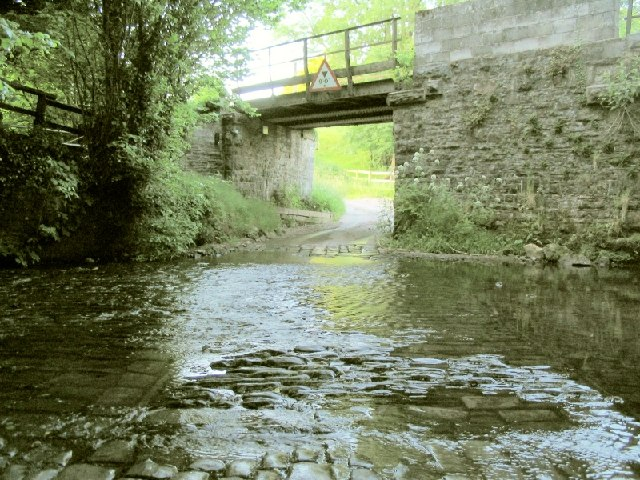
Ford and railway bridge near Meusydd

The Afon Cennen is a river in the county of Carmarthenshire, south Wales. It rises on the northern slopes of the Black Mountain to the east of the summit of Tair Carn Uchaf and flows north to Blaencennen Farm, then westwards past Carreg Cennen Castle, continuing through the village of Trap where it exits the Brecon Beacons National Park. Near the hamlet of Derwydd it turns northwest for a mile then northeast to run through the village of Ffairfach to its confluence with the River Towy opposite Llandeilo.

The name could derive either from 'cen' meaning lichen or else from a personal name.
