= Marker horizon =

Stratigraphic units used to correlate the age of strata in rocks

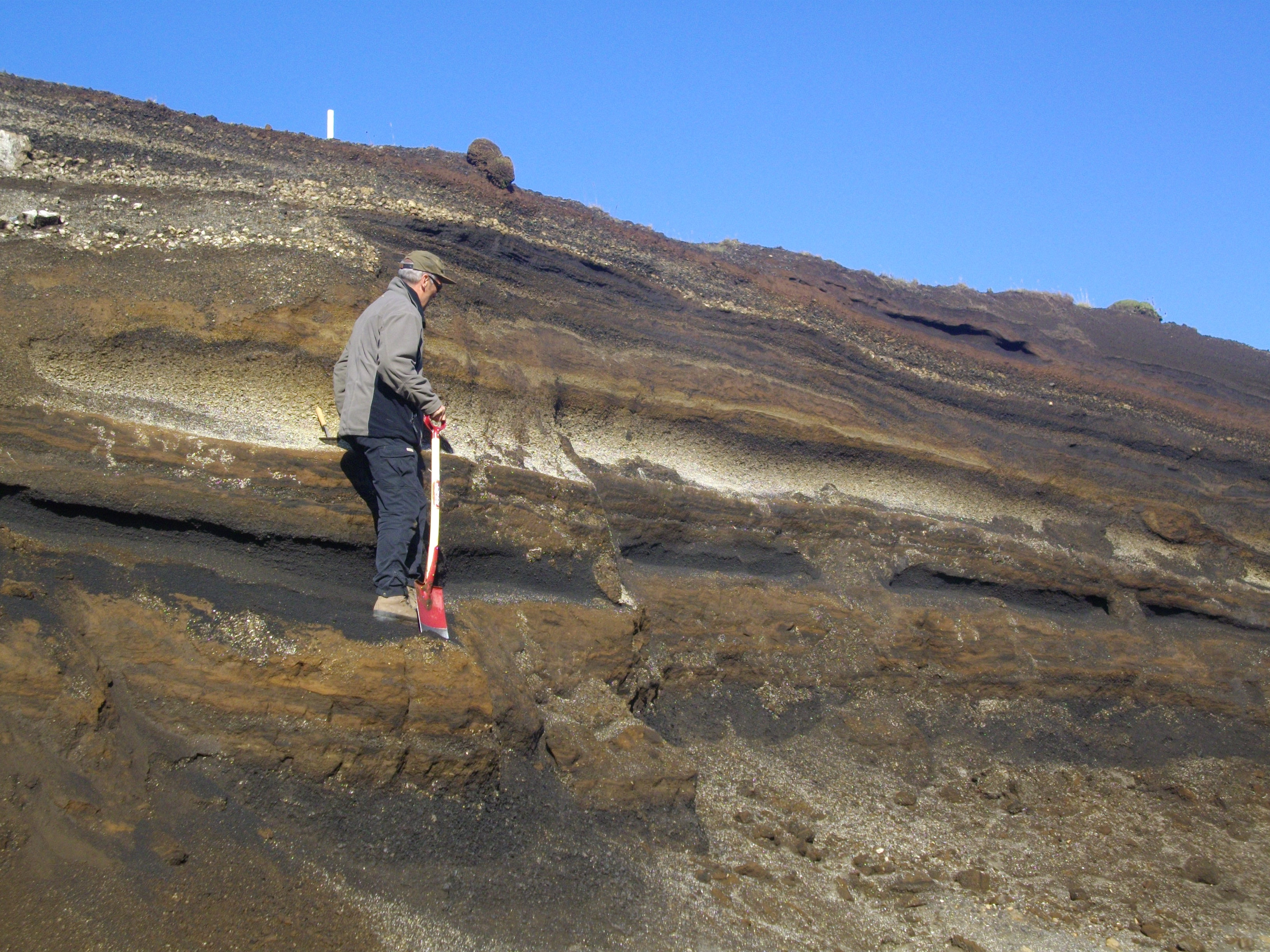
Tephra horizons in Iceland

Marker horizons (also referred to as chronohorizons, key beds or marker beds) are stratigraphic units of the same age and of such distinctive composition and appearance that, despite their presence in separate geographic locations, there is no doubt about their being of equivalent age (isochronous) and of common origin. Such clear markers facilitate the correlation of strata, and used in conjunction with fossil floral and faunal assemblages and paleomagnetism, permit the mapping of land masses and bodies of water throughout the history of the earth. They usually consist of a relatively thin layer of sedimentary rock that is readily recognized on the basis of either its distinct physical characteristics or fossil content and can be mapped over a very large geographic area. As a result, a key bed is useful for correlating sequences of sedimentary rocks over a large area. Typically, key beds were created as the result of either instantaneous events or (geologically speaking) very short episodes of the widespread deposition of a specific types of sediment. As the result, key beds often can be used for both mapping and correlating sedimentary rocks and dating them. Volcanic ash beds (tonsteins and bentonite beds) and impact spherule beds, and specific megaturbidites are types of key beds created by instantaneous events. The widespread accumulation of distinctive sediments over a geologically short period of time have created key beds in the form of peat beds, coal beds, shell beds, marine bands, black shales in cyclothems, and oil shales. A well-known example of a key bed is the global layer of iridium-rich impact ejecta that marks the Cretaceous–Paleogene boundary (K–T boundary).

Palynology, the study of fossil pollens and spores, routinely works out the stratigraphy of rocks by comparing pollen and spore assemblages with those of well-known layers—a tool frequently used by petroleum exploration companies in the search for new fields. The fossilised teeth or elements of conodonts are an equally useful tool.

The ejecta from volcanoes and bolide impacts create useful markers, as different volcanic eruptions and impacts produce beds with distinctive compositions. Marker horizons of tephra are used as a dating tool in archaeology, since the dates of eruptions are generally well-established.

One particular bolide impact 66 million years ago, which formed the Chicxulub crater, produced an iridium anomaly that occurs in a thin, global layer of clay marking the Cretaceous–Paleogene boundary. Iridium layers are associated with bolide impacts and are not unique, but when occurring in conjunction with the extinction of specialised tropical planktic foraminifera and the appearance of the first Danian species, signal a reliable marker horizon for the Cretaceous–Paleogene boundary.

Fossil faunal and floral assemblages, both marine and terrestrial, make for distinctive marker horizons. Some marker units are distinctive by virtue of their magnetic qualities. The Water Tower Slates, forming part of the Hospital Hill Series in the Witwatersrand Basin, include a fine-grained ferruginous quartzite which is particularly magnetic. From the same series a ripple marked quartzite and a speckled bed are used as marker horizons.

On a much smaller time scale, marker horizons may be created by sedimentologists and limnologists in order to measure deposition and erosion rates in a marsh or pond environment. The materials used for such an artificial horizon are chosen for their visibility and stability and may be brick dust, grog, sand, kaolin, glitter or feldspar clay.

== See also ==
- Radiometric dating
- Relative dating
- Stratigraphy
