= Trefil =

Coordinates: 51.804841°N 3.276513°W

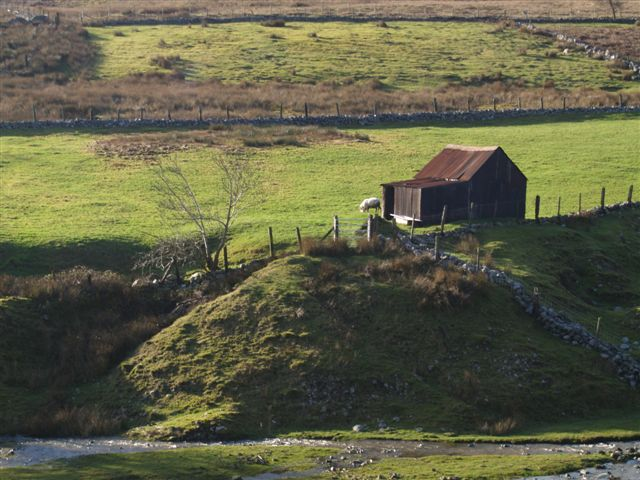

- Location within Blaenau Gwent
- OS grid reference: SO120125
- Principal area: Blaenau Gwent
- Preserved county: Gwent
- Country: Wales
- Sovereign state: United Kingdom
- Post town: TREDEGAR
- Postcode district: NP22
- Dialling code: 01495
- Police: Gwent
- Fire: South Wales
- Ambulance: Welsh
- UK Parliament: Blaenau Gwent and Rhymney
- Senedd Cymru – Welsh Parliament: Blaenau Gwent

Trefil is a small village in the county borough of Blaenau Gwent, south Wales. It lies at the top of the Sirhowy Valley, near to Brecon Beacons National Park. It is three miles northwest of Tredegar. With one public house, The Quarrymen’s Arms, serving homemade food and drinks to local visitors.

== Etymology ==
The village name may derive from the terms 'tref' and 'mil' signifying the 'farm of the lesser celandine', a plant which might be expected to grow in the stream which flows through the place, the Nant Trefil.

== Geography ==
The village is sited in the bottom of a broad valley which cuts through the moorlands between the Heads of the Valleys Road and the Dyffryn Crawnon valley to the north. At 409 metres (1,342 ft) above sea level, the Ordnance Survey recognise Trefil as the highest village in Wales. Trefil is served by a single cul-de-sac road which leaves the A465 Heads of the Valleys Road 1.5 miles to the south. The boundary of the Brecon Beacons National Park lies one mile to the north of the village. It is described by some as Wales' highest village..Trefil is the most Northerly Human Settlement in Blaenau Gwent

It is the last resting place of Aneurin Bevan

Trefil is perhaps best known for its limestone quarries – a major one immediately north of the village is operational whilst Cwar yr Ystrad, Cwar yr Hendre and Cwar Blaen-dyffryn to the west and northwest are no longer operational. The Trefil Tramroad and the Sirhowy Tramroad formerly linked the quarries with the heavily industrialised areas to the south, providing limestone for the furnaces. The former Brinore Tramroad connected the quarries at Trefil with the Monmouthshire and Brecon Canal at Talybont in the Usk Valley to the north.

Open moorland rises to east and west of the village, the slopes to the west being known as Trefil Ddu and those to the east as Trefil Las. The moorland of Mynydd Llangynidr to the east undulates considerably and contains a number of caves beneath its surface. Most famous amongst these is Chartist's Cave one mile to the northeast of the village.

== Nature ==
Trefil Quarries and Trefil Ddu are noted birdwatching sites; this area is the last remaining site in Gwent where ring ouzel occurs regularly, and other species present include raven, wheatear, stonechat, whinchat, snipe and red grouse.

== Arts and entertainment ==
Trefil found new fame in 2005 when it was used as a location for the alien Vogon homeworld in the film of Douglas Adams's book The Hitchhiker's Guide to the Galaxy.

In 2011 the Trefil Region was once again used as a filming location for a major Hollywood production when parts of a sequel to Clash of the Titans titled Wrath of the Titans, was filmed there.

In the Doctor Who universe, Trefil has featured as the Ood home planet and in The Sarah Jane Adventures.

The BBC TV series Merlin filmed many episodes at Trefil quarry.

The quarry features in many TV series including BBC's His Dark Materials and The Witcher for Netflix.

== Sports ==
The village is the site of Trefil Rugby Welfare Club who play in WRU Division 3C East. Of particular note is the derby between Trefil and Tredegar which is traditionally a strongly contested affair.

== Transport ==
The nearby town of Nantybwch is a 44-minute walk (2 miles (3.2 km)) from the village and is the location of bus services:

- 97 (Ebbw Vale-Peacehaven)
- 20 (Tredegar to Rhymney)

Rhymney railway station is 60 minutes from the village by bus from Nantybwch. Nantybwch is the historic site of the now closed Nantybwch railway station.

== Politics ==
The village is represented under the ward of Sirhowy and its councillors are Brian Thomas (Ind, Sirhowy), Malcolm Cross (Lab, Sirhowy), and Tommy Smith (Lab, Sirhowy).

The area is represented in the Senedd by Alun Davies (Labour) and the Member of Parliament is Nick Smith (Labour).
