= Tonstein =

Type of sedimentary rock

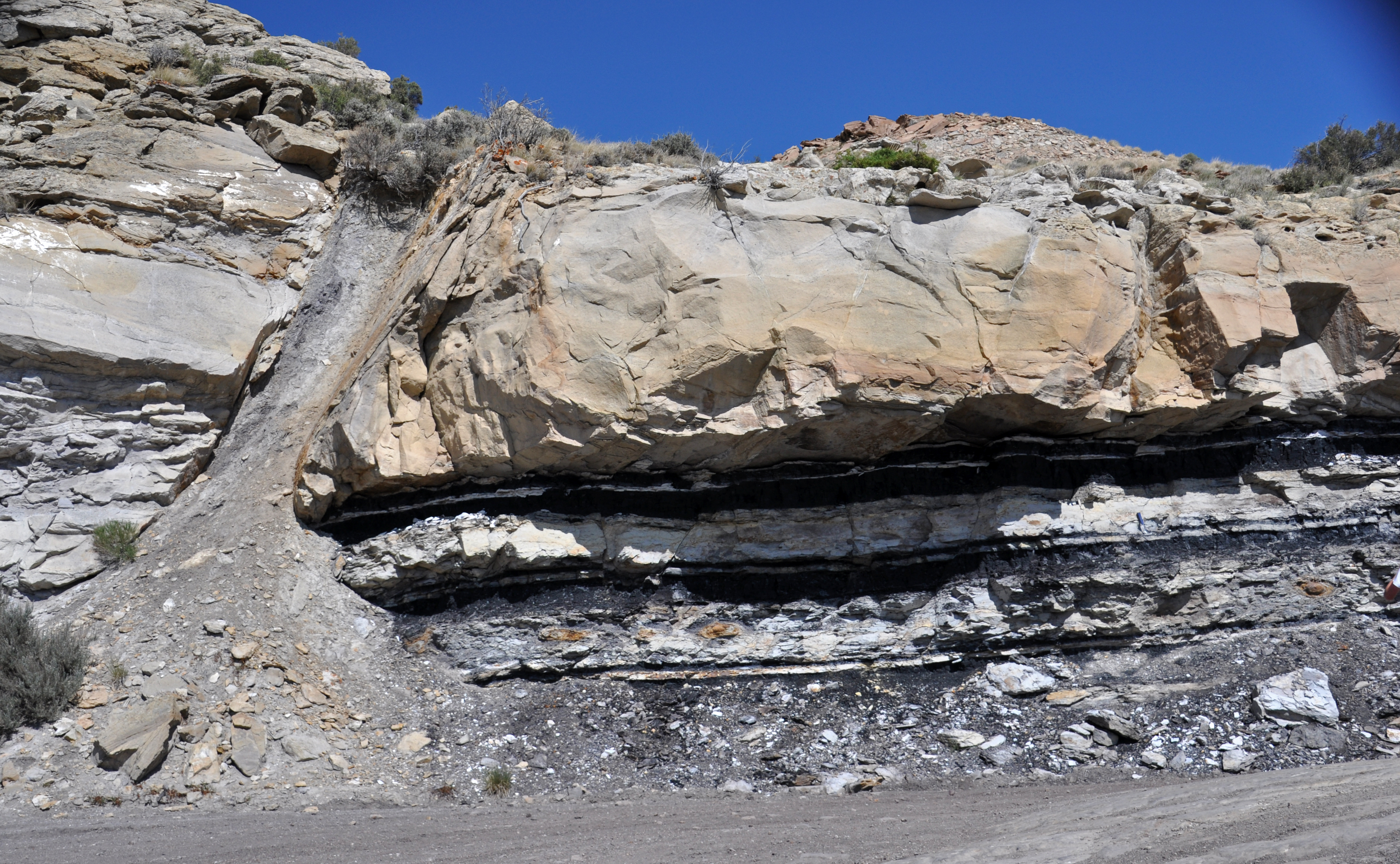
Sandstone-coal tonsteins in Wyoming

Tonstein (from the German "Ton", meaning clay, plus "Stein", meaning stone) is a hard, compact sedimentary rock that is composed mainly of kaolinite or, less commonly, other clay minerals such as montmorillonite and illite. The clays often are cemented by iron oxide minerals, carbonaceous matter, or chlorite. Tonsteins form from volcanic ash deposited in swamps. Tonsteins occur as distinctive, thin, and laterally extensive layers in coal seams throughout the world. They are often used as key beds to correlate the strata in which they are found. The regional persistence of tonsteins and relict phenocrysts indicate that they formed as the result of the diagenetic alteration of volcanic ash falls in an acidic (low pH) and low-salinity environment, consistent with a freshwater swamp. In contrast, the alteration of a volcanic ashfall deposit in a marine environment typically produces a bentonite layer.

The induration of tonsteins is in contrast to kaolin claystones that can be mined for kaolin clay, such as the ball clays found at Bovey Tracey which formed by the erosion of a nearby kaolinised granite. These deposits are generally softer, white, and plastic.

== See also ==
- Claystone – Clastic sedimentary rock composed primarily of clay-sized particles
- Lutite – Old terminology for clayey sedimentary rock
- Mudstone – Fine grained sedimentary rock whose original constituents were clays or muds
- Pelite – Metamorphic rock
- Shale – Fine-grained, clastic sedimentary rock
