= Marros-Pendine Coast =

Protected area in Carmarthenshire, Wales

Marros-Pendine Coast is a Site of Special Scientific Interest in Carmarthen & Dinefwr, Wales. It includes Marros Sands, Morfabychan beach and part of Pendine Sands and some of the cliffs and slopes above them. The SSSI was designated in 1988 and has an area of 2.5 km^{2}.

== See also ==
- List of Sites of Special Scientific Interest in Carmarthen & Dinefwr
