= Tair Carn Uchaf =

Hill in Carmarthenshire, Wales

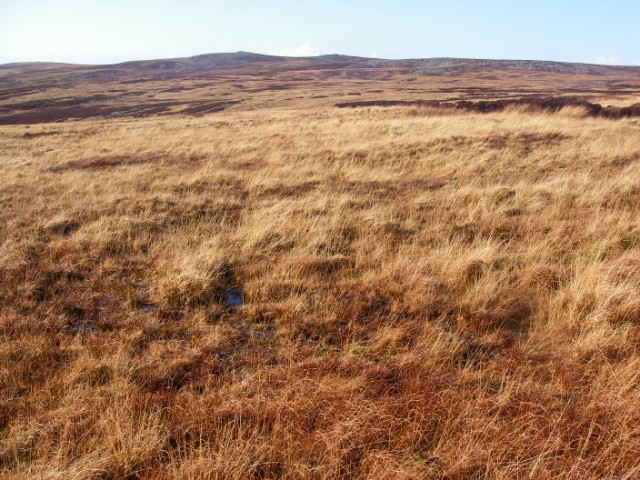
Eastern slopes of Tair Carn Uchaf

Tair Carn Uchaf (Welsh for 'Upper Three Cairns') is a hill in the Brecon Beacons National Park (Welsh: Parc Cenedlaethol Bannau Brycheiniog) in the county of Carmarthenshire, Wales. Its summit sits atop a plateau-like ridge at 482 metres (1,580 ft) above sea level and is marked by one of the three huge cairns which give the mountain its name.

The main ridge leads southwest towards the subsidiary top of Tair Carn Isaf ("Lower Three Cairns", 51.8344°N 3.9113°W), which hosts further cairns. The summit of this top lies at 460 metres (1,510 ft), whilst a trig point just to its southwest lies at a height of 459 metres (1,506 ft). To the south of the main ridge lies the subsidiary peak of Drysgol which reaches a height of 393 metres (1,290 ft).

== Geology and drainage ==
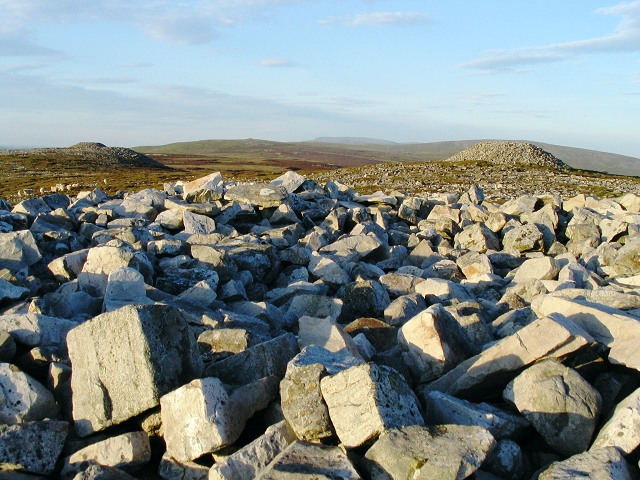
Cairns on the summit of Tair Carn Uchaf

To the south is the Amman Valley into which flow the streams of Nant Pedol and Nant-y-ffin or Berach whilst the Nant Gwythwch drains westwards into the River Loughor. Rainwater falling on the hill's northern slopes is likely to spend part of its journey underground on account of the band of Carboniferous Limestone which sweeps across this area from east to west. Northward drainage is ultimately into the River Loughor and Afon Cennen.

The summit plateau is formed from blocks of the Twrch Sandstone (formerly the 'Basal Grit') of the Marros Group (former 'Millstone Grit Series') deposited during the Carboniferous period. Whilst the general dip of the rock strata is to the south, there are areas which have foundered due to the presence of the soluble limestone not far beneath the surface.

== Access ==
The hill is open country so walkers can roam across it at will. There are public footpaths along its southern margin and a long bridleway crosses the moors to the east of the hill. two minor roads cross its western flanks. The Beacons Way route from Llangadog to Abergavenny runs along the northern flanks of Tair Carn Uchaf.
