= Marros Sands =

Beach in Carmarthenshire, Wales

Coordinates: 51°44′14″N 4°36′00″W

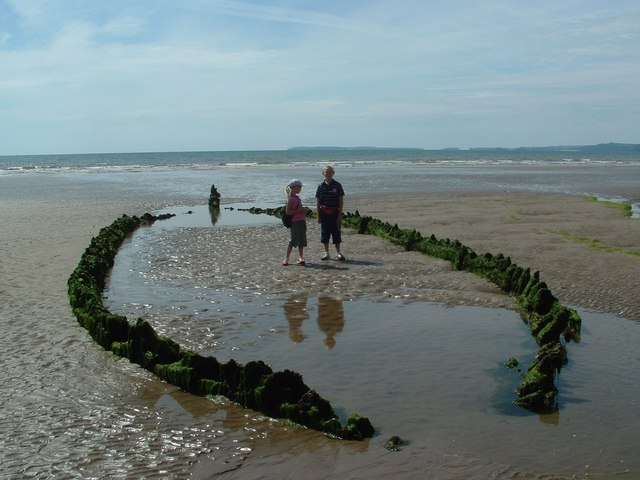
Wreckage of Rover on Marros Sands in 2007.

Marros Sands is a beach in Carmarthenshire between Amroth and Pendine and to the south of the small settlement of Marros.

The beach is separated from Amroth beach to the west by Telpyn Point and from Morfabychan beach to the east by Ragwen Point. The land to the north of the beach is formed from cliffs and hillside that slopes steeply up towards Marros Beacon. There are caves towards the western end.

The beach is mostly a storm bank of stones and gravel above Mean High Water with a large mostly sandy beach appearing when the tide is lower. It was described in 1844 as "a fine sandy beach, a few miles in length, and well-adapted for sea-bathing from the shallowness of the water for a considerable distance from the shore" and more recently as "relatively unspoilt" when compared to the tourist honeypots nearby.

An area of submerged alder, oak and willow forest 100 m wide and 2 km long and dating from 4000/6000 years ago can be seen at low tides. It was particularly visible in 1976. Flint knapping remains have been found on the beach and on Top Castle on Marros Beacon above the beach. Historically blue clay and other materials were extracted from the beach. The cliffs at Marros Beach give their name to rocks of the Marros Group.

On 8 December 1886 Rover a 71 ft schooner carrying a cargo of culm from Saundersfoot to Wexford was deliberately beached on Marros Sands in a Force 11 gale to avoid sinking. Its wreckage was further exposed by the storms of early 2014 and subsequently surveyed. Due to its seclusion and quietness the beach is sometimes used by naturists.

Along with Pendine Sands the beach forms part of the Marros-Pendine Coast Site of Special Scientific Interest.
