= Bristol Coalfield =

Coalfield in west England

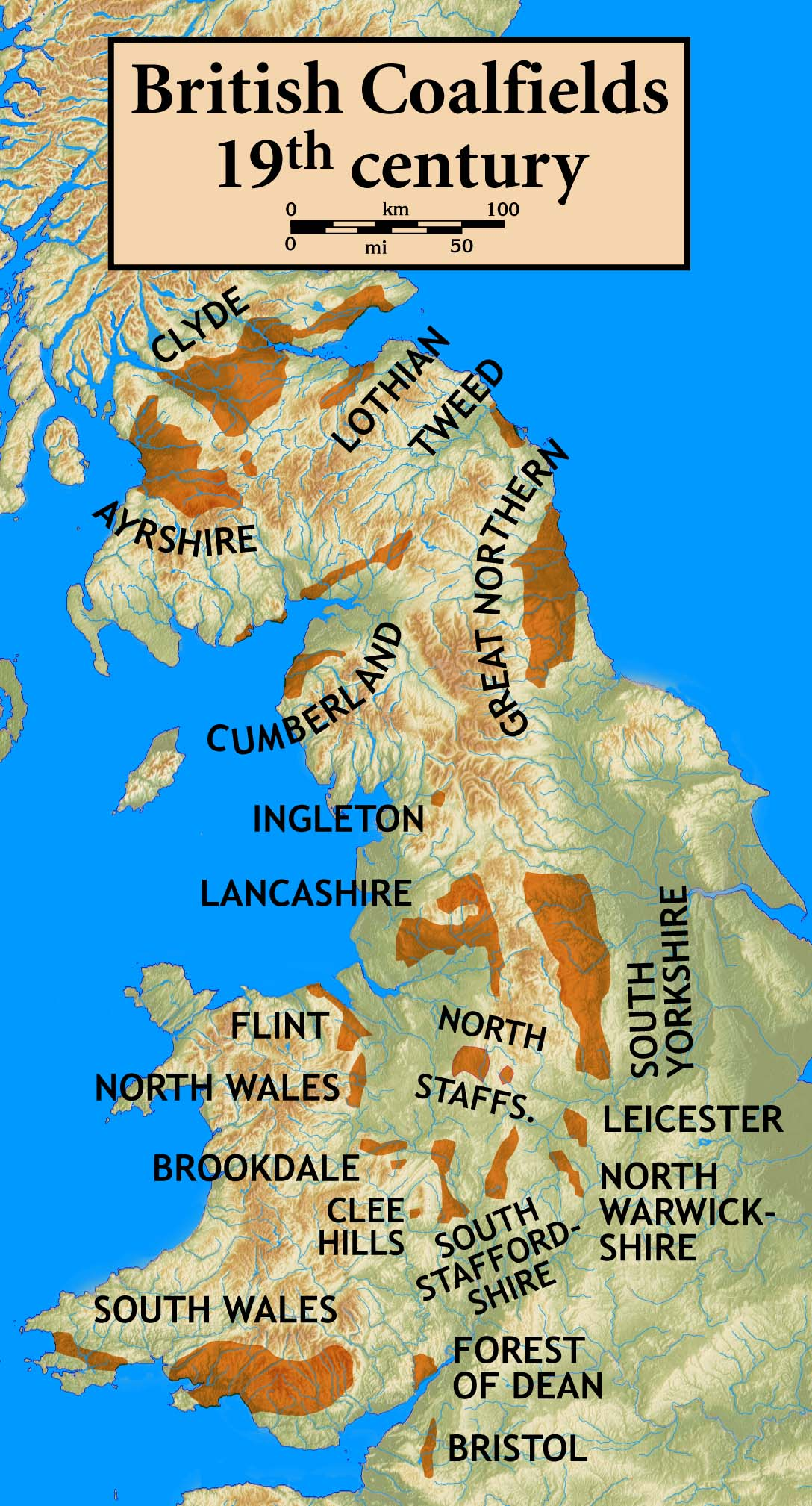

The Bristol Coalfield is a geologically complex coalfield in the west of England. Comprising the coal-bearing rocks arranged around the Coalpit Heath Syncline and Kingsdown Anticline, it extends beneath the eastern parts of the city of Bristol and northwards through southern Gloucestershire. The coalfield is sometimes referred to together with the Somerset Coalfield, which lies to its south, as the Bristol and Somerset Coalfield. There are also two outlying coal-mining areas, the Severn Coalfield and the Nailsea Basin which are described below.

Several coal seams are named in the sequence in the Bristol Coalfield. The seams are listed stratigraphically with the uppermost (youngest) at the head of the list and the lowermost (oldest) at the foot. Not all seams are named, nor are all seams present at any one location.

Upper Coal Measures
- Pensford No 1
- Pensford No 2
- Pensford No 3
- Bromley No 4
- Bromley No 5
- Rock Vein of Brislington
- Salridge
- Mangotsfield (?Salridge)
- Stinking
- Corston
- Cock (?=Millgrit & Rag)
- Coke
- Chick (?=Buff)
- Hen (?=Parrot)
- Coking

Lower and Middle Coal Measures
- New Smith's (?Yate Little, Warmley)
- ?Yate Hard
- Lower Five
- Kingswood & Bedminster Great
- Giller Inn
- Kingswood Little
- Soundwell Hard Venture
- Ashton Great
- Ashton Little

== Mining the Bristol Coalfield ==
Coal mining in Bristol was first recorded in the 13th century, when licences were issued to dig for coal in Kingswood Chase. By the late 17th century coal mining in the area had grown substantially, supplying cheap coal to the city and its fuel-intensive industries.

In 1793, William Matthew's reported in his history and directory of Bristol that:

"The advantages arising to the inhabitants from having plenty of coal so near to the City are very great, as well from its use to families who burn it profusely, and to poor people who are rendered warm and comfortable by it, in the winter, as to the various manufactories of glass, sugar, spirits, iron and brass, in which there is a great consumption of it. There are pits all around the City, in Gloucestershire at Kingswood; and in Somerset, at Bedminster, Ashton, Nailsea and Brislington. But the most copious supply is from Kingswood, in which there are a great number of pits and colliers houses, which last are so frequent and numerous, that Kingswood has from the neighbouring hills the appearance of being one vast, rural suburb of Bristol. There are several pits within half a mile of the Town, at Upper and Lower Easton and near Lawrence-hill. To those that choose to fetch their coals from pit, they are sold there at 3d a bushel for large, and 2d a bushel for small. They are brought to Bristol in Wagons, carts and on horses, and are sold to the inhabitants at 14d the sack which holds two bushels and a half."

By 1854 the Bristol coalfield was producing 1,050,000 tons per year from seventeen major pits. However, the industry declined from this time, with employment in the Bristol district shrinking from 3,500 men in the 1870s to less than 500 by the late 1930s. This was despite the fact that the late 19th century and early 20th century was a period in which coal production in Britain as a whole increased substantially. The last Bristol colliery closed in 1963.

== Severn Coalfield ==
Within the Upper Coal Measures of the outlying 'Avonmouth Basin' are the Avonmouth No 1 and No 2 coals. This is sometimes known as the Severn Coalfield. It lies several miles to the west of the main Bristol Coalfield and extends under the Severn Estuary as far as Portskewett. It is also largely obscured by thick deposits of estuarine alluvium. Coal was also worked on a very small scale in the rocks of the Clapton-in-Gordano inlier just to the south of the Severn Coalfield.

== Nailsea Basin ==
In the small 'Nailsea Basin' 7 miles (11 km) to the west of Bristol, a sequence of Coal Measures rocks are preserved within a syncline. These rocks are connected at depth with those of the Somerset Coalfield; though it lies close to the main body of the Bristol Coalfield, it is not connected with it. Two seams are known from the upper Coal Measures and twelve from the Lower and Middle Coal Measures within this 'basin'. Only those indicated thus - w - were worked to any great extent:

Upper Coal Measures
- Grace's (0.9m) w
Lower and Middle Coal Measures
- White's Top (1.1m) w
- Golden Valley
- Backwell Little
- Dog (0.9m) w

== See also ==
- Bristol Miners' Association
