= Millstone Grit =

Type of sandstone in the British Isles

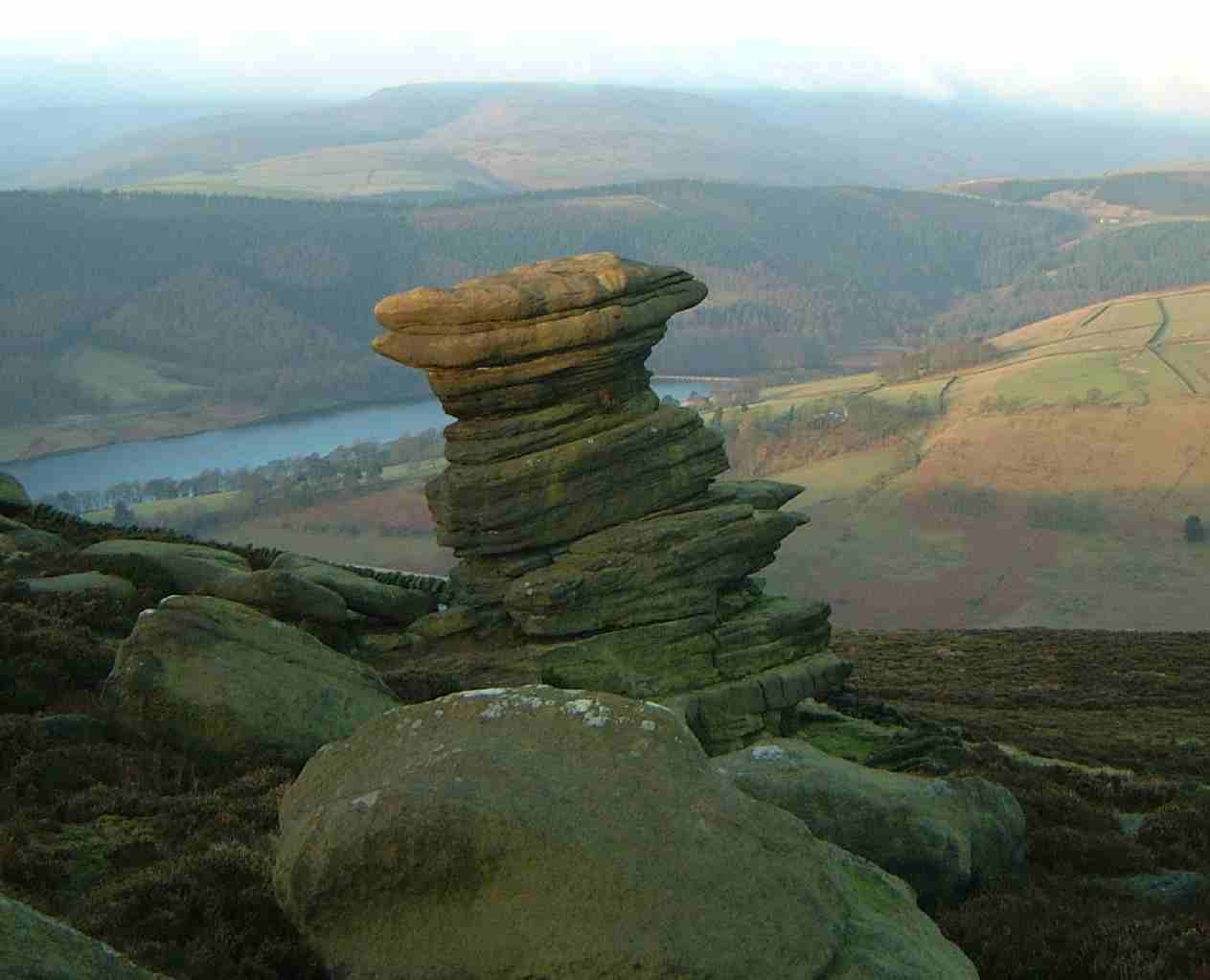
The Salt Cellar, a gritstone tor on Derwent Edge in the Peak District, England

Millstone Grit is any of a number of coarse-grained sandstones of Carboniferous age which occur in the British Isles. The name derives from its use in earlier times as a source of millstones for use principally in watermills. Geologists refer to the whole suite of rocks that encompass the individual limestone beds and the intervening mudstones as the Millstone Grit Group. The term Millstone Grit Series was formerly used to refer to the rocks now included within the Millstone Grit Group together with the underlying Edale Shale Group.

The term gritstone describes any sandstone composed of coarse angular grains, and specifically refers to such sandstones within the Pennines and neighbouring areas of Northern England.

== Geographical occurrence ==
Rocks assigned to the Millstone Grit Group occur over a wide area of Northern England, where they are a hugely important landscape-forming element of the rock succession. They also occur in parts of northeast Wales and northwest Ireland. The group comprises a succession of sandstones, mudstones and siltstones, the specifics of the sequence varying from one area to another. They give rise both to a number of escarpments, known locally as edges, and a series of high plateaux throughout the region, many of which are of considerable cultural significance.

=== Pennines ===
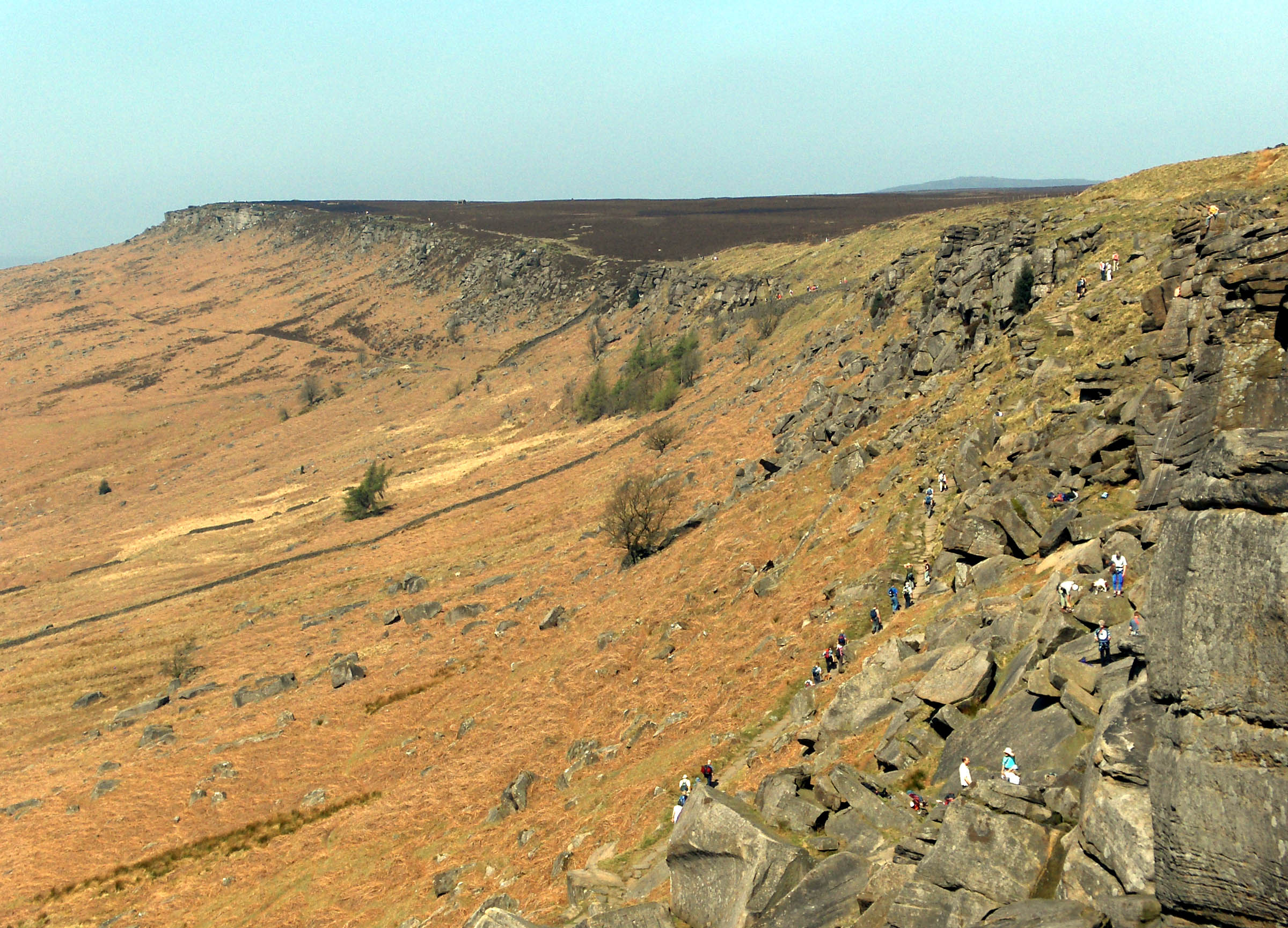
Stanage Edge in the eastern Peak district

They are the major landscape-forming rocks of the northern part of the Peak District (the Dark Peak) and of its eastern and western flanks in the counties of Derbyshire, Staffordshire and Cheshire. The great expanses of moorland around Bleaklow and Black Hill and fringed with broken outcrops of gritstone are characteristic of the area.

The ‘eastern edges of the Peak District’ comprise a broadly north-south arranged series of west-facing cliffs from Bamford Edge in the north through Stanage Edge, Burbage Edge, Froggatt Edge, Curbar Edge, Baslow Edge, Gardom's Edge, Birchen Edge, Dobb/Chatsworth Edge, Harland Edge and Fallinge Edge in the south. To the east of these edges is a broad band of relatively flat moorland known as the Eastern Moors.

Towards the western margins of the Peak District are a rather more broken series of edges, facing in a variety of directions, from those surrounding the high plateaux of Kinder Scout and Combs Moss to the imposing crags of the Roaches, Hen Cloud and Ramshaw Rocks in the south.

A millstone shaped from Millstone Grit quarried in the area has been adopted as the emblem of the Peak District National Park. As an image, the millstone is widely visible on literature but use is made of the objects themselves at many of the entrances to the National Park.

These rocks extend northwards through the South Pennines of Lancashire and West Yorkshire and westwards into the Forest of Rossendale and West Pennines and the Forest of Bowland, also in Lancashire. At the Yorkshire Dales they cover the south-east edge, but north of the Craven Faults, due to weathering, they form only cappings to separate hills.

=== Northeast Wales ===
A small area of Millstone Grit Group rocks stretches through Flintshire and Wrexham into the northwest corner of Shropshire near Oswestry.

=== South Wales ===
The term "Millstone Grit" was also adopted in South Wales where rocks of similar age and lithology are found though the Millstone Grit Series of this region has recently been formally renamed by the British Geological Survey as the Marros Group. The thickest bed of sandstone within it was known as the Basal Grit and this has now been renamed as the Twrch Sandstone. The Farewell Rock was formerly considered to be the uppermost unit of the Millstone Grit series of South Wales though it is now included within the overlying South Wales Coal Measures.

=== Ireland ===
The term has also been adopted at Slieve Anierin in northwest Ireland, describing the series of shales, grits, and coal seams, occurring from the base of the Namurian upwards.

== Origins ==
The Millstone Grit dates to the Namurian Stage of the Carboniferous Period. At this time a series of isolated uplands existed across the British Isles region. One particular east-west aligned landmass stretched from Wales through the English Midlands and East Anglia to the continent and is now known as the Wales-Brabant High, though was formerly referred to as St George's Land. Other uplands the erosion of which would provide the source material for the Millstone Grit lay to the north and northeast of the region. The Pennine Basin received input of sand and mud largely from southerly directed rivers from these northern landmasses.

Rivers running north off the Wales-Brabant High deposited material in the southern parts of the Pennine basin from northeast Wales to the Peak District. Southerly flowing rivers from this same landmass were responsible for the Millstone Grit/Marros Group succession in South Wales.

During much of the Carboniferous Period, world sea-levels were fluctuating in response to the growth and decline of a series of major ice-caps over the continents then clustered around the South Pole. Britain lay in the equatorial region. At times of high sea-level, silt and mud accumulated within the Pennine basin whilst at times of low sea-level, major deltas prograded across the region, their legacy being the thick sandstone beds of the Millstone Grit Group.

== Stratigraphy ==
The Millstone Grit Group comprises over thirty individually named sandstones, some of regional extent, others more local in their occurrence. The intervening mudstones and siltstones are not generally named though important marine bands within them are named.

The oldest, and hence lowermost in the succession is the thick Pendle Grit of central Lancashire. It is succeeded by the sandstone known variously as the Brennand Grit, Warley Wise Grit and Grassington Grit. These are all of Pendleian (E1) age – the lowermost sub-stage of the Namurian.

The Lower Follifoot Grit, Silver Hills Sandstone, Nottage Crag Grit, Marchup Grit, Red Scar Grit, Ward’s Stone Sandstone, Cocklett Scar Sandstones and Dure Clough Sandstones are all assigned to the following Arnsbergian sub-stage. The Kinderscoutian includes the Kinder Grit, Longnor Sandstones, Shale Grit, Todmorden Grit, Parsonage Sandstone, Heysham Harbour Sandstone, Eldroth Grit and Ellel Crag Sandstone.

The next sub-stage of the Namurian succession is the Marsdenian and it is to this that the Chatsworth Grit, Huddersfield White Rock, Holcombe Brook Grit, Greta Grits, Roaches Grit, Ashover Grit, Gorpley Grit, Pule Hill Grit, Fletcher Bank Grit, Brooksbottom Grit, Five Clouds Sandstones and Sheen Sandstones are assigned.

The closing sub-stage of the Namurian, the Yeadonian includes the Lower Haslingden Flags and the last sandstone in the entire Millstone Grit succession known as the Rough Rock. It is a widespread unit which attains a thickness of around 45m though is more generally 15m thick.

== Economic importance ==
Various of the sandstone beds of the Millstone Grit have been quarried for building stone, paving flags and roofing material. Its use in the construction of dry stone walls across the areas where it outcrops is considerable. In neighbouring limestone areas, gritstone has often been preferred in the past for use as gateposts and lintels. The very name of the rock derives from its widespread use within cornmills where it proved suitable for grinding stones. It also found agricultural use as drinking troughs for animals. The majority of the quarrying for such use took place along the eastern edges of the Peak District. Millstone Edge was a significant source whilst abandoned millstones can be seen below the edges at Stanage, Froggatt and Baslow. Bramley Fall stone is a notable type of Millstone Grit sourced from around the village of Bramley, near Leeds.

Some of the sandstones serve as aquifers into which numerous wells and boreholes have been sunk to provide local water supplies.

Crushed gritstone is also used as aggregate in path and road construction.

== Rock climbing ==
The gritstone edges of West Yorkshire and the Peak District provide one of the classic areas in Britain for rock climbing. Public access to these edges for climbing developed at much the same time as access for walkers to the moors of the Pennines was established during the first half of the twentieth century. Their proximity to large centres of population resulted in their rapid development as climbing venues.
