= Coal measures =

Coal-bearing geological strata

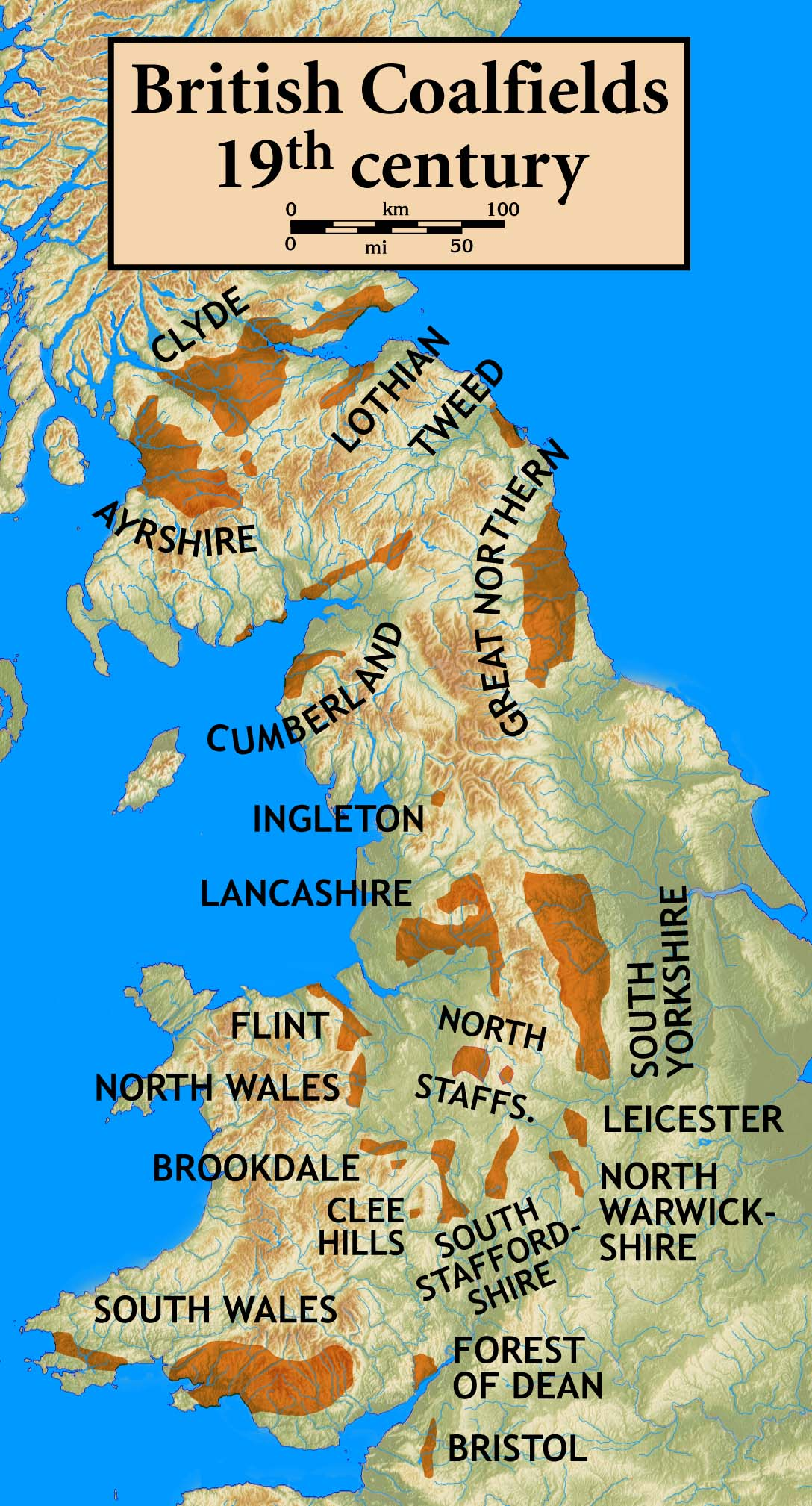
British coalfields in the 19th century

In lithostratigraphy, coal measures are coal-bearing strata, with the term typically applied to European units of the Upper Carboniferous System.

In the United Kingdom, the term is equivalent to regional components of the Westphalian-age Coal Measures Group. The group records the deposition of fluvio-deltaic sediments which consists mainly of clastic rocks (claystones, shales, siltstones, sandstones, conglomerates) interstratified with the beds of coal. In most places, the coal measures are underlain by coarser clastic sequences known as Millstone Grit, of Namurian age. The top of the coal measures may be marked by an unconformity, the overlying rocks being Permian or later in age. In some parts of Britain, however, the coal measures grade up into mainly coal-barren red beds of late Westphalian and possibly Stephanian age. Within the Pennine Basin, these barren measures are now referred to as the Warwickshire Group, from the district where they achieve their thickest development.

The coal measures formed during Westphalian and earliest Stephanian times in the European ('Heerlen') chronostratigraphical scheme (which is approximately equivalent to the Middle Pennsylvanian Series of the IUGS global chronostratigraphical scheme).

== Informal usage for other coal-bearing strata ==
In the eastern United States the term coal measures has been applied to the Pennsylvanian coal fields. Generally, the Pittsburgh coal seam is considered the base of the upper coal measures, exposed along the Monongahela River, while the lower coal measures are exposed along the Allegheny River.

The term coal measures has also historically been used in other parts of the world for coal-bearing successions of various ages, e.g. the Permian coal measures of Australia and the late Cretaceous and early Tertiary coal measures found in New Zealand. However, these usages are mostly informal.

== See also ==
- Walloon Coal Measures, Late Jurassic geologic formation in Queensland, Australia
- Illawarra Coal Measures, group of sedimentary rocks occurring in the Sydney Basin in eastern Australia
- Cattamarra Coal Measures, Jurassic geological part of the Perth Basin, Western Australia
- Pennine Coal Measures Group, Pennine coal-bearing succession of rock strata in the United Kingdom
- Warwickshire Coalfield, Lower and Middle Coal Measures principal coal seams (in stratigraphic order i.e. youngest/uppermost first)
- Coal Measures Group, the coal-bearing succession of rock strata which occur in the United Kingdom
- Lancashire Coal Measures, coalfield consisting of the coal seams of the Upper, Middle and Lower Coal Measures
- South Wales Coal Measures Group
