= Warwickshire Group =

Geological group in Great Britain

The Warwickshire Group is a lithostratigraphic unit of rock strata defined within the British Carboniferous system. Within the Pennine Basin it overlies (i.e. postdates) the Coal Measures Group and is deemed to be of late Westphalian and Stephanian age. In the South Wales Coalfield it consists of the Pennant Sandstone Formation and overlying Grovesend Formation. It contains the youngest Carboniferous rocks in Britain. The name Warwickshire Group is a relatively recent one, replacing a variety of earlier names for the succession of coal-barren red-beds such as Barren Coal Measures and Red Measures which overlie the productive coal measures. It is derived from the Warwickshire Coalfield where they achieve their thickest development.
