= Stratigraphic unit =

Volume of rock

A stratigraphic unit is a volume of rock of identifiable origin and relative age range that is defined by the distinctive and dominant, easily mapped and recognizable petrographic, lithologic or paleontologic features (facies) that characterize it.

Units must be mappable and distinct from one another, but the contact need not be particularly distinct. For instance, a unit may be defined by terms such as "when the sandstone component exceeds 75%".

== Lithostratigraphic units ==
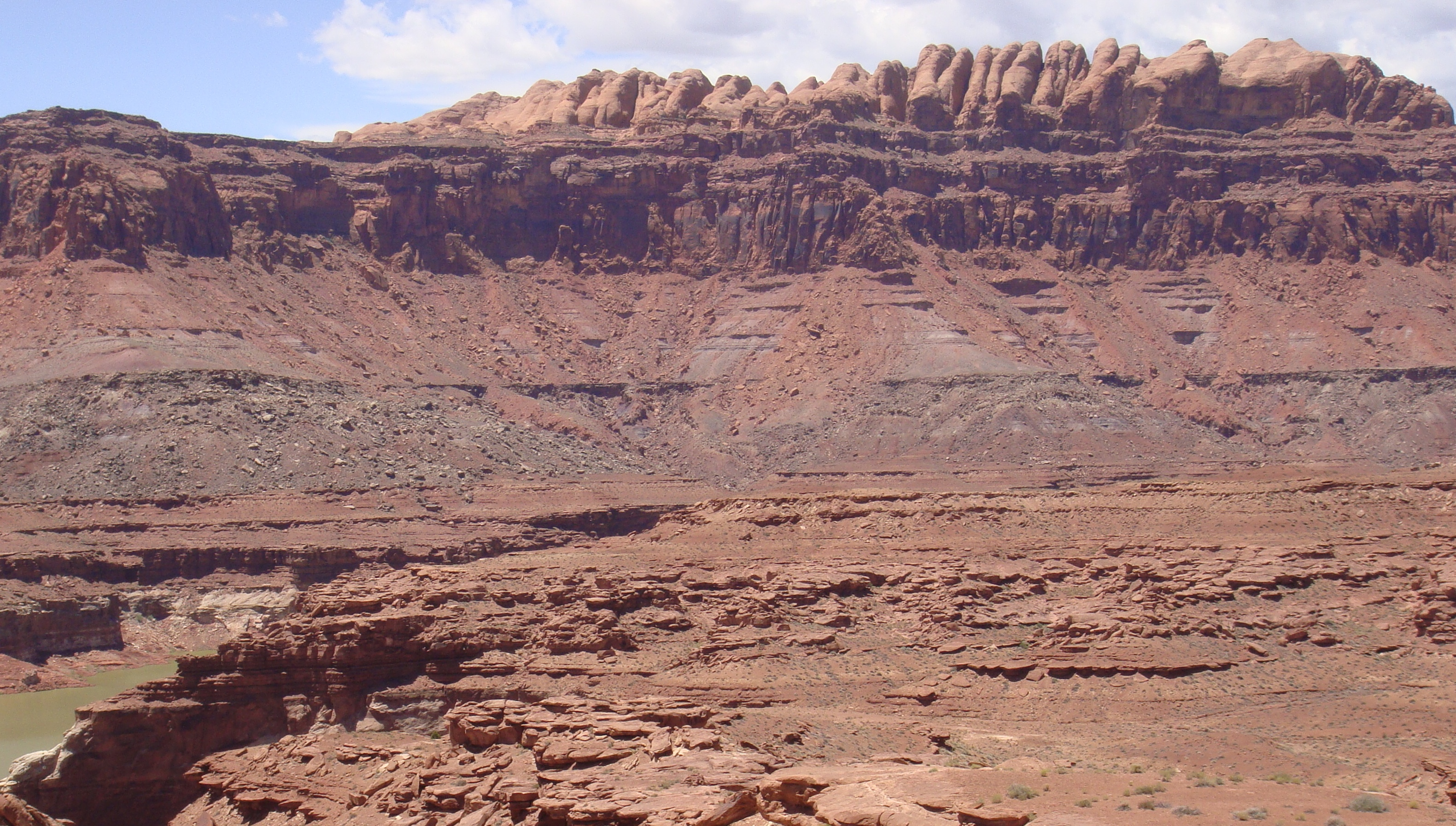
The Permian through Jurassic strata of the Colorado Plateau area of southeastern Utah demonstrate the principles of stratigraphy. These strata make up much of the famous prominent rock formations in widely spaced protected areas such as Capitol Reef National Park and Canyonlands National Park. From top to bottom: Rounded tan domes of the Navajo Sandstone, layered red Kayenta Formation, cliff-forming, vertically jointed, red Wingate Sandstone, slope-forming, purplish Chinle Formation, layered, lighter-red Moenkopi Formation, and white, layered Cutler Formation sandstone. Picture from Glen Canyon National Recreation Area, Utah.

Sequences of sedimentary and volcanic rocks are subdivided on the basis of their shared or associated lithology. Formally identified lithostratigraphic units are structured in a hierarchy of lithostratigraphic rank, higher rank units generally comprising two or more units of lower rank. Going from smaller to larger in rank, the main lithostratigraphic ranks are bed, member, formation, group and supergroup.

Formal names of lithostratigraphic units are assigned by geological surveys. Units of formation or higher rank are usually named for the unit's type location, and the formal name usually also states the unit's rank or lithology. A lithostratigraphic unit may have a change in rank over some distance; a group may thin to a formation in another region and a formation may reduce in rank for member or bed as it "pinches out".

=== Bed ===
A bed is a lithologically distinct layer within a member or formation and is the smallest recognisable stratigraphic unit. These are not normally named, but may be in the case of a marker horizon.

=== Member ===
A member is a named lithologically distinct part of a formation. Not all formations are subdivided in this way and even where they are recognized, they may only form part of the formation. A member need not be mappable at the same scale as a formation.

=== Formation ===
Formations are the primary units used in the subdivision of a sequence and may vary in scale from tens of centimetres to kilometres. They should be distinct lithologically from other formations, although the boundaries do not need to be sharp. To be formally recognised, a formation must have sufficient extent to be useful in mapping an area.

=== Group ===
A group is a set of two or more formations that share certain lithological characteristics. A group may be made up of different formations in different geographical areas and individual formations may appear in more than one group. Groups are occasionally divided into subgroups, but subgroups are not mentioned in the North American Stratigraphic Code, and are permitted under International Commission on Stratigraphy guidelines only in exceptional circumstances.

=== Supergroup ===
A supergroup is a set of two or more associated groups and/or formations that share certain lithological characteristics. A supergroup may be made up of different groups in different geographical areas.

== Biostratigraphic units ==
A sequence of fossil-bearing sedimentary rocks can be subdivided on the basis of the occurrence of particular fossil taxa. A unit defined in this way is known as a biostratigraphic unit, generally shortened to biozone. The five commonly used types of biozone are assemblage, range, abundance, interval and lineage zones.

- An assemblage zone is a stratigraphic interval characterised by an assemblage of three or more coexisting fossil taxa that distinguish it from surrounding strata.
- A range zone is a stratigraphic interval that represents the occurrence range of a specific fossil taxon, based on the localities where it has been recognised.
- An abundance zone is a stratigraphic interval in which the abundance of a particular taxon (or group of taxa) is significantly greater than seen in neighbouring parts of the succession.
- An interval zone is a stratigraphic interval whose top and base are defined by horizons that mark the first or last occurrence of two different taxa.
- A lineage zone is a stratigraphic interval that contains fossils that represent parts of the evolutionary lineage of a particular fossil group. This is a special case of a range zone.

== See also ==
- Chronostratigraphy
- Glaciology
- Magnetostratigraphy
- Sedimentology
- Sequence stratigraphy
- Stratigraphy
