= Anglesey Coalfield =

Mine on Anglesey, Wales, UK

Coordinates: 53.21608°N 4.32398°W

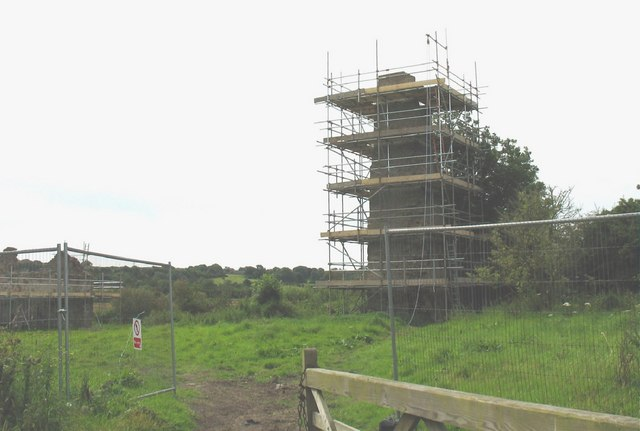
Renovation of the Berw Colliery buildings in 2007

The Anglesey Coalfield is a minor British coalfield. Although it is situated in north-west Wales, this isolated coalfield on Anglesey is not usually considered to form a part of the North Wales Coalfield which lies in Flintshire and Denbighshire in north-east Wales although both measures were formed during the Carboniferous period. Stretching from Nant and Hirdrefaig in the Pentre Berw area along Cors Ddyga ("Tygai's marsh") and under the sea at Malltraeth village which was called 'yr Iard' or 'Iard Malltraeth'. On the western side of the Afon Cefni lies Cors Malltraeth. It was named after Cwmwd Malltraeth (Commote) which was the old Welsh way of dividing the Isle of Mona by the Welsh Princes and the Church. Both coalfields measure around 9 miles long.

Working the coal on Cors Ddyga at such places as Nant, Tyddyn Mawr, Penrhyn Mawr, Gwaith Berw (New Berw Mine), Berw Uchaf and Tai Hirion took place during the coalfield's 300 year productive life from the fifteenth to the late nineteenth century. The work on and above Cors Malltraeth below Llangristiolus, Paradwys, Trefdraeth and under the bay at Malltraeth village progressed throughout the nineteenth century. During the early years of the twentieth century a committee was formed to reopen the coalfield at Llangristiolus but the middle class and farming gentry did not support the venture.
