= South Wales Coalfield =

Region of Wales rich in coal deposits

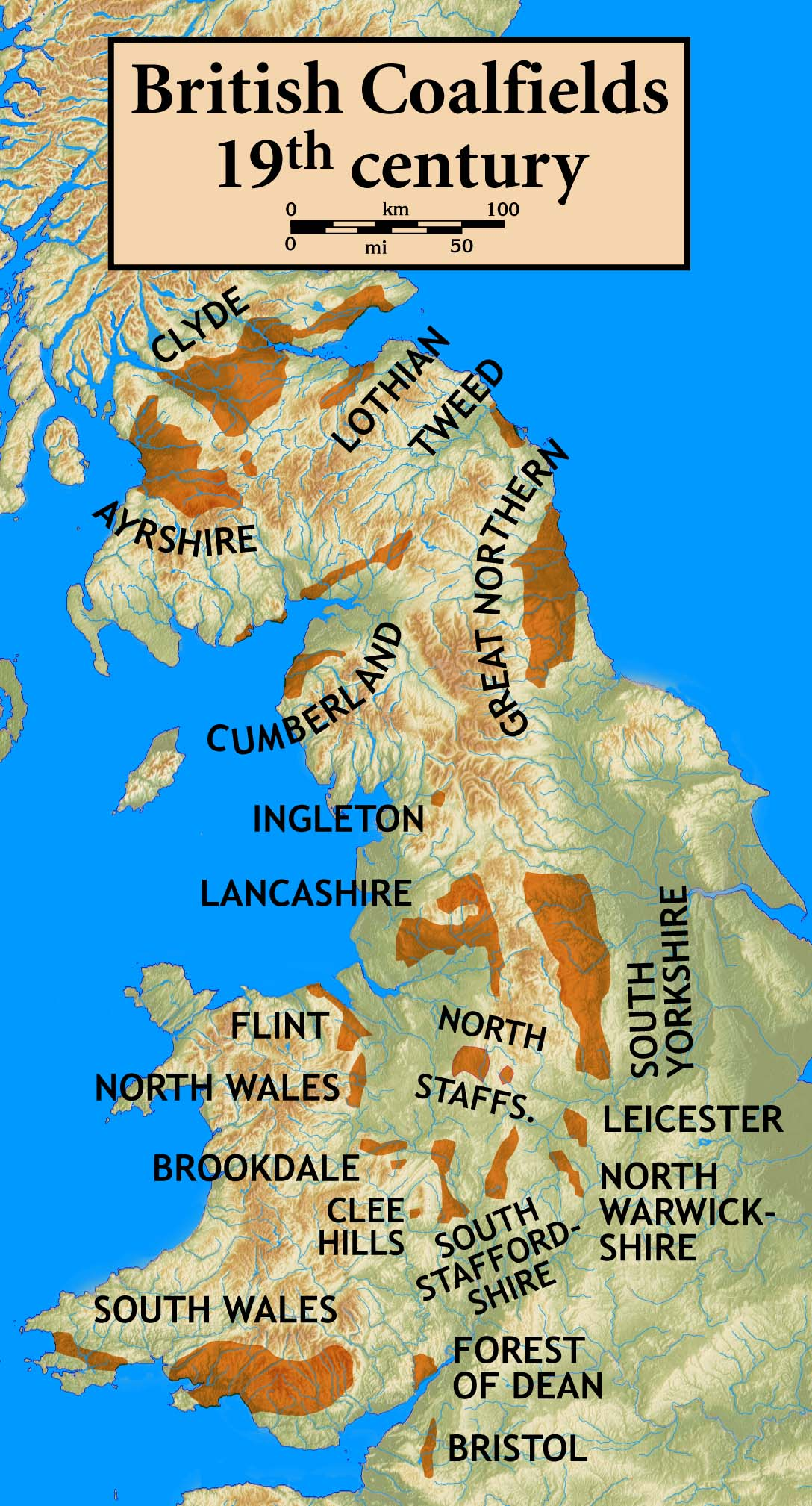
Map of British coalfields

The South Wales Coalfield (Welsh: Maes glo De Cymru) extends across Pembrokeshire, Carmarthenshire, Swansea, Neath Port Talbot, Bridgend, Rhondda Cynon Taf, Merthyr Tydfil, Caerphilly, Blaenau Gwent and Torfaen. It is rich in coal deposits, especially in the South Wales Valleys.

== Description ==
The area comprises a fully exposed synclinorium which gave rise to dramatic upland areas (Welsh: mynydd) rising to 300–600 m (980–1,970 ft) above sea level, and intersected by steep-sided valleys in which most of the area's deep mines were developed. The coal measures (Upper Carboniferous/Pennsylvanian) are thick, workable seams in the lower parts and generally thinner and sparser seams in the upper parts, with a development of sandstones (Pennant Sandstone) much used in local construction, (including the characteristic terraced houses).

The coal generally increases in grade or "rank" from east to west, with bituminous coals in the east, and anthracite in the west, mostly to the north and west of Neath. The Rhondda Valley was particularly known for steam coals which fuelled steamships of the 19th and early 20th centuries.

== History ==
=== Industrial and transport expansion ===
Ways along the valley floors provided the main routes for exporting coal south to ports and docks such as Newport Docks, Cardiff Docks and Barry Docks.

Early mining activity was mainly by levels or adits driven into coal seams from outcrops in the valley sides. Development of the coalfield proceeded very actively from about 1850, when deep mining became significant in the previously entirely rural Rhondda Valley. Coal was moved from mines on tramways to canals such as the Swansea Canal and Glamorganshire Canal. These were supplemented, and then superseded, by numerous competing railways which fed the docks at Swansea, Cardiff, Newport, Llanelli and Barry.

Later colliery shafts were sunk as deep as 800 yards (730 metres) in order to reach the thicker, better quality seams.

Iron ore was also extracted from the coal measures, principally from the north crop area (including Merthyr Tydfil and Blaenavon). The availability of coal and nearby limestone (as a flux) gave rise to a substantial local iron and steel industry which was perpetuated in the 20th century by the location of modern steelworks at Ebbw Vale, Newport and Cardiff and Port Talbot. These used imported iron ore.

=== Decline ===
Coal fuelling of Royal Navy ships was increasingly challenged from 1904 when strategists including Admiral "Jacky" Fisher and, later, Winston Churchill successfully argued for oil-firing of the steam engines in new ships. Oil, having higher energy density than coal, allowed larger and faster warships, and being easily piped, was easier to supply to ships at sea.

By the start of World War I, both the Queen Elizabeth-class and the Revenge-class battleships were partly oil-fired: oil was used mainly for both quick-start steaming, and sprayed on burning coal to extend their range. A number of cruiser and destroyer classes produced since 1904 also used oil. However, by the time of the Battle of Jutland in May/June 1916 still only a sixth of the Grand Fleet was oil-fired. Further, that summer the British suffered a number of losses of oil tankers, and had to instruct oil-fired ships to restrict their fuel consumption and hence speed. When the United States entered the war in April 1917, the British instructed the United States Navy to send only coal-fired ships to assist them. To assist the Royal Navy, from the outset of the war the Government and railway companies ran what were termed "Jellicoe Specials", high-speed coal carrying freight trains that ran from South Wales to north-east Scotland, and then by ship to Scapa Flow. Initially running to Dingwall, they then were also ran to Scrabster through Thurso. However, inadequate capacity in port and rail facilities at these locations meant that from January 1915, all naval ordnance (other than ammunition) and medical supplies were sent by rail to Aberdeen, and from mid-1915 Grangemouth. By the end of WWI, the Royal Navy had 33 dreadnoughts and 9 battle cruisers, with 10 and 2 respectively entirely oil fuelled.

However, after WWI, the move to oil-firing was quickly extended to other areas, including the railways, which was a key strategic factor in the economic hardship which struck the coalfield after the war. Coal workings were over-expanded in the late nineteenth century, and the Welsh coal owners had failed to invest in mechanisation. By the inter-war period the South Wales Coalfield had the lowest productivity, highest costs and smallest profits in Britain. Hardship continued through the 1926 general strike, the great depression of the 1930s, World War II and thereafter. The 1937 novel The Citadel and the 1939 novel How Green Was My Valley describe such hardship, as do the poems of Idris Davies the miner, teacher and poet of Rhymney.

New collieries, particularly in the western part of the coalfield where anthracite is found, were developed into the 1960s by the National Coal Board (for instance, Cynheidre Colliery No 1 shaft, at 798 yards (730 m) deep was sunk in 1954/6). Following the general collapse of the UK coal industry, most pits closed during the 1980s, with factors such as exhaustion of reserves and geological complexity adding to their problems. The last deep mine, at Tower Colliery on the north crop, ceased mining in January 2008. However, a few small licensed mines continue to work seams, mostly from outcrop, on the hillsides. Although some areas of the coalfield are effectively worked out, considerable reserves remain. However, the geological difficulties, which resulted in the closure of (for instance) Nantgarw colliery, make the cost of significant further extraction high. The coalfield experienced a late-stage development when opencast mining was commenced on a large scale, mostly on the gently-dipping north crop. In addition, old tips were reclaimed for their small coal content, which could be burned in power stations such as nearby Aberthaw. Most of the old sites have been filled and landscaped.

Following the Aberfan disaster of 1966, when a coal-tip slurry flow buried a school, mine-waste tips, which had been piled precariously on hilltops in many cases, were extensively regraded and reclaimed. This work continues. Landslipping of the steep valley slopes, and subsidence caused by the coal extraction, have also posed problems.

=== Minor revival ===
A subsidiary of Western Coal (which mainly operates in the British Columbia and West Virginia coalfields), Energybuild plc, worked a drift mine near the old Tower Colliery, the Aberpergwm Colliery, until production was suspended in July 2015. The mine produced high quality anthracite, and was sold primarily to Aberthaw power station and Port Talbot Steelworks and into the wholesale and retail sized coal markets. Energybuild also operates the Nant y Mynydd opencast coal site nearby.

== Sociology and demography of the South Wales Coalfield ==
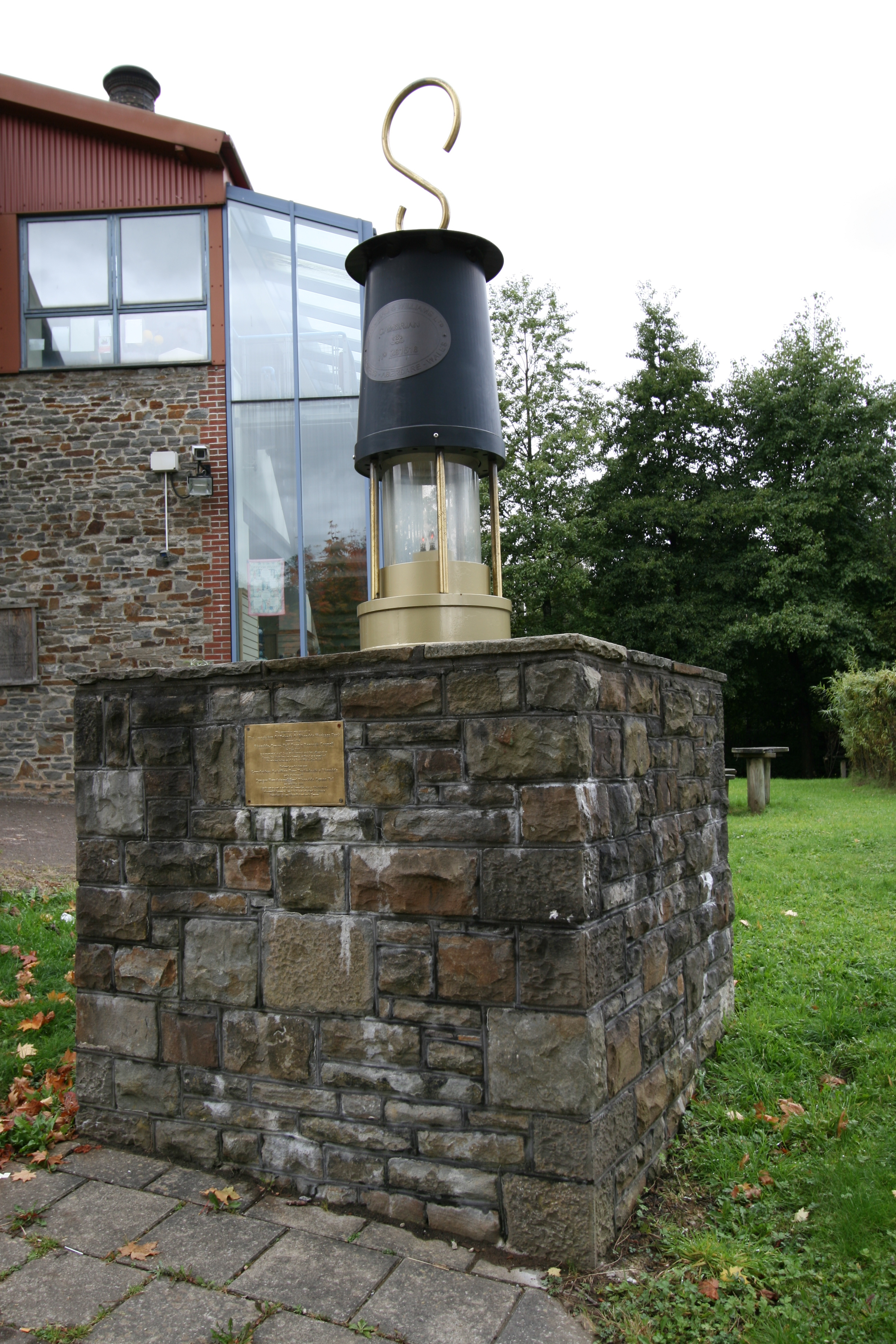
Mining memorial at Rhondda Heritage Park

=== Population change ===
As the mines and other industries rapidly expanded throughout the coalfield, nearby towns also expanded to meet the demand for labour. In the first half of the nineteenth century, the development of ironworks saw the population of Merthyr Tydfil, in the northern part of the coalfield, increase from 7,700 in 1801 to 49,794 in 1861, making it the largest town in Wales. As Cardiff and other ports in South Wales grew to meet the demands for exporting iron, steel and coal in the later part of the nineteenth century, valleys that had previously been sparsely inhabited suddenly increased in population. The Rhondda valley grew from less than a thousand people in 1851 to more than 150,000 in 1911.

Between 1881 and 1911, Glamorgan became the most industrialised part of Wales and saw inward migration of more than 330,000 people from elsewhere in Wales, neighbouring parts of England and further afield.

The coal mines were employing 250,000 men by 1921, but this was the peak and in subsequent decades the overseas market began to shrink. By 1930, employment in the mines was half of that in 1920 as mechanisation increased leading to a net loss of 314,000 people between 1921 and 1935.

=== Accidents and safety ===
The South Wales Coalfield was notorious for the number of fatal accidents in the 19th century.

==== Risca Black Vein accidents ====
The Risca Black Vein colliery had many fatal accidents to the extent that it became known as the "death pit".

The two biggest accidents at the Black Vein pit were in 1860, when 146 died, and in 1880 when 119 people died.

==== Prince of Wales disaster ====
The Prince of Wales colliery in Abercarn exploded in 1878 causing 268 deaths.

==== Llanerch Colliery disaster ====
The Llanerch Colliery in Abersychan exploded in 1890 causing 176 deaths.

==== Albion Colliery disaster ====
The Albion Colliery in Cilfynydd exploded in 1894 causing 276 deaths.

In the 20th century there were numerous further fatal accidents.

==== Universal Colliery disaster ====
The Universal Colliery in Senghenydd had Britain's worst mining accident when it exploded in 1913 killing 431.

==== Aberfan disaster ====
In 1966, 116 children and 28 adults were killed in Aberfan when a coal spoil tip collapsed onto them.

==== Gleision Colliery ====
On 15 September 2011, seven miners were working a narrow seam at the Gleision Colliery drift mine in the Tawe Valley, near Swansea, when a sudden ingress of water filled the passage in which they were working. Three miners were immediately able to escape to the surface. Despite extensive efforts to rescue the remaining miners, on 16 September South Wales Police confirmed that all four had died.

=== Miners' health ===
Coal mining in the South Wales Coalfield was a dangerous occupation with lifelong health implications.

Between 1849 and 1853, miners over the age of 25 in the Merthyr Tydfil district were found to have a life expectancy of around 20 years lower than in other mining areas of England and Wales.

In the 1930s, mine owners became concerned about the adverse health effects of coal dust and the amount it was costing them to compensate miners working at the coalface. Pneumoconiosis proved to be a particular problem for miners in South Wales, accounting for almost 90% of the total cases for the whole of the UK in both 1939 and 1945, and with more than 25% of the South Wales mining labour force affected between 1959 and 1963.

=== Women's roles ===
Women in South Wales were often not economically active in the second half of the nineteenth century due to the Mines and Collieries Act 1842 which restricted women from underground working. It has been suggested that this explains the lower marriage age and higher fertility of women in the coalfield.

== See also ==
- Coal mining in the United Kingdom
- 1926 United Kingdom general strike
- 1984–1985 United Kingdom miners' strike
- Miners' institute
- List of British coalfields
