= Marine band (geology) =

Bed of rock containing marine fossils

A marine band, in geology, is a bed of rock, commonly black or dark grey shale, containing an abundance of fossils of marine organisms. These strata represent episodes of flooding by seawater and are important in enabling the comparison or correlation of rock sequences in different localities.

== Examples ==
- Maltby Marine Band – England
- Milngavie Marine Band – Scotland
- Redhall Marine Band – Scotland

== See also ==
- Marine transgression
