= Pennine Basin =

The Pennine Basin is a sedimentary basin which was active during the Carboniferous Period and which reached from the Southern Uplands of Scotland in the north to the former Wales-London-Brabant Massif in the English Midlands to the south. Sediments deposited within the basin are now exposed at the surface throughout the Pennines but are also present beneath the surface over a much wider area of northern England and indeed into northeast Wales and just across the border into Scotland.

The basin was complex and consisted, at different times, of a variety of sub-basins separated by blocks across which typically sedimentation continued but resulted in much thinner rock sequences. The term, the 'Pennine Block-and-basin Province' is frequently used in literature to describe the situation which prevailed particularly during the lower Carboniferous.
