= Bedwas Navigation Colliery =

Coordinates: 51.5980°N 3.1872°W

Bedwas Navigation Colliery was a coal mine in the small Welsh village of Bedwas, two miles (3.2 km) north of Caerphilly. The colliery opened in 1913, and closed after the miners' strike of 1984-85.

== Development ==
In 1909 the Bedwas Colliery Company leased 1,475 acres of land, on the slopes of Mynydd y Grug just outside the village of Trethomas. As the best and easiest mineral rights had already been taken, Bedwas was forced to go deep, and called on the proven continental experience of Austrian Edmund L. Hann (cousin of meteorologist Julius von Hann), to design the colliery, having previously designed Penallta Colliery. To sink the shaft the company used the same experienced formula, engaging mining contractor Fred Piggott from Caerphilly (the former owner of a mansion that was The Caerphilly District Miners Hospital), to be responsible for the entire sinking.

Two shafts were sunk through the Mynyddislwyn seam, down to the Rhas Las (English - Black Vein) and thence, by a cross-measure, to the lowest coal seam then known in the Caerphilly area, the Hard Vein, known later as the Lower Black Vein. The two shafts (North and South) were 768 and 802 yards deep respectively (more than twice the height from ground to the roof of the Empire State Building), both with a diameter of 21 ft. Due to its depth, Bedwas was one of the first collieries in South Wales to employ double-deck winding to improve efficiency.

The purposeful insertion of the word "navigation" was undertaken to entice orders from marine shipping customers, including the Admiralty. The Royal Navy liked coal from Rhas Las, and hence many of the mines which extracted coal from this seam added "navigation" to their name.

== Operations ==
The first coal rose in 1912, which proved to be high quality steam coal.

Sir Samuel Instone, founder of Instone Air Line which would merge into Imperial Airways and later become part of British Airways, became the controlling shareholder in the colliery in 1921. By 1923, 2,578 men were producing half a million tonnes annually from the Black Vein, Lower Black Vein and Rock Vein seams.

However, due to the disturb nature of the geology at the depth it was forced to mine at, Bedwas was always beset by geological problems, and as a result made and lost money in cycles. In order to keep the mine profitable, the owners asked the men to take a 20% pay cut in the mid-1920s which led to the banning of the South Wales Miners' Federation (the main Trade Union), following riots. After a two-month stop in production, non-Unionised "scab" labour restarted production and by 1933 1,300 were employed; the SWMF was not recognised again by the owners until 1936 after a sit-in. By the outbreak of the World War II, 1,850 men produced 675,000 tons, which was its best ever figure.

On 1 January 1947, along with all other working collieries, Bedwas Navigation Colliery was Nationalised, controlled by the National Coal Board. In the late 1950s NCB approved a major £4 million reorganisation at the colliery, which: electrified the winding; provided a new pit bottom area; an underground loco roadway; a new coal preparation plant was built on the surface. During the mid-1970s circa 650 men were producing 230,000 tons of coal yearly from the Black and Meadow vein seams.

== Closure ==
Despite having claimed reserves equivalent to 60 years, by 1980 geological problems had restricted production to coming only from the Meadow Vein underneath Machen, and Big Vein. Most of this coal was transported by rail along the former Rumney Railway to the British Steel Corporation steel mill in Llanwern, while the residual was sent to the coking plant at Trethomas, adjacent to the colliery site, which had been leased to the British Benzol and Coal Distillation Co. Ltd, who had a coal by-products plant.

During the UK Miners' Strike of 1984/5, vital maintenance was not undertaken, and when the strike ended on 3 March 1985, the NCB declared the Bedwas pit closed due to geological problems. Although both the Western Mail and The Times reported in March and April 1985 that closure had been accepted by the work force, the National Union of Mineworkers told the miners to press for an independent colliery review as outlined in the national agreement of October 1984.

As a result, the NCB offered every worker at Bedwas alternative work in other pits, such as Nantgarw Colliery. Those who did not take voluntary redundancy at Bedwas accepted the decision, with the closure of the Bedwas Navigation Colliery finally confirmed in May 1985, and attributed to geological problems. At its closure, Bedwas had amongst the largest claimed reserves of coal of any South Wales mine.

== Incidents ==
- 27 March 1912 - sparks from an electric bell caused an explosion underground which killed 3 miners and seriously injured 9 others
- 10 October 1952 - an explosion of firedamp in the Lower Black Vein seam, resulted in the death of 1 and injuries to 19 others.

== The site today ==
Following closure in 1985, the colliery was demolished quickly and the shafts filled with rubble, possibly to prevent any chance of it reopening in the future. The above ground structures including the co-located coking plant were demolished, but foundations and below ground installations not removed. The main railway line was removed from Trethomas railway station to Newport in 1967, a single track remained until after the Benzol plant was closed, the track then being taken up as far as Machen. Where is it still in use by Machen quarry where a single line carries minerals down through Rwiwderen and onto Bassaleg where it joins the mainline.

The site has since been inherited by Caerphilly County Borough Council, with a majority of the former railway line upgraded to become an extension of the Taff Trail cycle path. It was proposed that removal of the residual historical remains from the rest of the site would outweigh any economic gain from redevelopment. However, in light of central government guidelines to first develop brownfield sites, in early 2010 the council proposed the site as the medium term location of up to 650 new houses and a primary school. This was met with opposition from local residents who wished to see the area developed into something employment or leisure related for the community. However, as of 2020 the site has yet to be built on.
