= Bedwas High School =

Bedwas High School Ysgol Uwchradd Bedwas

Location
- Newport Road; Bedwas, Caerphilly, CF83 8BJ; Wales; 51.590°N 3.192°W

Information
- Type: Community comprehensive school
- Motto: Caring and Achieving - (Gofalu a Chyflawni)
- Established: May 1962
- Local authority: Caerphilly County Borough Council
- Chair: Pam Scourfield
- Headteacher: Stephen Diehl
- Gender: Both
- Age: 11 to 18
- Enrolment: 710 (2023)
- Houses: 3 (Rhymney-Green, Sirhowi-White and Ebwy-Red)
- Colour: Navy Blue
- Website: https://www.bedwashigh.org/

Bedwas High School, formerly known as Bedwas Comprehensive School, is a comprehensive school located east of the Welsh village of Bedwas, Caerphilly county borough, south Wales. It has a total enrollment of about 680 pupils ages 11 to 18.

Bedwas High School was inspected by Estyn, the office of Her Majesty's School Inspectorate for Education and Training in Wales, in 2007 and the school received a favourable report with five 2s and two 1s.

In 2015-16 the school was ranked in the red support category by the Welsh categorisation system. This is the lowest of the 4 possible ratings.

As of 2023, there were approximately 710 pupils in attendance at the school, including those in the sixth form. The school was officially opened in May 1962 (although pupils had been attending since the previous September) to move the Tyn-y-Wern Secondary School from Trethomas. Originally, the school was a community school under Monmouthshire County Council but when county boundaries were revised in 1973, it became one of 46 comprehensive schools in Mid Glamorgan.

As a result of local Government reorganisation in 1996, it became one of 16 comprehensive schools in Caerphilly County Borough. From September 2007, as the result of closure of two of the secondary schools in the Borough (Bedwellty in 2005 and St Ilan in 2007), it became one of 14 secondary schools.

The school serves the community to the east of the River Rhymney. This is made up of the villages of Bedwas, Trethomas, Graig-y-Rhacca and Machen. The school has five feeder schools in its designated catchment area (including Plasyfelin from September 2007) but, in addition, approximately 10% of the pupils come to Bedwas High School from outside the catchment area.

== Estyn report from April 2013 ==
=== Context ===
Bedwas High School is an English-medium 11 to 18 mixed comprehensive school situated to the east of Caerphilly. The school serves the communities from the villages of Bedwas, Trethomas, Graig-y-Rhacca and Machen. The number of pupils has increased from 694 at the time of the last inspection to the current 752. Around 26% of pupils are entitled to free school meals, which is higher than the national average of 17.4%, and 41% of pupils live in 20% most deprived areas of Wales.

The pupils entering the school represent the full range of ability and around 22% have a special educational need. This figure is higher than the national average of 18.6%. Around 3% of pupils have statements of special educational needs. This compares with 2.6% for Wales as a whole. A very few pupils receive support to learn English as an additional language and a very few pupils come from minority-ethnic backgrounds. A very small number of the pupils speak Welsh as their first language. The headteacher has been in post since September 2008. Following the retirement of the school's deputy headteacher Mrs Sue Rivers, the school appointed a new deputy headteacher, Mr Tom Stancombe, in September 2012.

In March 2019, the school came out of special measures, which followed the 2017 Esytn inspection, and moved into monitoring.
