= Mynydd Meio =

Hill in South Wales

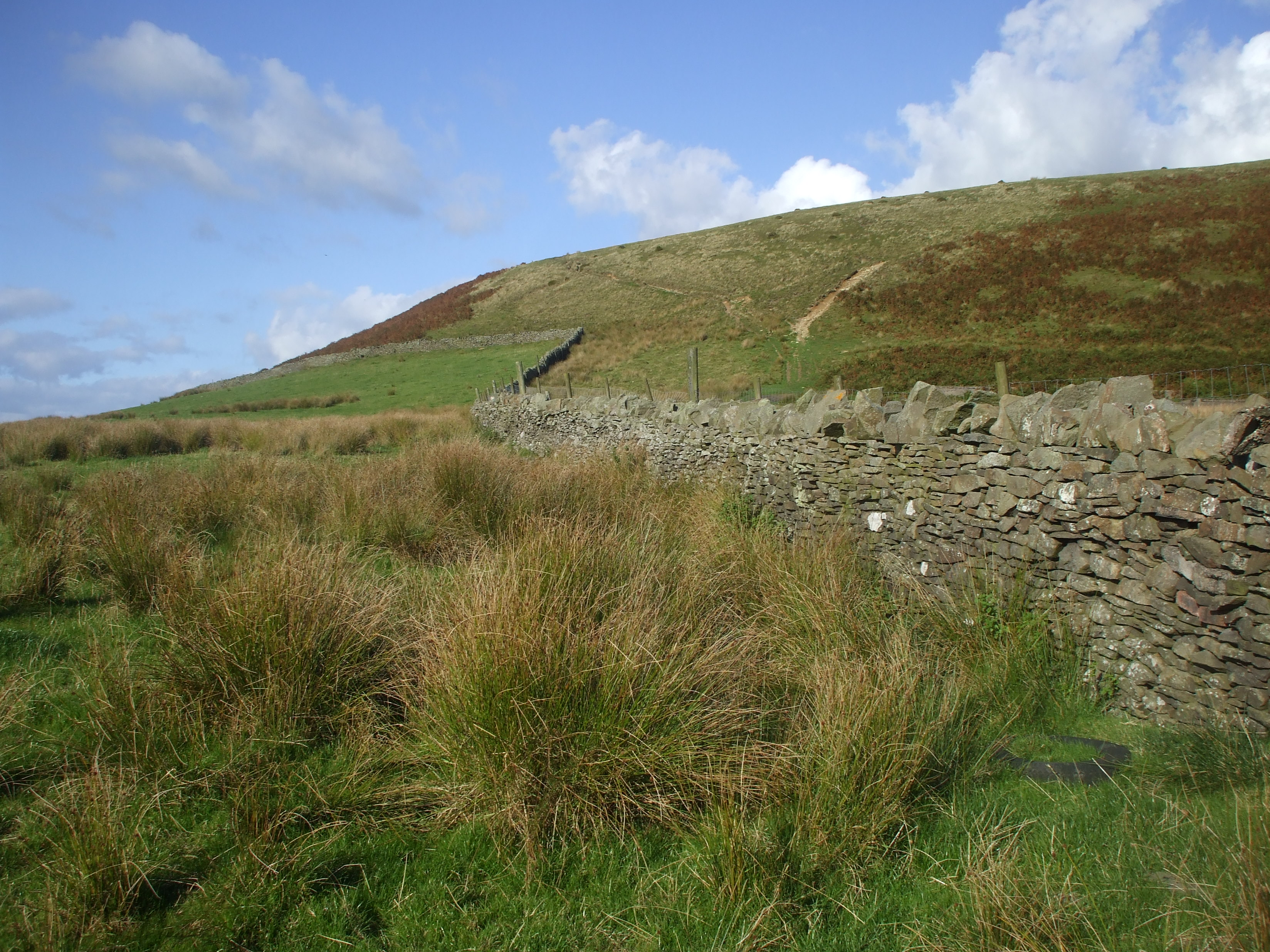
- Mynydd Meio

Highest point
- Elevation: 322 m (1,056 ft)
- Prominence: 96 m (315 ft)
- Coordinates: 51.5886°N 3.2804°W

Naming
- Language of name: Welsh

Geography
- Location: Caerphilly, Rhondda Cynon Taf Wales
- OS grid: ST 114883
- Topo map: OS Landranger 171 / Explorer 166

Mynydd Meio is a 322-metre-high hill in the county borough of Caerphilly in South Wales. Parts of its western slopes fall within Rhondda Cynon Taf county borough. Its eastern slopes drop away to Cwm yr Aber between Caerphilly and Abertridwr and its western slopes to the valley of the Taf. The high point is just over 200 m north of the trig point which sits at 322 metres (1,056 ft) above sea-level.

The hill is crossed by the Senghenydd Dyke, an ancient earthwork considered to date from the 13th century and associated with nearby Caerphilly Castle.

== Geology ==
The hill is formed from the Hughes Sandstone, within the Pennant Sandstone Formation, a sedimentary rock of late Carboniferous age (c 309-306 million years ago).

== Access ==
Much of the upper part of the hill is mapped as open access under the Countryside and Rights of Way Act 2000 and thereby generally available to walkers. It is also crossed by the Rhymney Valley Ridgeway Walk, a recreational path which in the immediate vicinity runs north from the hamlet of Groes-wen over the hill towards Cefn Eglwysilan.
