= Bedwas, Trethomas and Machen =

Bedwas, Trethomas & Machen
- Community
- Location within Caerphilly
- Coordinates: 51.603°N 3.193°W
- Sovereign state: United Kingdom
- Constituent country: Wales
- Region: South Wales
- Ceremonial county: Gwent
- Principal are: Caerphilly

Government
  - Type: Community Council
  - Councillors: List: Elizabeth Aldworth (Lab); Lisa Jones (Lab); Ray Davies (Lab); Derek Havard (Lab); June Gale (Lab); J R Davies (Ind); David Davies (Lab); Brian James (Lab); Emma Davies (Lab); Mike Parsons (Lab); Keith Regan (Lab); Mary Williams (Lab)

Area
  - Total: 7.08 sq mi (18.33 km^{2})

Population (2011)
  - Total: 10,758
  - Density: 1,519/sq mi (586/km^{2})
- Website: http://www.btmcommunitycouncil.com

Bedwas, Trethomas and Machen is a community and an electoral ward in the county borough of Caerphilly, constituting the villages of Machen, Trethomas, Bedwas, and Upper and Lower Graig-y-Rhacca. It lies in the Caerphilly Basin in the shadow of Mynydd y Grug and Mynydd Machen. All villages in the area grew as a result of the coal mining industry, which carries its legacy on today.

== History ==
Bedwas and Machen
- Area
  - 1912: 6,520 acres (26.4 km^{2})
  - 1961: 6,179 acres (25.01 km^{2})
- Population
  - 1911: 4,936
  - 1971: 12,540
- History
  - Created: 1912
  - Abolished: 1974
  - Succeeded by: Rhymney Valley
- Status: Urban district
  - HQ: Bedwas

Bedwas and Machen Urban District was formed on 1 October 1912 from the parishes of Bedwas and Machen Upper, previously part of St Mellons Rural District. In 1935 the boundaries were altered when it exchanged areas with the neighbouring Mynyddislwyn Urban District. The urban district was abolished by the Local Government Act 1972, becoming part of Rhymney Valley District in Mid Glamorgan.

On the abolition of the urban district, a community with identical boundaries was formed, and a community council established. On 16 March 1989 the community was renamed Bedwas, Trethomas and Machen. On 1 April 1996 the Rhymney Valley District was itself abolished, and the community has been part of the county borough of Caerphilly since that date. At the 2001 census Bedwas, Trethomas and Machen had a population of 10,428

The urban district council began operating a bus service in 1922. The UDC was one of the smallest municipal bus undertakings in the United Kingdom, with an average fleet size of seven vehicles. The bus livery was powder blue and cream. The fleet was merged with those of Caerphilly and Gelligaer UDCs in 1974, when Rhymney Valley District Council was formed.

== Present-day ==
Today the area is quite densely populated, with the exception of the mountain area. There are some transport links, with a bus service from Newport to Bargoed running through the community, and two other services running from Graig-Y-Rhacca to Caerphilly town centre. A school serves the villages, as well as BTM Brass Band.
