= Archie Cochrane =

Scottish doctor

Archibald Cochrane CBE
- Born: Archibald Leman Cochrane; 12 January 1909; Galashiels, Scotland
- Died: 18 June 1988 (aged 79); Dorset, England
- Occupations: Physician, epidemiologist
- Known for: Advocacy of randomized controlled trials Influence on evidence-based medicine Inspiration for Cochrane Library

Archibald Leman Cochrane (/ˈkɒkrɪn/; 12 January 1909 – 18 June 1988) was a Scottish physician noted for his book Effectiveness and Efficiency: Random Reflections on Health Services, which advocated the use of randomized controlled trials (RCTs) to improve clinical trials and medical interventions. His advocacy of RCTs eventually led to the creation of the Cochrane Library database of systematic reviews, the UK Cochrane Centre in Oxford and Cochrane (previously known as the Cochrane Collaboration), an international organization of review groups that are based at research institutions worldwide. He is known as one of the fathers of modern clinical epidemiology and is considered to be the originator of the idea of evidence-based medicine. The Archie Cochrane Archive is held at the Archie Cochrane Library at University Hospital Llandough, Penarth.

== Early life and education ==
Cochrane was born in Kirklands, Galashiels, Scotland, into the wealthiest mill owning family in Galashiels. He was acquainted with death from an early age. His father was killed whilst serving with the King's Own Scottish Borderers during World War I. His family nurse and his young brother Walter died from tuberculosis.

Cochrane was academically gifted from an early age. He initially won a scholarship to Uppingham School. Then he acquired a scholarship to King's College, Cambridge, where he achieved a Double First in the Natural Sciences Tripos. Later, in 1930, he completed two MB studies in physiology and anatomy. He qualified in 1938 at University College Hospital, London.

Like his sister, Cochrane inherited porphyria, which caused health problems throughout his life. Medical help in the UK was unavailable. Consequently, he emigrated to Germany where, starting in 1931, he received psychoanalysis which was undertaken by Theodor Reik, initially in Berlin, then in Vienna and eventually in the Hague with the increasing threat to Reik from the Nazis. While receiving psychoanalysis, Cochrane undertook medical research in Vienna and at the University of Leiden. He eventually became dissatisfied with psychoanalysis. However he became fluent in German, which became extremely useful to him when he later served as a doctor in a prison of war camp. During this period, Cochrane acquired a hatred of fascism and became convinced of the importance of anti-fascism. But crucially, in a precursor of his landmark contribution to medicine:

His sojourn in Europe in the early 1930s also instilled in him a hatred of fascism and a sceptical attitude to all theories (including psychoanalysis) which had not been validated in experiments.

In 1936 the Spanish Medical Aid Society was formed in London in response to a request for help from republicans who were fighting fascism in the Spanish Civil War. Cochrane volunteered his services to the committee and subsequently worked in the First British Hospital and in the 35th Medical Division Unit.

== World War II ==
Cochrane joined the British Army in World War II. He was captured during the Battle of Crete in June 1941. Subsequently, he worked as a Medical Officer in prisoner of war camps at Salonika (Greece) and Hildburghausen, Elsterhorst, and Wittenberg an der Elbe (Germany). His experience in the camp led him to believe that much of medicine did not have sufficient evidence to justify its use. During his time in Salonica, he carried out a randomised controlled trial giving either vitamin C or yeast to his fellow prisoners.

He said, "I knew that there was no real evidence that anything we had to offer had any effect on tuberculosis, and I was afraid that I shortened the lives of some of my friends by unnecessary intervention." As a result, he spent his career urging the medical community to adopt the scientific method.

== Early career ==
After the war, Cochrane studied for a Diploma in Public Health at the London School of Hygiene & Tropical Medicine, after which he spent a year at the Henry Phipps Institute in Philadelphia on a Rockefeller Fellowship. In 1948 he joined the scientific staff of the recently formed Medical Research Council's Pneumoconiosis Unit in the Welsh National School of Medicine (now Cardiff University School of Medicine) at Llandough Hospital, Penarth. While there he began his famous series of studies on the health of the population of Rhondda Fach — which pioneered the use of RCTs.

The website of the British Film Institute has a video of the Rhondda Fach studies in which Cochrane talks about his research.

In 1956, Cochrane underwent a radical mastectomy to remove what was thought to be cancerous tissue in his right pectoralis minor and axilla.

== Later career ==
Cochrane was appointed David Davies Professor of Tuberculosis and Chest Diseases at the Welsh National School of Medicine, now Cardiff University School of Medicine in 1960. Nine years later he became Director of the new Medical Research Council's Epidemiology Research Unit in Cardiff. His groundbreaking paper on validation of medical screening procedures, published jointly with fellow epidemiologist Walter W. Holland in 1971, became a classic in the field.

His 1971 Rock Carling Fellowship lecture Effectiveness and Efficiency: Random Reflections on Health Services (first published as a monograph in 1972 by the Nuffield Provincial Hospitals Trust, now known as the Nuffield Trust) was very influential. To quote from the book's summary:

"An investigation into the workings of the clinical sector of the NHS strongly suggests that the simplest explanation of the findings is that this sector is subject to severe inflation with the output rising much less than would be expected from the input". According to a review in the British Medical Journal, "the hero of the book is the randomized control trial, and the villains are the clinicians in the "care" part of the National Health Service (NHS) who either fail to carry out such trials or succeed in ignoring the results if they do not fit in with their own preconceived ideas".

Maintaining this challenge to the medical care system as he saw it, in 1978, with colleagues, he published a study of 18 developed countries in which he made the following observations: "the indices of health care are not negatively associated with mortality, and there is a marked positive association between the prevalence of doctors and mortality in the younger age groups. No explanation of this doctor anomaly has so far been found. Gross national product per head is the principal variable which shows a consistently strong negative association with mortality." This work was selected for inclusion in a compendium of influential papers, from historically important epidemiologists, published by the Pan American Health Organization (PAHO/WHO) in 1988.

Cochrane promoted the randomised trial and is a co-author with Professor Peter Elwood on a report on the first randomised trial of aspirin in the prevention of vascular disease. He retired from the Epidemiology Research Unit in 1974, when he was succeeded in the role by Peter Elwood. After his retirement he was a key adviser in a highly detailed cohort study, the Caerphilly Heart Disease Study.

Cochrane retired in 1974, after which Peter Elwood was appointed as Unit Director.

== Honours ==
Cochrane was awarded an MBE by the British Government for his "gallant and distinguished services" in prisoner of war camps. He was later appointed a CBE for his contributions to epidemiology as a science.

== Publications ==
=== Articles ===
- Cochrane, A.L.; Holland, w.W. (1971). "Validation of screening procedures". British Medical Bulletin. 27 (1): 3–8. doi:10.1093/oxfordjournals.bmb.a070810. PMID 5100948.
- Cochrane, A.L.; St Leger, A.S.; Moore, F. (1978). "Health service 'input' and mortality 'output' in developed countries". Journal of Epidemiology and Community Health. 32 (3): 200–205. doi:10.1136/jech.32.3.200. PMC 1060946. PMID 711980.
- Cochrane, Archibald L. (1984). "Sickness in Salonica: my first, worst, and most successful clinical trial". British Medical Journal. 289 (6460): 1726–1727. doi:10.1136/bmj.289.6460.1726. PMC 1444794. PMID 6440622.

=== Books ===
- 1972. Effectiveness and efficiency Random reflections on health services. London: Nuffield Provincial Hospitals Trust.
- 2009. (Originally 1975 with Max Blythe.) One man's medicine An autobiography of Professor Archie Cochrane (1909 - 1988) - The Cardiff University Cochrane Centenary Edition. Cardiff: Cardiff University. ISBN 0954088433.

== See also ==
- Evidence-based medicine
