= Cwmcarn =

Coordinates: 51.6349°N 3.1299°W

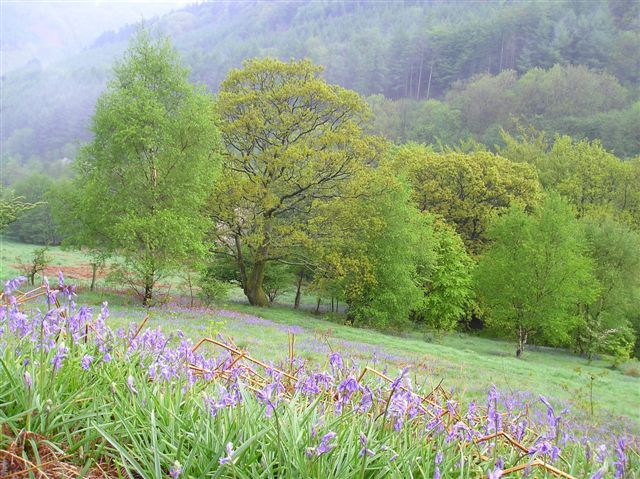
- Cwmcarn Forest Drive in the spring. Looking towards the Graig.

- Location within Caerphilly
- Population: 500
- OS grid reference: ST219935
- Community: Abercarn
- Principal area: Caerphilly
- Preserved county: Gwent
- Country: Wales
- Sovereign state: United Kingdom
- Post town: NEWPORT
- Postcode district: NP11
- Dialling code: 01495
- Police: Gwent
- Fire: South Wales
- Ambulance: Welsh
- UK Parliament: Newport West and Islwyn

Cwmcarn is a village situated in the Ebbw valley in south Wales, in the historic boundaries of Monmouthshire. It grew with 19th-century coal mining, but is now known for its extensive mature forestry and greenery, that attract thousands of visitors and mountain biking enthusiasts each year.

== Pre-industrial history ==
Significant settlement at Cwmcarn came with Bronze Age migration of local tribes from the Gwent levels to the uplands of Mynydd y Grug, Mynydd Machen and Mynydd Maen (Twmbarlwm) and led to a later Iron Age (900–55 BC) hillfort to be constructed by the Silures on Twmbarlwm.

Roman forces took control of most of what became the Roman province of Britannia Superior in 43 AD but then took a further 25 years to gain control of the present day South Wales valleys. Roman control remained established until full scale withdrawal in the 5th century AD when the Kingdoms of Gwent and Glywysing were established. Gwent was defined as the land between the River Usk and the River Wye and Glywysing, the land between the River Usk and the River Tawe. Cwmcarn, located where the Carn and Ebbw river valleys meet, being situated within the Welsh Kingdom of Glywysing.

The Welsh placename of Cwmcarn came about in 942 when Llywarch ap Cadogan gave Villa Treficarn Pont ('estate near the bridge over the Carn') to a Bishop of Llandaff named Wulfrith with King Cadell's guarantee, i.e. the place where the Carn meets the Ebbw (now Cwmcarn).

Following the Norman invasion of Wales the separate townships of Abercarn, Cwmcarn and Newbridge were given a manorial title of Abercarne. The three townships were also within the boundaries of the ancient parish of Mynyddislwyn and remained therein up until comparatively recent times.

== Economic activity ==
=== Coal mining ===
Cwmcarn lies at the south-eastern edge of the South Wales coalfield. The colliery development in the Cwmcarn area started in 1836, when a single shallow, 180 ft downshaft, the Abercarn No.6., was sunk into the Rock (or Tillery) seam, for the nearby Prince of Wales Colliery at Abercarn operated by the Monmouthshire Iron and Coal Company. The second shaft was excavated by the Ebbw Vale Steel Iron & Coal Company to target the deeper No.4 Steam and Black Vein seams. The colliery was run as an individual unit until it was later acquired by Partridge Jones and John Paton and Company in 1935. It was closed by the National Coal Board in November 1968 and the site was cleared after becoming uneconomical to run.

The Cwmcarn Forest Drive now runs over the shafts of the colliery and a relics of colliery buildings can still be seen on the slope above the old shaft. The present day lake that is stocked by the Cwmcarn Angling Association was originally down stream of the colliery's washery.

=== Manufacturing ===
A telecoms factory located between the Ebbw River and the A467 road was part of the British Post Office and British Telecom before being sold to STC plc, Northern Telecom (Nortel), and more recently Solectron. The factory closed during Spring 2007.

== Cwmcarn Forest Drive ==
To the east of the village of Cwmcarn is Cwmcarn Forest Drive, a 7 mile drive through hills and forests on the flanks of the mountain of Twmbarlwm which is operated by Natural Resources Wales. The area is popular as a tourist site and a location for mountain biking, and has seen significant recent development as the world-class Y Mynydd Mojo DH Track mountain biking trail is attracting an increased volume of visitors. A new £2 million visitor centre has been opened.

In the summer of 2018 the area suffered a spate of extensive fires which were deliberately set and "killed many of the newly-planted saplings on the hillsides."

The area was also a victim of the spread of phytophthora ramorum, which had required the felling of "vast swathes" of larch trees in the area to prevent the disease spreading further.

Natural Resources Wales project manager for Cwmcarn, Geminie Drinkwater, stated in September 2019 that alongside local activist Robert Southall and Friends of Cwmcarn Forest Drive, they are now "planting countless native trees, to repopulate Cwmcarn's ancient woodland" and are "looking to improve the forestry and restore it as a tourist hotspot" in conjunction with the local activist group.

== Education ==
- Cwmcarn Primary School
