= Cwmcarn High School =

Former secondary school in Cwmcarn, Wales

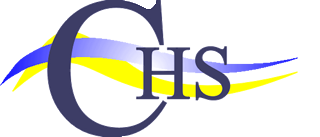
- Cwmcarn; Wales

Information
- Closed: July 2018
- Years: 7-13
- Enrollment: c.400

Cwmcarn High School was a school in the village of Cwmcarn, in South East Wales. The school taught years 7–13.

There were approximately 400 students attending CHS, including the 6th form, prior to its closure. This represented a considerable decrease in numbers since 2012. The school was closed for over a year in 2012 due to asbestos fears. Due to this and the ever-falling school roll, it was confirmed by Caerphilly County Borough Council that the school would close in 2018.

Cwmcarn High served an area of established housing within a former mining village, but it also had drawn pupils from further afield, such as from the nearby city of Newport. Following the reorganisation of the school's status in September 1999, it became a foundation school. A sixth form was established in 1997 with 17 students, and by 2006 served 150+ students.

Approximately 98% of the pupils came from local primary schools. The remainder came from schools beyond the immediate neighbourhood. Almost all of the pupils came from semi-rural areas similar to the village that serves the school.

The school officially closed in July 2018. The school will be demolished to build a new building for the nearby Welsh School Ysgol Gymraeg Cwm Gwyddon.
