= Twyn Community Centre =

Municipal Building in Caerphilly, Wales

- Canolfan Gymunedol Twyn (Welsh)
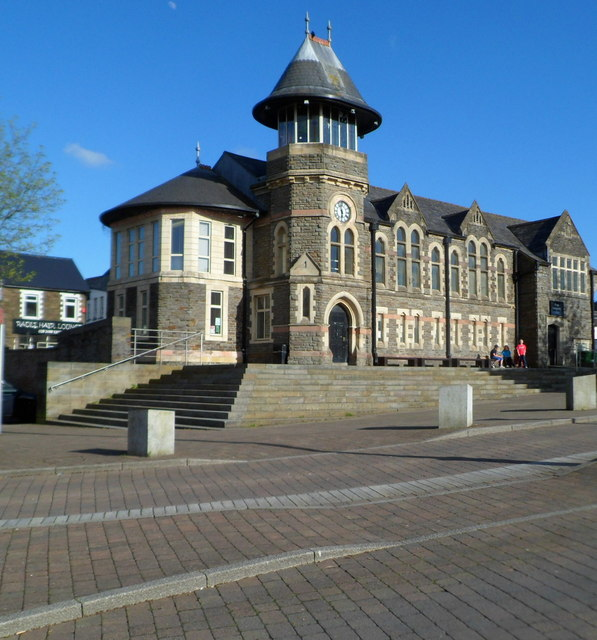
- The building in 2018

- Shown in Caerphilly
- 51.5745°N 3.2177°W
- Location: The Twyn Square, Caerphilly

History
- Built: 1791

Site notes
- Architectural style: Gothic Revival style

Twyn Community Centre (Welsh: Canolfan Gymunedol Twyn) is a municipal building in The Twyn Square in Caerphilly, Wales. The structure, which was commissioned as a Calvinistic Methodist Chapel, now accommodates the offices and meeting place of Caerphilly Town Council.

== History ==
The building was commissioned as a Calvinistic Methodist Chapel, and erected on a mound (Welsh: twyn) to the southeast of Caerphilly Castle. It was built in rubble masonry and completed in 1791.

The chapel was rebuilt in the Gothic Revival style at a cost of £800 in around 1880. The design involved an asymmetrical main frontage facing to the west. The first bay on the left featured a three-stage hexagon-shaped tower, which was projected forward. There was a doorway in the first stage, a pair of arched windows in the second stage and a clock with a stone surround in the third stage, all surmounted by a mansard roof with cresting and finials. The main block of six bays, located to the south of the tower, was fenestrated by lancet windows on the ground floor and by arched windows on the first floor. These were paired in the second and fifth bays, which were surmounted by gables.

In December 1904, the Welsh prophet and leading figure of the 1904–1905 Welsh revival, Evan Roberts visited the chapel and preached to a large crowd of 2,400 people both in the chapel and in other buildings in the surrounding area.

Meanwhile, following significant population growth, largely associated with the mining industry, a local board was established in Caerphilly in 1893. After the local board was succeeded by Caerphilly Urban District Council in 1894, the new council established its headquarters at a converted house called Bron Rhiw on Mountain Road. Bron Rhiw ceased to be the local seat of government when the enlarged Rhymney Valley District Council was established in 1974.

In the 1980s, after the chapel became disused, the new council decided to acquire and enlarge it. A new canted frontage, with an oriel window on the first floor, was added at the north end, a new section was added at the south end, and the height of the tower was increased by the insertion of some stained glass windows below the mansard roof. The enlargement accommodated a community centre as well as offices and a council chamber for Caerphilly Town Council. Since 2006, the building has also been one of the host venues for the Caerphilly Flower Festival.
