= Mynydd Machen =

Hill in Caerphilly County Borough, Wales

Mynydd Machen or Machen Mountain
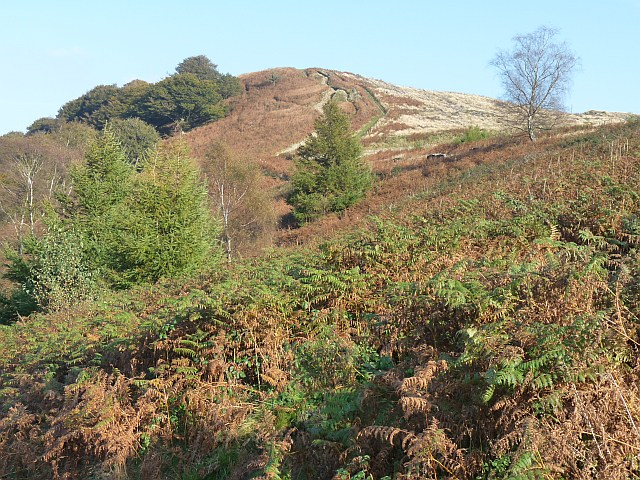
- Looking up towards Mynydd Machen

Highest point
- Elevation: 362 m (1,188 ft)
- Prominence: 185 m (607 ft)
- Listing: Marilyn
- Coordinates: 51.6036°N 3.1222°W

Naming
- Language of name: Welsh

Geography
- Location: Caerphilly, Wales
- OS grid: ST 224900
- Topo map: OS Landranger 171 / Explorer 152

Mynydd Machen or Machen Mountain is a 362-metre-high (1,188 ft) hill lying between the town of Risca and the village of Machen in Caerphilly County Borough in south Wales. Its summit is crowned by a trig point and a mast.

== Geology ==
The hill lies at the southeastern extremity of the South Wales Coalfield where the varied Carboniferous Period rock strata of the coalfield margin are tilted steeply northwestwards into the coalfield basin. The sequence which outcrops on Mynydd Machen in northeast-southwest aligned bands is this (oldest at base):

Warwickshire Group

- Pennant Sandstone Formation

- Brithdir Member
- Rhondda member
- Deri Member

South Wales Coal Measures Group

- South Wales Middle Coal Measures Formation
- South Wales Lower Coal Measures Formation

Marros Group

- Bishopston Mudstone Formation
- Twrch Sandstone Formation

Pembroke Limestone Group

The summit of the hill is formed from the sandstone of the ‘Brithdir Member’ of the Pennant Sandstone Formation. A large quarry towards the south of the hill works the dolomitic limestone of the Pembroke Limestone Group.

== Access ==
Numerous public footpaths criss-cross the hill, some being followed by promoted recreational walking routes such as the Rhymney Valley Ridgeway Walk, the Sirhowy Valley Walk and the Raven Walk. The upper slopes of the hill and most of the woodland which clothes its slopes are mapped as open access under the Countryside and Rights of Way Act 2000 and thereby open to access on foot by the public.
