= Caerphilly Heart Disease Study =

Medical research project

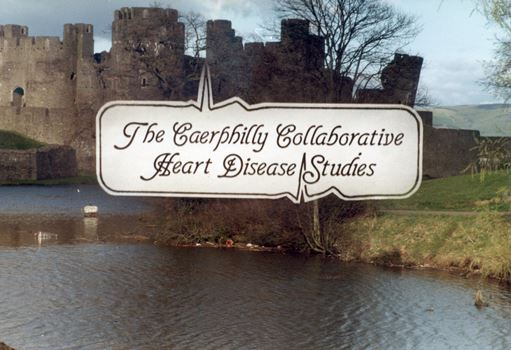
The Caerphilly Heart Disease Study is an epidemiological prospective cohort.

The Caerphilly Heart Disease Study, also known as the Caerphilly Prospective Study (CaPS), is an epidemiological prospective cohort, set up in 1979 in a representative population sample drawn from Caerphilly, a typical small town in South Wales, UK.

The initial aim was to examine relationships between a wide range of social, lifestyle, dietary and other factors with incident vascular disease. Opportunity was also taken, in collaboration with a range of clinical and laboratory colleagues, to collect data on a wide range of factors with possible relevance to diseases other than vascular, and at the same time to collect clinical information on incident disease events. The study was initiated by Professor Peter Elwood, Director of the Medical Research Council (MRC) Epidemiology Unit for South Wales. The work has so far led to over 400 publications in the medical press.

== History ==
In 1948, an MRC epidemiological unit was set up in Cardiff, South Wales, under Professor Archie Cochrane. Peter Elwood joined Cochrane in 1963 and together they promoted long-term studies of representative population samples. They also conducted randomised controlled trials to test a variety of clinical hypotheses. Undoubtedly, the most important of their joint studies was a randomised controlled trial of aspirin showing a reduction of vascular mortality.

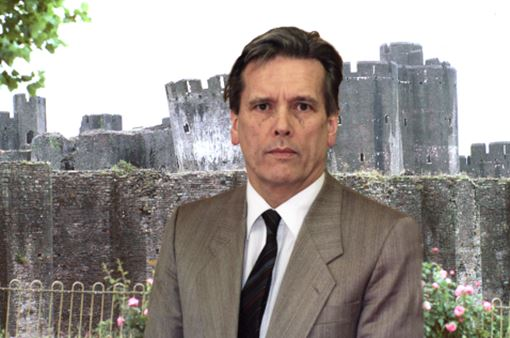
Professor Peter Elwood and his team set up the Caerphilly Heart Disease Study in 1979.

Reported in the British Medical Journal in 1974, this was the first study to demonstrate a protective role for aspirin in the reduction of death and reinfarction. The British Medical Journal recognised this article as one of the 50 most frequently cited papers published between 1945 and 1989.

Following this trial, Elwood and his research team set up the Caerphilly Heart Disease Study, with their primary focus on vascular disease, and the identification of predictors for platelet activity and thrombosis. Caerphilly was chosen for the work because the population was fairly stable, it had age and social class structures similar to that of the whole UK population, and there was a high incidence of ischaemic heart disease compared with the rest of the UK.

== Study design ==
In 1979, all men aged between 45 and 59 years, who were on the electoral registers and/or general practice lists for Caerphilly and the adjoining villages of Abertridwr, Senghenydd, Trethomas, Bedwas and Machen were invited to co-operate in a long-term health study. 2,512 subjects (89% of the total eligible population) agreed to participate and were examined in Phase 1 (baseline) between July 1979 and September 1983.

Since then, the men have been re-examined seven times (at five-year intervals) with approximately 95% of the surviving men co-operating in each re-examination. Many questions and tests have been repeated, but the opportunity has also been taken to include new questionnaires and tests. In the early phases of the study, samples of fasting blood were collected for extensive testing and long-term storage, and on occasions urine and other biological samples were also taken, and aliquots stored. Thus, while the initial aims of the study focused upon vascular disease, the wealth of data collected has enabled the testing of a large number of hypotheses relevant to other diseases too.

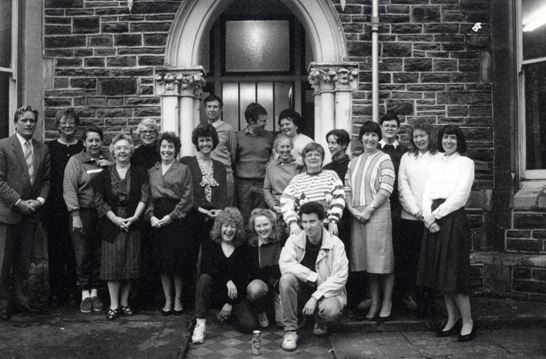
The Caerphilly Study research team, photographed outside the South Wales MRC Unit in Cardiff during the 1980s.

From the start of the study, the term 'Collaborative' was usually added to the title, paying tribute to the many physicians, laboratory technicians and other colleagues, expert in a wide range of clinical and metabolic disciplines, who were actively involved in the work.

Heart disease prevalence is far greater in men than women – therefore women were not included in the study. A far larger sample size would have been required if women had been the focus of the study, and unfortunately, the available resources were not sufficient for this.

The work in Caerphilly was often linked with the Speedwell Study, a similar study operating in nearby Bristol, 60 km away. The survey techniques were similar and a number of questionnaires and biological tests were used in both the studies. This enabled a number of joint reports on vascular disease, and in particular on the relevance of blood lipids, to be based on the five thousand subjects within the two cohorts together.

== Funding ==
Initially, the study was funded by the Medical Research Council and led by Peter Elwood. Following Elwood's retirement in 1995 the study continued under the leadership of Dr John Gallacher (Cardiff University) and Professor Yoav Ben-Shlomo (Bristol University), together with Dr John Yarnell (Queen's University) and Professor Tony Bayer (Cardiff University). Financial support was obtained from the British Heart Foundation and the Alzheimer's Society.

== Aims ==
The Caerphilly Study's research strategy was to identify factors showing an association with vascular disease (and other diseases), and then to test these associations in randomised controlled trials and statistical analysis.

The Framingham Heart Study, a much earlier cohort study in the US, had already shown that cholesterol is an important predictive factor for heart disease, and studies of US Veterans had shown that raised blood pressure is a major factor in stroke. The Caerphilly Study re-tested these predictors together with lipid fractions and high-density lipoproteins (total HDL, HDL2 and HDL3). More recently, arterial resistance and its contribution to blood pressure has also been studied within the cohort.

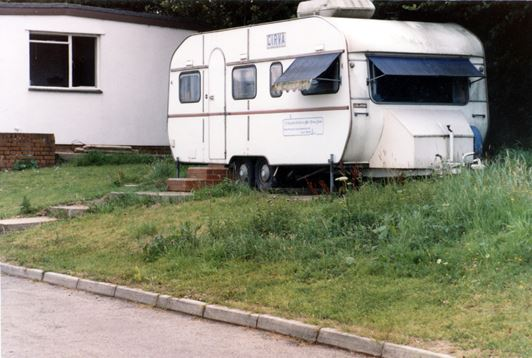
The Caerphilly Study's mobile research unit, parked in the grounds of Caerphilly District Miners' Hospital

The randomised controlled trial of aspirin had shown that blood platelets play a key role in vascular disease. The Caerphilly Study focused on this by developing a large data-bank of platelet testing during the early phases of the study. Platelet collection and analysis was undertaken in close collaboration with Dr John O'Brien, Consultant Haematologist in St Mary's Hospital, Portsmouth, Professor Serge Renaud, a Director of Research in the French National Institute of Health and Medical Research in Lyon, and Professor Rod Flower FRS, then at the University of Bath. The work was done in a specially equipped mobile platelet laboratory, lent to the Caerphilly team by Serge Renaud, and towed by him from INSERM in Lyon, France, to the Miners' Hospital.

Detailed work was also completed on thrombosis and haemostatic factors with the active involvement of John O'Brien and in collaboration with Professor Gordon Lowe, in the Institute of Cardiovascular and Medical Sciences.

At baseline, a 1:3 sample (668 men) completed a 7-day weighed dietary intake record. Data on the dietary intake of each subject in the cohort was collected during each phase of the study.

Ten years into the study a detailed package of cognitive function tests were performed by each subject. These tests have been repeated several times and later enabled the evaluation of factors with possible relevance to cognitive decline and dementia.

== Major findings ==
=== Healthy lifestyles ===
The Caerphilly Study gave opportunity to study the relationship between lifestyle choices and health in a representative population sample drawn from a typical small town in the UK. The participants were asked detailed questions at baseline and at subsequent examinations about lifestyle behaviours, enabling the men to be classified in terms of five healthy behaviours:

- Non-smoking
- A low body weight (BMI 18–25)
- Regular exercise (30 minutes walking or equivalent, five days per week)
- A low fat diet, combined with daily intake of five portions of fruit and vegetables.
- An intake of alcohol within accepted guidelines (21 or less units of alcohol per week).

These healthy behaviours displayed significant negative associations with cognitive impairment and dementia, with participant disease outcomes falling as the number of healthy behaviours followed increased. Men who followed four or five of the healthy behaviours during 30 years of follow-up experienced on average a 73% reduction in diabetes, a 67% reduction in vascular disease, a 35% reduction in cancer (attributable to non-smoking alone) and a 64% reduction in cognitive impairment and dementia.

Healthy behaviours are the responsibility of each individual, and <1% of the men in the Caerphilly Study followed all five, with only 5% following four consistently. Comparisons with data collected in the 2009 Welsh Health Survey indicate that while the pattern of behaviours has changed, the proportions of subjects following four or five of the healthy behaviours has scarcely altered over the past 30 years.

The Caerphilly Study estimated the likely effect of increased healthy living within the community by supposing that each man in the Caerphilly cohort had each been urged at the start of the study in 1979 to adopt just one additional healthy behaviour. If only half of them had complied, then over the following 30 years 12% fewer would have developed diabetes; 6% fewer would have had a vascular disease event; 13% fewer would have developed dementia; and there would have been 5% fewer deaths. A video summarising this work is available on YouTube.

=== Cognitive function ===
Participants were asked to obtain from a close female relative the details of their own birth weight and how they had been fed as infants. Over half of the men obtained these details, and results showed that having been breast fed conferred some protection against the loss of cognitive function later in life, particularly in those whose birth weight had been low.

Smoking, alcohol intake and leisure activities are lifestyle factors which were found to be predictive of cognitive function. Significant associations were also between cognitive function and blood rheology and negative associations with both haematocrit and plasma viscosity, but not with the thrombotic potential of blood, as indicated by fibrinogen level. These relationships appear to be direct, and not through underlying long-term disease processes. Sleep pattern, and in particular severe daytime sleepiness, was also predictive of vascular dementia.

In diabetic subjects, it was found that poor control of blood sugar was associated with a lower cognitive function, and diabetes per se, but none of the components of metabolic syndrome, other than high blood pressure, were predictive of worse cognition. Hearing loss was also found to be predictive of later cognitive impairment and incident dementia.

=== Platelets and thrombosis ===
The main objective of the work on platelets was to identify an aspect of platelet morphology or activity with predictive power for incident vascular disease, which could be developed as a screening test to identify subjects at high risk of a vascular event. In addition to number and size of the platelets, three tests of platelet aggregation were performed, several being repeated after five years. A stressed template bleeding time test was also performed on each man.

No prediction for heart disease was shown by any aspect of platelet morphology nor any platelet test, nor by the bleeding time test. An unexpected finding was that the men who had had the most active platelets in two tests, based on platelet rich plasma and whole blood, had the lowest subsequent risk of an incident ischaemic stroke.

=== Diet and dietary items ===
Detailed analyses of the dietary data identified a number of food items related to vascular disease risk. The consumption of fatty fish was associated with lower levels of blood lipids, and a reduction in vascular disease mortality was confirmed in a randomised trial.

Milk consumption was found to be associated with a small reduction in the metabolic syndrome, and reductions in ischaemic heart disease, ischaemic stroke and diabetes, and these findings were confirmed in later overviews and meta-analyses. A reduction in blood pressure associated with milk consumption is well recognised, but new work in Caerphilly also identified a reduction in arterial stiffness associated with milk consumption.

The consumption of fruit and vegetables was shown to be positively associated with blood antioxidant levels. Detailed work with Serge Renaud on platelet activity showed a beneficial relationship between a low alcohol consumption and platelet aggregation, but an enhanced response to thrombin with binge drinking, confirming previous work in animals.

=== Sleep ===
A detailed questionnaire of sleep pattern was included in one of the re-examinations of the men. In addition to the association with cognitive function already mentioned, there was evidence of an increase in ischaemic stroke in men whose sleep is frequently disturbed, and an association between daytime sleepiness and a significant increase in ischaemic heart disease.

=== Other studies ===
Many analyses of foods and dietary factors were conducted, as well as an examination of Helicobacter pylori and other infections, and vascular disease risk. A reduction in vascular disease mortality was found in those subjects most sexually active. Relationships between vascular disease and psychiatric symptoms, noise exposure, and hearing loss were also identified.
