= Norrie Alden =

Welsh footballer

Personal information
- Full name: Norman Ernest Alden
- Date of birth: 3 November 1909
- Place of birth: Caerphilly, Wales
- Date of death: 22nd Dec 1980 Aged 71
- Position: Forward

Senior career*
Years	Team	Apps	(Gls)
- Llanbradach Colliery
- Mount Carmel Juniors
- Merthyr Town
1933	Liverpool	0	(0)
1935	Oldham Athletic	1	(0)
1936	Southport	7	(2)
- Hereford United
- * Club domestic league appearances and goals

Norman Ernest Alden (3 November 1909 – 1980) was a footballer who played in the English Football League for Oldham Athletic and Southport. He also played for Merthyr Town, Liverpool and Hereford United. He was born in Caerphilly, Wales.

== Playing career ==
In December 1933 he was transferred from Merthyr Town to Liverpool, where he played for the reserves and in local senior cup ties, but never played for the first team and moved on in 1935.

In the summer of 1935 he moved to Oldham Athletic but he only managed one appearance against Mansfield Town on the opening day of the season, 1936 he moved to Southport, where yet again his appearances were limited, this time due to the arrival of forward Joe Patrick. He finished his playing career at Hereford when transferred there in 1937.
