= Coleg Gwent =

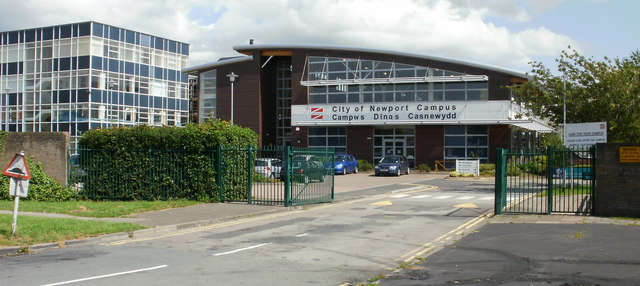
- Coleg Gwent City of Newport campus

Location
- City of Newport Campus; Nash Road; Newport, NP19 4TS; Wales; 51°34′22.8″N 2°57′7.2″W

Information
- Type: Further and Higher Education College
- Principal: Nicola Gamlin
- Gender: Mixed
- Age: 16+
- Enrollment: 19,000 (2018)
- Website: coleggwent.ac.uk

Coleg Gwent (Welsh for 'Gwent college') is a network of further education colleges at various locations in South Wales.

As of 2014, it had 24,000 students ranging from secondary school leavers to mature students. It offers part-time and full-time academic and vocational courses.

== Campuses ==
The college operates from five campuses in South East Wales – City of Newport, Crosskeys, Torfaen Learning Zone, Usk and Blaenau Gwent Learning Zone.

The City of Newport Campus is situated just a few minutes’ drive from the city centre (and just eight minutes from the M4). It offers a range of vocational and academic courses, some delivered in partnership with local schools and all geared towards giving learners the skills businesses in the area are looking for. Campus facilities include: engineering and construction workshops, art studios, science labs, hairdressing and beauty salons, and a digital technology suite.

Crosskeys Campus is the largest of Coleg Gwent’s campuses. It has strong links with local schools and businesses, and offers over 30 A Level subjects, as well as degree qualifications and a diverse range of vocational courses. The campus hosts a performing arts theatre, a restaurant and hair salon that are open to the public, industry-standard equipment for advanced manufacturing courses, a Higher Education hub, and a well-equipped Learning Resource Centre. Crosskeys Campus is also home to the Dragons Junior Rugby Academy, so students can develop their rugby skills alongside their chosen course.

Torfaen Learning Zone in Cwmbran is the newest Coleg Gwent campus, which opened in January 2021. The brand-new purpose-built campus will become the home for all post 16 education in the Torfaen borough. The Learning Zone is located in the heart of Cwmbran and is easily accessible by public transport.

Usk Campus, home to Coleg Gwent’s land-based, sport, outdoor activities and public services courses, is situated in a rural location in the Monmouthshire countryside. It can be easily reached from Monmouth, Abergavenny, Caldicot, Chepstow, Magor, Pontypool and Newport, and it’s close to the M4 motorway. The 850-student campus features a state-of-the-art Learning Resource Centre; a Higher Education Hub; animal and equine centres; refurbished gym, sport and outdoor education facilities; and a new student café. The college's administrative headquarters are also located at the Usk Campus.

Blaenau Gwent Learning Zone in Ebbw Vale opened in 2012 and became the home of all A Level education in Blaenau Gwent, offering A Level subjects and vocational courses for a broad range of industries. The Learning Zone forms part of the regeneration of the old Steelworks site in Ebbw Vale, now known as The Works. Campus facilities include: purpose-built construction workshops, professional kitchens, recording studios, a new composite manufacturing facility, MAC computer suites, a performance area, hair and beauty salons that are open to the public, and a Learning Resource Centre.

== Collaboration ==
The college works in collaboration with the five local education authorities in South East Wales to provide an extensive curriculum designed to meet the needs of learners of all ages.

== Student support ==
Coleg Gwent has a range of learner services to help support students. These include a library, computer and information resources, and a Students' Union.

== Vocational training ==
The college also has a range of vocational training facilities. These include a training restaurant and hair and beauty salons at the Crosskeys campus, Ebbw Vale and Newport. There are also workshops for students studying engineering and construction.

In addition, Usk campus offers agricultural courses and has an equestrian centre and animal care centre on its premises.
