= Twmbarlwm =

Hill in South Wales

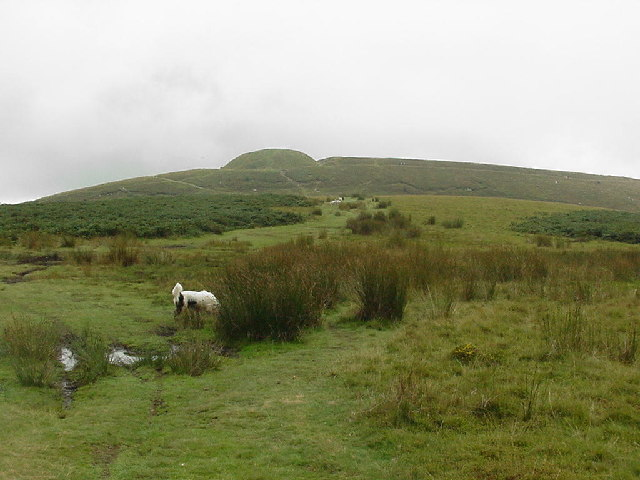
- Twmbarlwm

Highest point
- Elevation: 419 m (1,375 ft)
- Prominence: 48 m (157 ft)
- Coordinates: 51°37′38″N 3°05′47″W

Geography
- Location within Wales
- Location: Risca, Wales
- OS grid: ST242926
- Topo map: OS Landranger 171

Scheduled monument
- Official name: Twm-Barlwm Mound and Bailey Castle
- Designated: 15 September 1933; 92 years ago
- Reference no.: MM044

Twmbarlwm, also known as Twm Barlwm, Twyn Barlwm or locally known as "the Twmp" (translation: hump), the Nipple or the Pimple because of the mound that lies at its summit, is a hill situated 2 km (1.2 mi) to the northeast of Risca in South Wales. It is 419 m (1,375 ft) high and is a well-known landmark throughout the region. It commands extensive views across what is now the M4 corridor, over Newport and Cwmbran - with part of it coming into Cwmbran - and out over the Bristol Channel.

== History ==
At the top of the hill, near its summit, are the remains of what is presumed to be an Iron Age hillfort, believed to have been built by the Silures, the Celtic tribe that inhabited the area before and during Roman times. These remains have led the local people of Risca and Cwmcarn to call it "The Tump". There was also thereafter possibly a Roman signal point and a substantial Norman motte-and-bailey castle which is incorporated into the eastern end of the fort, probably of early Norman construction. The area is a scheduled monument.

== In popular culture ==
The hill itself is a well-known local landmark visible on the skyline for many miles and is indeed seen as a symbol of Monmouthshire/Gwent. It is very popular for hillwalking and mountain biking and with tourists who visit Cwmcarn Forest Drive or walk the Gwent Ridgeway. It features heavily in local folk legends with tales of a giant buried here, and treasure, supposedly guarded by swarms of bees. Local legend says that the druids regarded it as a sacred site and a place of judgement.

The hillfort is known to locals as "the pimple" or "the nipple". An example of the use of the term "pimple" came during a boxing commentary on national radio by the BBC's Raymond Glendenning, who had grown up in Newport. As one of the boxers rose after being floored, Glendenning excitedly announced to the listeners that "he has a lump on his head the size of the pimple on the top of Twm Barlwm!"

In years gone by people from Risca, Cwmbran and Newport enjoyed a day out "up the Tump" on Good Friday - Sunday schools, chapels, youth clubs, families and even whole streets would organise to walk to the top of the Tump - some church groups would carry a cross to the top and sing a few hymns. This tradition probably goes back to medieval times when Twmbarlwm was on the route of the Cistercian pilgrimage trail from Llantarnam to Penrhys. The march with church banners was certainly continued into the 1970s and attempts have been made to revive the tradition as recently as 2012.

Youngsters from neighbouring areas and council estates such as that at Bettws often walk to the top of Twmbarlwm and back home on Good Friday, as a sort of tradition amongst friends and youngsters in the community.

The hill also is noted in the work of such local writers as W. H. Davies and Arthur Machen. Machen described it in his autobiography Far Off Things (1922): "As soon as I saw anything I saw Twym Barlwm, that mystic tumulus, the memorial of peoples that dwelt in that region before the Celts left the Land of Summer." This description was "borrowed" by Dylan Thomas for Llareggub Hill in his Under Milk Wood. Local historian and folklorist Fred Hando tells of the "Mountain Organ" produced by the wind on the southern slopes of the hill, and of the nearby "Pool of Avarice" the site of a great house which was swallowed wholesale by a landslip after the mistress of the house had turned away a hungry beggar. The Cistercian Way (a waymarked, circular, long distance footpath developed in 1998) passes through Llantarnam, Old Cwmbran, Greenmeadow and Thornhill before reaching the ancient chapel of Llanderfel on Mynydd Maen, and then onwards to Twmbarlwm.

In the past 20 years extensive damage has occurred to both the tump and surrounding areas, caused primarily by illegal off-road motorcycles. Several attempts have been made by the local councils to limit this damage by fencing off large areas, but so far all have failed with the fences being destroyed within weeks of erection.

== Gallery ==
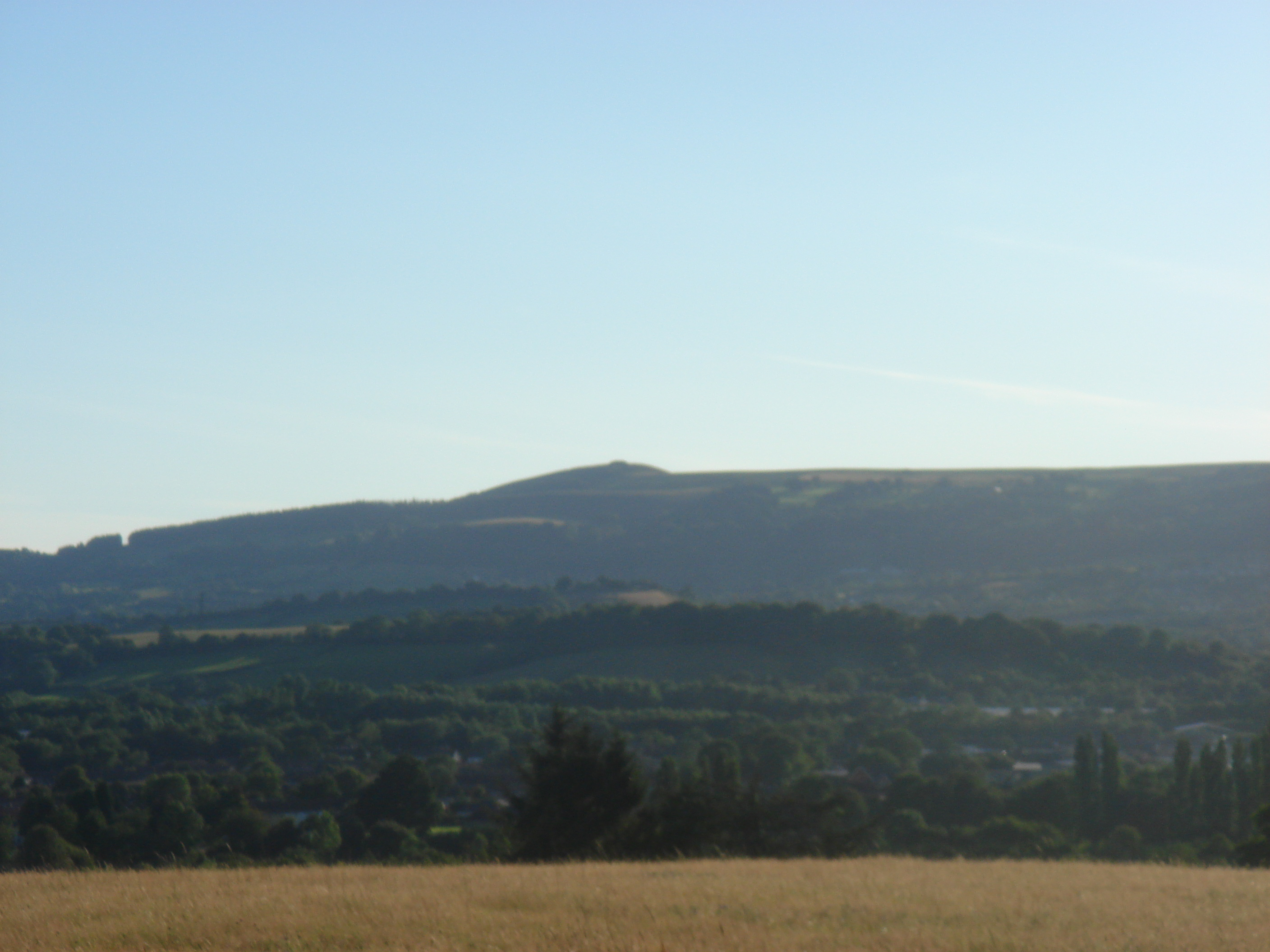
Twmbarlwm seen from Llanfrechfa

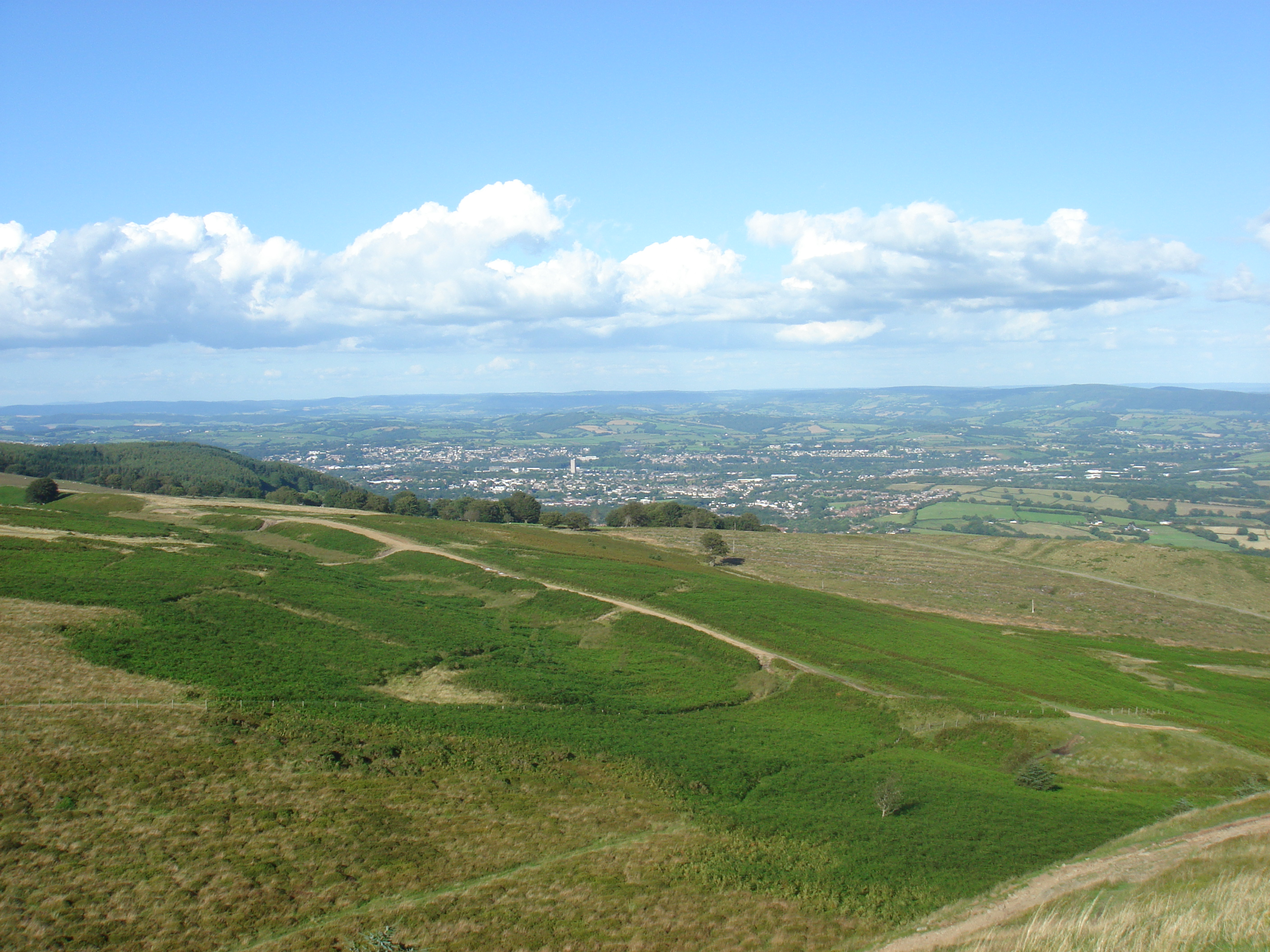
View from Twmbarlwm over Cwmbran

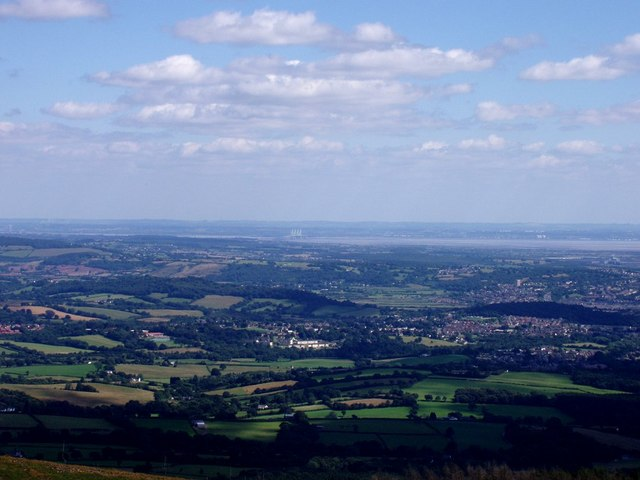
View over the Bristol Channel with the Severn motorway bridges in the distance

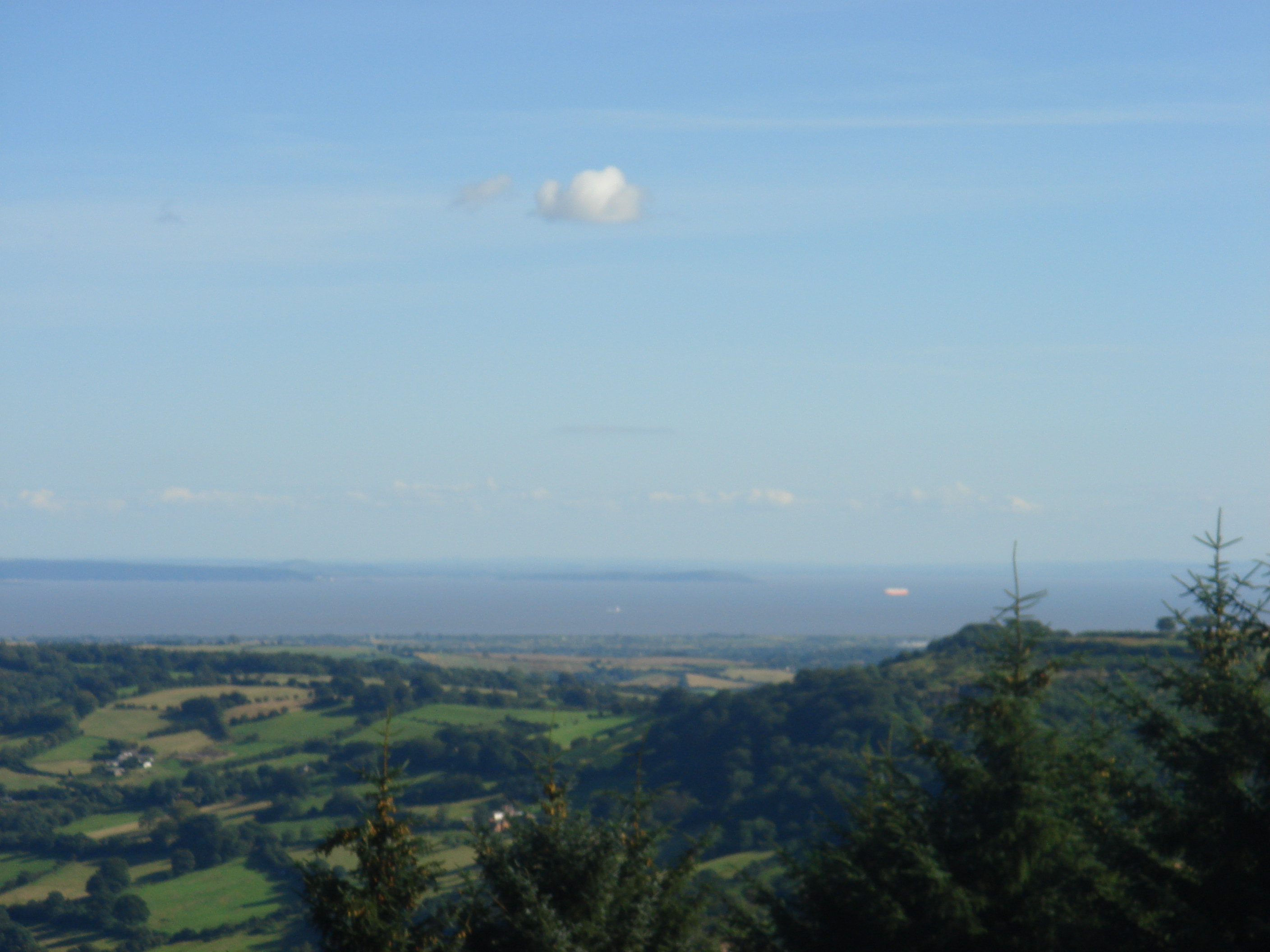
View from Twmbarlwm over the Bristol Channel towards England. Brean Down is in the centre of the photo. Weston-super-Mare is out of sight in the bay to the left of Brean Down.

== See also ==
- List of hill forts in Wales
