= Cefn y Brithdir =

Protected area in Glamorgan, Wales

Coordinates: 51.726°N 3.261°W

Cefn y Brithdir is a broad ridge of high ground between the Rhymney Valley (Welsh: Cwm Rhymni) and Cwm Darran in the Valleys region of South Wales. It lies within the County Borough of Caerphilly.

The northwest–southeast aligned ridge whose top surface is plateau-like, achieves a height of 477m at the summit of Pen Garnbugail (OS grid ref SO 100037). There are significant subsidiary tops of 446m to the southeast at OS grid ref SO 114049 and, to the north, of just over 460m at Mynydd Fochriw (OS grid ref SO 099047). To the south it drops away to the confluence of the Nant Bargod Rhymni with the Rhymney River. To the northwest it falls to a broad saddle at around 360m between Pontlottyn and Fochriw.

Much of its western flanks are afforested with conifer plantations. There are numerous cairns, house platforms and other archaeological features scattered across the area. A Roman road is recorded as crossing the eastern slopes of Pen Garnbugail.

== Geology ==
The entire hill is composed of sandstones and mudstones dating from the Carboniferous Period. There are also numerous coal seams within the sequence, most of which have been worked. The upper part of the hill including the summit plateau is formed from the Pennant Sandstone, a rock assigned to the Carboniferous Upper Coal Measures. The flanks of the hill owe their steepness in part to the action of glacial ice during the succession of ice ages.

== Access ==
A minor public road runs along the southern half of the ridge and this route is followed by the Rhymney Valley Ridgeway Walk. Various other minor roads run up and across its northern reaches. Significant parts of the hill are moorland and have been mapped as open country under the CRoW Act thus giving a right of access to walkers. Similar rights apply to many of the afforested areas. There are a number of public footpaths and other public rights of way over the hill.
