= Bedwas Workmen's Hall =

Workmen's hall and former cinema in Wales

Coordinates: 51.5904°N 3.1896°W

Bedwas Workmen's Hall / Neuadd y Gweithwyr Bedwas

- Photographed in 2019
- Interactive map of Bedwas Workmen's Hall / Neuadd y Gweithwyr Bedwas
- Address: Bedwas; Wales
- Capacity: 500 people
- Type: Volunteer Run Entertainment Establishment

Construction
- Opened: December 1923

Website
- www.bedwasworkmenshall.co.uk

Bedwas Workmen's Hall, built in 1923, is a community hall situated in the village of Bedwas, in south Wales.

It is a Grade II listed building, but still for hire and regularly used for a range of activities including plays, children's parties and music events as it has a generously sized performance space for all types of professional and amateur productions.

It is now run by the Bedwas Workmen's Hall Community Centre (Charity No.1006294).
