= Rhymney Valley Ridgeway Walk =

Footpath in Wales

The Rhymney Valley Ridgeway Walk is a waymarked long distance footpath in the UK forming a circular walk in the Rhymney Valley area of South Wales.

== Distance ==
The Rhymney Valley Ridgeway Walk is approximately 45 kilometres (~28 miles) long.

== Route ==
The walk route starts at Rhymney and heads south down the Rhymney Valley where it becomes a circular loop and runs around the Caerphilly basin linking the three main upland ridges of Mynydd-y-Grug, Thornhill/ Y Ddraenen and Eglwysilan and passes through Caerphilly, Bedwas, Hengoed, Rudry and Machen, the highest point on the route is at Cefn y Brithdir at 446 metres.

The South Wales Valleys offer a post-industrial landscape full of industrial archaeology, reclaimed industrial sites and new light industry to replace the heavy coal industry of old. The area also has castles such as Caerphilly Castle and Ruperra Castle, prehistoric and Roman age sites and offers the day walker and the whole route walker a mix of demanding upland walking, panoramic views and, varied sites to visit and places to stay.
