= Trethomas =

Coordinates: 51.593°N 3.182°W

- Location within Caerphilly
- OS grid reference: ST185885
- Community: Bedwas, Trethomas and Machen
- Principal area: Caerphilly
- Preserved county: Gwent
- Country: Wales
- Sovereign state: United Kingdom
- Post town: CAERPHILLY
- Postcode district: CF83
- Dialling code: 029
- Police: Gwent
- Fire: South Wales
- Ambulance: Welsh
- UK Parliament: Caerphilly

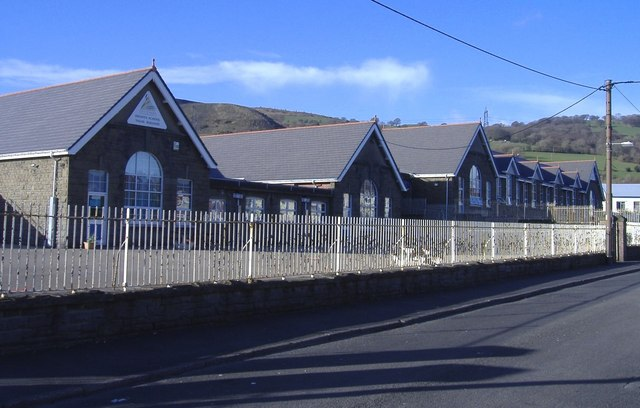
Picture of one of the infant schools

Trethomas (English: Thomastown) is a small village 2 1/2 miles (4 km) northeast of Caerphilly, southeast Wales, situated in the Caerphilly county borough, within the historic boundaries of Monmouthshire.

It neighbours Bedwas and Machen, and forms a council ward in conjunction with those communities.

== Post-1900 new town ==
With an original name of Thomastown, it was mainly built by William James Thomas, a co-owner of the Bedwas Navigation Colliery Company, (also of mines in Aberdare in the Cynon Valley). Most of the earlier parts of Trethomas were built in and around 1900–1913, when the mine was developing and at the apex of coal production in the South Wales coalfield. Many of the terraced streets of Trethomas were named after members of William Thomas's family, hence the names William, James, Thomas and Mary. Others involved association with local areas, such as Navigation Street (associated with the Bedwas Navigation Colliery Company) and Redbrook Avenue, after Redbrook House, which once stood on the left of the road entering the village from Machen (opposite the Chequered Flag petrol station), until its demolition in the late 1950s. It was named after the brook that ran nearby and coloured red with rust from the old drift mine that was situated at Glyn Gwyn – now redeveloped as Addison Way leading up to Graig-Y-Rhacca. The bridge over the now demolished railway line on Addison Way was built on the remains of the coal tipping from the mine.

== History ==
The oldest building in Trethomas was the Ty'n-Y-Pwll Inn, known locally as the 'Pyke' (Turn-Pike in English) due to the building being the original Toll House where tolls were charged for the use of the Toll road between Caerphilly and Newport. After closing as a public house, the building was empty and unused for many years. Connections Community Hub (CCH) agreed to purchase the building in 2014 and had plans to create a multi-functional hub for the whole community to use but the plan collapsed after the charity behind the scheme could not secure funding. In January 2021, despite local opposition to the plans, permission was granted by Caerphilly County Borough Council to demolish the now derelict building and replace it with flats. The building was demolished in August of that year.

The Brecon and Merthyr Tydfil Junction Railway ran through Trethomas, east to Newport and west to Rhymney, Merthyr Tydfil and Brecon via Talybont-on-Usk. Passenger traffic ceased on 31 December 1962 (the loop line from White Hart to Gwern y Doman via Fountain Bridge closed on 17 September 1956), but the line remained in freight use as far as Bedwas until the closure of Bedwas Navigation Colliery in 1985. Nature has since engulfed the two platforms of the old station, and most of what remains of the former trackbed between Trethomas and Machen has been updated by Sustrans as a cyclepath/walkway which joins Route 4 of the National Cycle Network at Graig-Y-Rhacca.

Nothing remains of the colliery, which closed in March 1985 during the 1984–1985 United Kingdom miners' strike. The British Benzol coke ovens, which closed on Christmas Eve 1986, located at the top of upper Navigation street next to Tynywern Terraces, were aptly named 'The White City' mainly because the streets and houses were always dirty due to the coke ovens being so close and the coal dust stirred up by the emptying of the wagons into the hoppers. The colliery and what was termed 'The Plant' closed after the 1984/85 miners' strike.

The ground on which the colliery stood is yet to be redeveloped. The ground reportedly has high concentrations of benzines in the soil and therefore it would be dangerous to reuse in its present condition. This is one major blight on the landscape. Caerphilly County Borough Council inherited most of the land and face a difficult situation; cleaning up the land would more than likely cost more than what the land is worth, so restoration work in the future is unlikely.

It is worthy of note that, during World War II, German aircraft actually dropped bombs, both incendiary and active, on the top of Caerphilly Mountain (visitors to the area will find it still full of craters) mistaking it for the Bedwas/Trethomas mountain where the intention was to eliminate the National Benzol 'plant' which produced aviation fuels from the coal as by-products.

Since the closure of the collieries further up the valley, the previously heavily contaminated Rhymney River, which passes through Trethomas, has become a clean river, now teeming with wildlife and fish after many barren years.

The 'Fountain Bridge' on the main road between Trethomas and Waterloo was so named because, for many years, prior to road alterations, there was a free running spring at the roadside close to the site of the bridge. The point where the spring emerged was fashioned into a stone 'fountain well' which was regrettably demolished during the road works to improve the road.

Over many years, Trethomas has continually expanded in all directions, not only in industry, but in housing as well, so much so that it is now difficult to work out exactly where Bedwas ends and Trethomas starts. Today, notable residents include Jeff Whitefoot (Bedwas, Cardiff and Wales Lions rugby player).

== Health research ==
Men from Trethomas participate in one of the world's longest running epidemiology studies – the Caerphilly Heart Disease Study. Since 1979, a representative sample of adult males born between 1918 and 1938, living in Caerphilly and the surrounding villages of Abertridwr, Bedwas, Machen, Senghenydd and Trethomas, have participated in the study. A wide range of health and lifestyle data have been collected throughout the study and have been the basis of over 400 publications in the medical press. A notable report was on the reductions in vascular disease, diabetes, cognitive impairment and dementia attributable to a healthy lifestyle.
