= Peter Elwood =

Peter Elwood (born 1930) is professor of epidemiology who for more than two decades led the Medical Research Council's Epidemiological Unit in South Wales. In 1979 he initiated the Caerphilly Heart Disease Study.

== Career ==
Elwood completed four house jobs and six months in general practice, before opting towards epidemiology and studying whether some lung diseases favoured Northern Irish flax workers.

His work has included a 35 year study involving over 2,500 men, on the effects of aspirin on platelets and heart disease, carried out in Caerphilly, Wales.

He showed that absorption of iron from iron salts added to bread was at "about 4 per cent" in women with low hemoglobin level, which was lower than the previously assumed amount of "about 30 per cent". He showed that giving milk to vulnerable children at school was beneficial but was not re-implemented.

The study conducted to prove the lower absorption of iron, was conducted on 21 Indian immigrant women in the British town Coventry. It is not clear whether or not the participants of the study consented to it being conducted on them. The flour of the chapattis was laced with radioactive iron.

== Selected publications ==
- Elwood, P.C. (1966). "Utilization of food iron--an epidemiologist's view". Nutritio et Dieta; European Review of Nutrition and Dietetics. 8 (3): 210–225. doi:10.1159/000175143. ISSN 0550-4031. PMID 5333573.
- Elwood, P. C.; Newton, D.; Eakins, J. D.; Brown, D. A. (October 1968). "Absorption of iron from bread". The American Journal of Clinical Nutrition. 21 (10): 1162–1169. doi:10.1093/ajcn/21.10.1162. ISSN 0002-9165. PMID 5686243.
- Elwood, P.C.; Benjamin, I.T.; Fry, F.A.; Eakins, J.D.; Brown, D.A.; De Kock, P.C.; Shah, J.U. (October 1970). "Absorption of iron from chapatti made from wheat flour". The American Journal of Clinical Nutrition. 23 (10): 1267–1271. doi:10.1093/ajcn/23.10.1267. ISSN 0002-9165. PMID 5475656. (Co-author)
- ELWOOD PC; COCHRANE AL; BENJAMIN IT; SEYS-PROSSER D (October 1964). "A Follow-Up Study of Workers from an Asbestos Factory". British Journal of Industrial Medicine. 21 (4): 304–307. doi:10.1136/oem.21.4.304. ISSN 0007-1072. PMC 1038406. PMID 14253230. (Co-author)
- Yarnell, J. W.; Baker, I. A.; Sweetnam, P. M.; Bainton, D.; O'Brien, J. R.; Whitehead, P. J.; Elwood, P. C. (March 1991). "Fibrinogen, viscosity, and white blood cell count are major risk factors for ischemic heart disease. The Caerphilly and Speedwell collaborative heart disease studies". Circulation. 83 (3): 836–844. doi:10.1161/01.CIR.83.3.836. ISSN 0009-7322. PMID 1999035. (Co-author)
- Elwood, P. (November 2006). "The first randomized trial of aspirin for heart attack and the advent of systematic overviews of trials". Journal of the Royal Society of Medicine. 99 (11): 586–588. doi:10.1177/014107680609901121. ISSN 0141-0768. PMC 1633560. PMID 17082305.
