= Mynydd y Grug =

Highest point
- Elevation: 375 m (1,230 ft)
- Prominence: 104 m (341 ft)
- Coordinates: 51.6091°N 3.1903°W

Naming
- English translation: hill of the mound/barrow
- Language of name: Welsh

Geography
- Location: Caerphilly, Wales
- OS grid: ST 176910
- Topo map: OS Landranger 171 / Explorer 166

Mynydd y Grug is a hill lying just west of the village of Cwmfelinfach and about 4 km to the northeast of Caerphilly in Caerphilly county borough in South Wales. Its summit was formerly at a height of around 358 m, but since the top has been covered by a large spoil heap and landscaped its height has now increased to 375 m, though some authorities take other values for the summit height. A number of ancient cairns are found along its edge overlooking the Sirhowy Valley, the slopes up from which are largely wooded.

== Geology ==
Mynydd y Grug is formed from sandstones of the Pennant Sandstone Formation assigned to the Warwickshire Group and laid down during the latest part of the Carboniferous Period. The hill lies in the southeastern part of the South Wales Coalfield and coal seams such as the 'Dirty' and the 'Cefn Glas' have been worked around its flanks.

== Access ==
The hill is crossed by a number of public footpaths, one of which is a restricted byway linking two cul-de-sac minor roads approaching from Machen to the east and Blackwood to the north. This route is followed by the Rhymney Valley Ridgeway Walk. A part of the plateau is mapped as open access and available for walkers to wander freely.
