= Machen =

Coordinates: 51.596°N 3.139°W

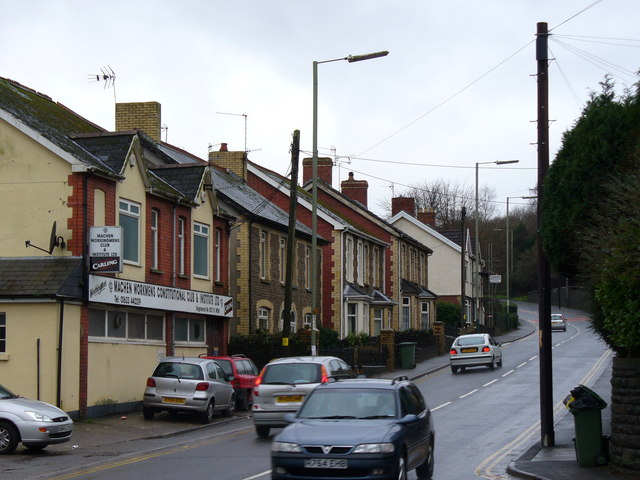

- Location within Caerphilly
- Population: 2,362
- OS grid reference: ST215895
- Principal area: Caerphilly
- Preserved county: Gwent
- Country: Wales
- Sovereign state: United Kingdom
- Post town: CAERPHILLY
- Postcode district: CF83
- Dialling code: 01633
- Police: Gwent
- Fire: South Wales
- Ambulance: Welsh
- UK Parliament: Caerphilly
- Senedd Cymru – Welsh Parliament: Caerphilly

Machen (from Welsh ma "place (of)" + Cein, a personal name) is a large village three miles east of Caerphilly, south Wales. It is situated in the Caerphilly borough within the historic boundaries of Monmouthshire. It neighbours Bedwas and Trethomas, and forms a council ward in conjunction with those communities. It lies on the Rhymney River. Mynydd Machen (Machen Mountain) provides a view over the village. It is possible to walk up to and along the top of the mountain, where a number of large boulders are present.

Machen has a successful boules (petanque) team that are located at the rugby club. The team has had a team in the first Division of the boules in Gwent (BIG) league for the last four years.

== Industrial history ==
From the 17th century onward Machen was a village rooted in the iron and coal industries. Though little trace remains, the village was the site of the Machen Forge and several coal mines. A local history trail visits some of these sites. Machen Forge was an early adopter of the Osmond process for the production of wrought iron.

Machen railway station, which closed in 1964, was an important junction on the Brecon and Merthyr Railway, with a branch to Caerphilly on the Pontypridd, Caerphilly and Newport Railway, closed to passengers in 1956. A multiple-arch railway viaduct can still be seen where it used to carry the eastbound branch of the Caerphilly Branch line over the river. It was built to allow the heavy trains out of Caerphilly to bypass the 1 in 39 incline up into Machen. The westbound branch crossed the Rhymney river at Fountain Bridge before rejoining the eastbound branch at Gwaun-y-Bara. The 'Fountain Bridge' where the main road between Trethomas and Machen crossed the railway was so named because, for many years, prior to road alterations, there was a free-running spring at the roadside close to the site of the bridge. The point where the spring emerged was fashioned into a stone 'fountain well' which was regrettably demolished during the road works to improve the road.

A residual branch of the B&MR remains open to service the Heidelberg Materials quarry at Machen.

At Waterloo there was a Tinworks that supplied materials to the aircraft factory that once stood near the foundry above Royal Oak at Machen. Close to the Waterloo Tinworks, but on the other side of the railway became the factory that was Coates Brothers Paint Works, which later evolved into the Valspar paint division and later again became associated in the production of Inks and dyes. Nothing remains of the now demolished factory buildings, but plans for housing developments are in place.

== Twin towns ==
- Sautron, France (since 1993)

== Notable people ==
Notable people from Machen include -

- Ron Davies, often claimed as the "architect of Welsh devolution". He was honoured as a member of the Gorsedd with the bardic name "Ron o Fachen" (Ron from Machen).
- Alfred Edward Morgans (17 February 1850 – 10 August 1933), Premier of Western Australia for just 32 days in 1901, was born in Machen.
- Ian Thomas (born 1979), former Glamorgan County Cricket Club cricketer, is from Machen. He played for Glamorgan between 1998 and 2005, winning two one day league winners trophies with the club. He is also known for having scored the first televised Twenty20 century in 2004 (116 not out against Somerset).

== Health research ==
Men from Machen participate in one of the world's longest running epidemiology studies, the Caerphilly Heart Disease Study. Since 1979, a representative sample of adult males born between 1918 and 1938, living in Caerphilly and the surrounding villages of Abertridwr, Bedwas, Machen, Senghenydd and Trethomas, have participated in the study. A wide range of health and lifestyle data have been collected throughout the study and have been the basis of over 400 publications in the medical press. A notable report was on the reductions in vascular disease, diabetes, cognitive impairment and dementia attributable to a healthy lifestyle.

== Community Archives Wales ==
In 2008 Machen Remembered, the local archive group, received assistance from Community Archives Wales, to instruct their members in using computers to scan and upload their comprehensive Machen archive onto the Community Archives Wales website. This has been a great success with many of Machen's pictures now available for viewing on the website.

== Community groups ==
Machen Rural Market is a monthly social hub delivered by Cotyledon Business and Management CIC. The ethos of the market is to bring locally grown produce and craft to local communities.

== See also ==
- Lower Machen
- Machen RFC
- Rhymney Valley Ridgeway Walk
