= Caerphilly =

Town in South Wales

Caerphilly: Welsh: Caerffili
- Town
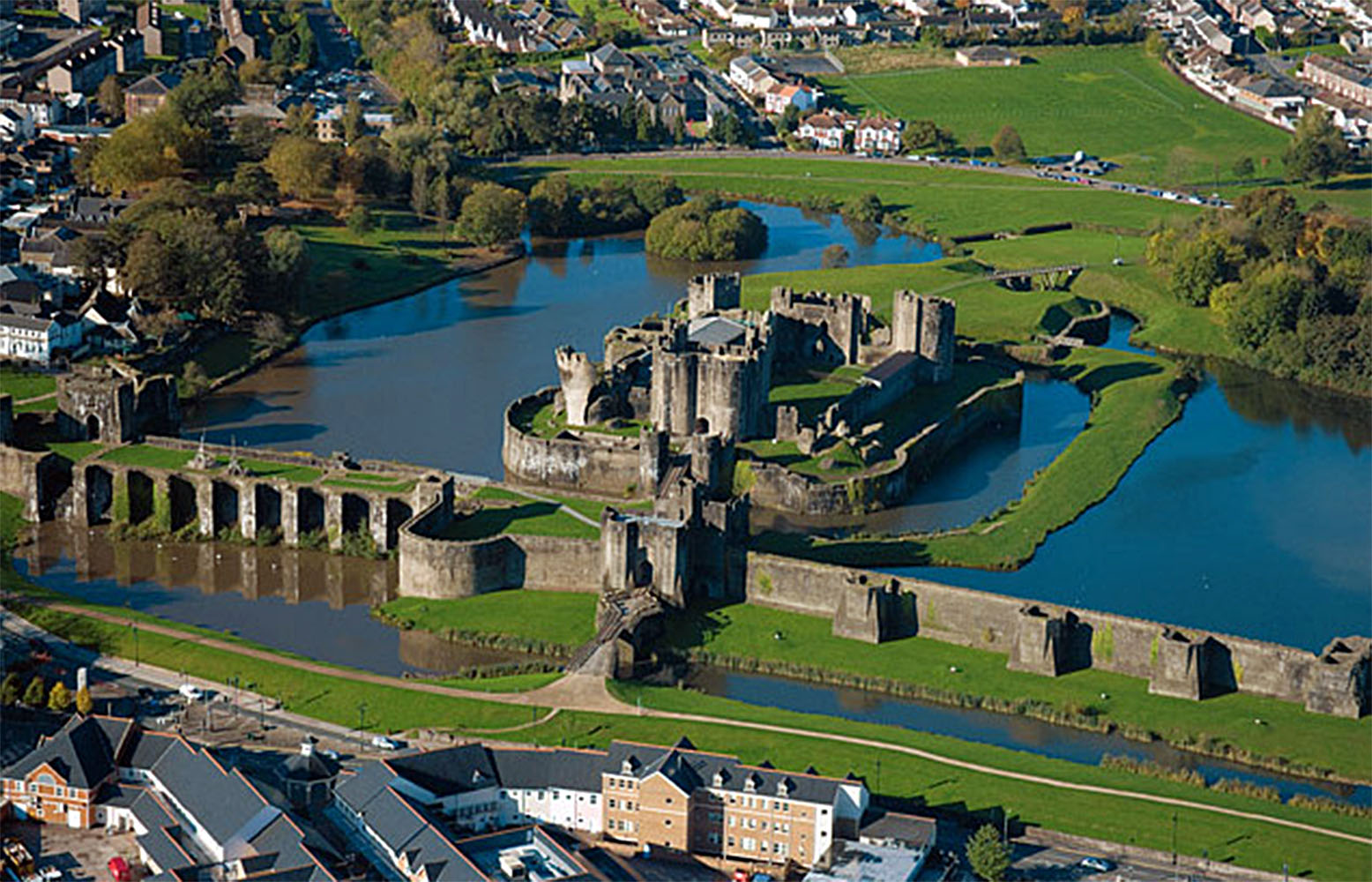
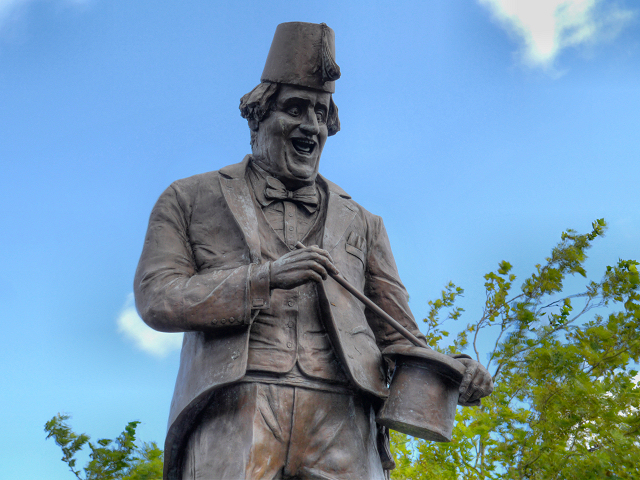
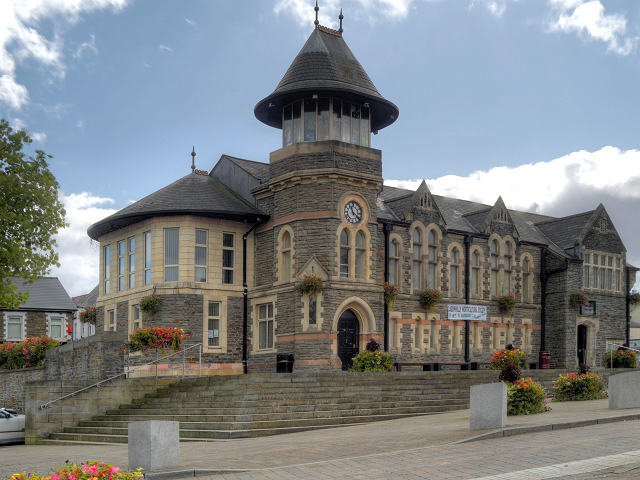
- From the top, Caerphilly Castle, Tommy Cooper Statue, Twyn Community Centre

- Location within Caerphilly
- Population: 41,402 (2011 census)
- OS grid reference: ST1586
- Principal area: Caerphilly
- Preserved county: Gwent
- Country: Wales
- Sovereign state: United Kingdom
- Post town: CAERPHILLY
- Postcode district: CF83
- Dialling code: 029
- Police: Gwent
- Fire: South Wales
- Ambulance: Welsh
- UK Parliament: Caerphilly
- Senedd Cymru – Welsh Parliament: Blaenau Gwent Caerffili Rhymni
- Website: caerphillytowncouncil.co.uk
- List of places UK Wales Caerphilly 51°34′41″N 3°13′05″W Map of the community

Caerphilly (/kəˈfɪli/, /kɑːrˈfɪli/; Welsh: Caerffili, Welsh pronunciation: [ˌkairˈfɪli]) is a town and community in Wales. It is situated at the southern end of the Rhymney Valley and separated from the Cardiff suburbs of Lisvane and Rhiwbina by Caerphilly Mountain.

It is 7 miles (11 km) north of Cardiff and 9.5 miles (15.3 km) west of Newport. It is the largest town in Caerphilly County Borough and lies within the historic borders of Glamorgan, on the border with Monmouthshire. At the 2011 Census, the town had a population of 41,402 As of the 2021 census, the population of the wider Caerphilly local authority area stands at: 176,000 decreasing from the 2011 censes report of 178,000, a fall of 1.6%

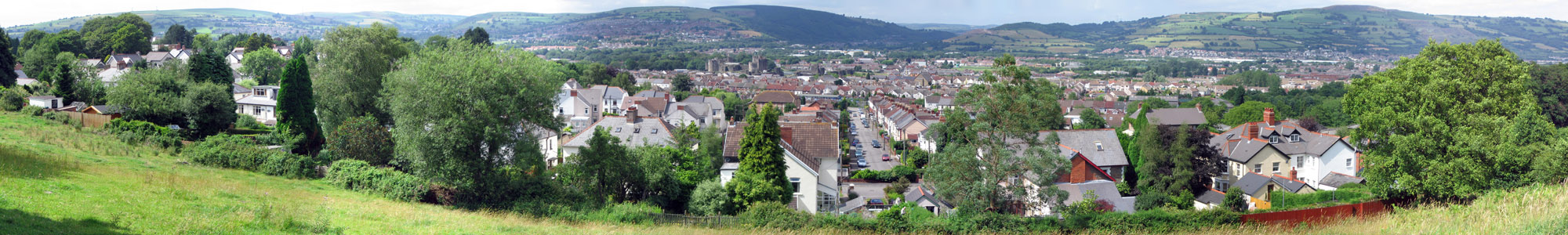

== Toponymy ==
The name of the town in Welsh, Caerffili, means "the fort (caer) of Ffili". Despite lack of evidence, tradition states that a monastery was built by St Cenydd, a sixth-century Christian hermit from the Gower Peninsula, in the area. The Welsh cantref in the medieval period was known as Senghenydd. It is said that St Cenydd's son, St Ffili, built a fort in the area, giving the town its name. An alternative explanation is that the town was named after the Anglo-Norman Marcher Lord, Philip de Braose.

== History ==
The town's site has long been of strategic significance. Around AD 75, a fort was built by the Romans during their conquest of Britain. An excavation of the site in 1963 showed that the fort was occupied by Roman forces until the middle of the second century.

Following the Norman invasion of Wales in the late 11th century, the area of Sengenhydd remained in Welsh hands. By the middle of the 12th century, the area was under the control of the Welsh chieftain Ifor Bach (Ifor ap Meurig). His grandson Gruffydd ap Rhys was the final Welsh lord of Sengenhydd, which fell to the English nobleman Gilbert de Clare, the Red Earl, in 1266. In 1267 Henry III was forced to recognise Llywelyn ap Gruffudd as Prince of Wales, and by September 1268 Llywelyn had secured northern Sengenhydd. Gilbert de Clare had already begun to take steps to consolidate his own territorial gains, beginning the construction of Caerphilly Castle on 11 April 1268. The castle would also act as a buffer against Llewelyn's own territorial ambitions and was attacked by the Prince of Wales' forces before construction was halted in 1270. Construction recommenced in 1271 and was continued under the Red Earl's son, Gilbert de Clare, 8th Earl of Gloucester. With only interior remodelling carried out to the castle by Hugh le Despenser in the 1320s, Caerphilly Castle remains a pure example of 13th-century military architecture and is the largest castle in Wales, and the second largest in Britain (after Windsor).

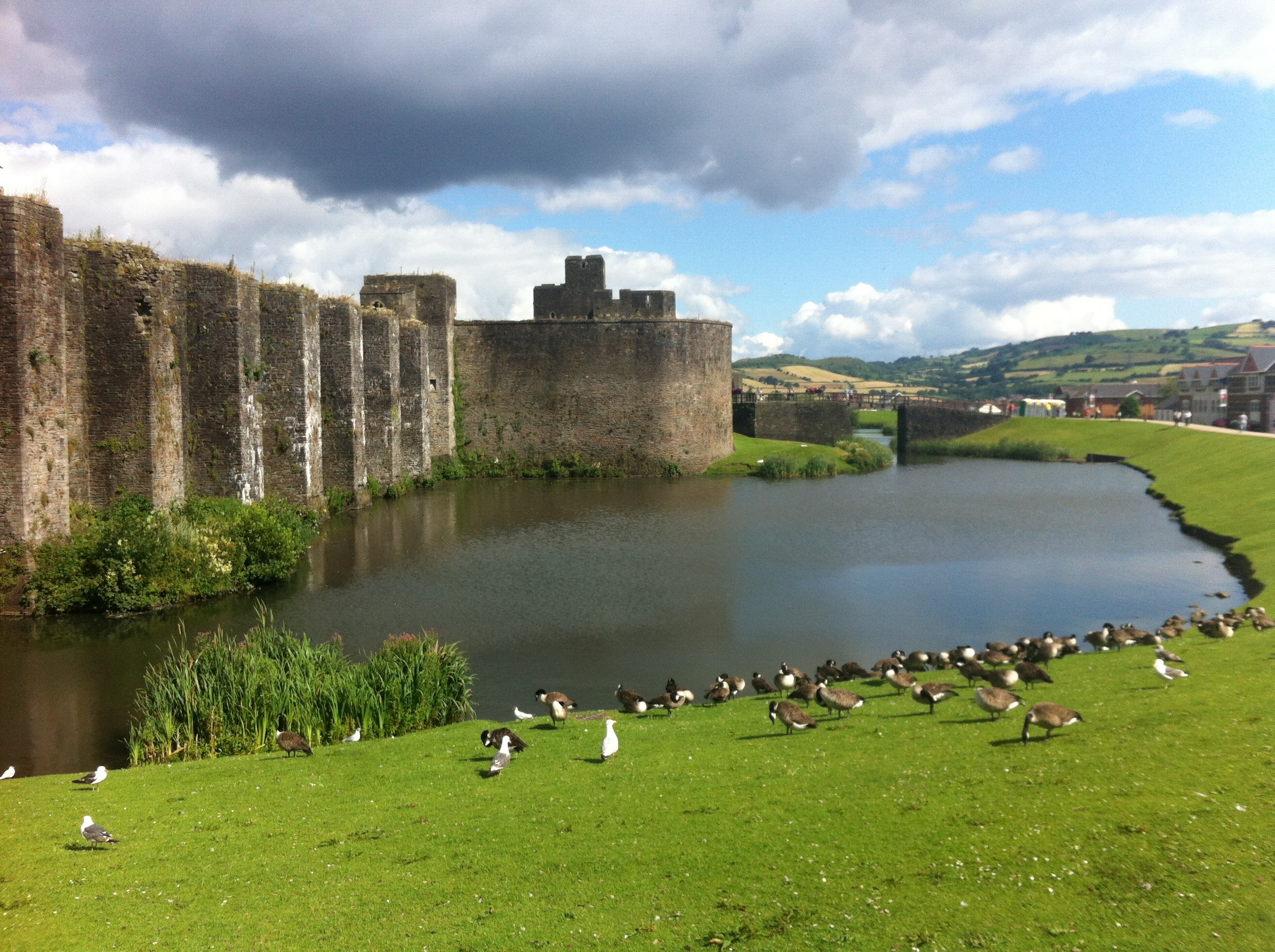
Castle and moat; 2013

The original town of Caerphilly grew up as a small settlement established just south of the castle by Gilbert de Clare. After the death of de Clare at the battle of Bannockburn in 1314, Edward II became guardian of de Clare's three sisters and heiresses. In 1315 he replaced de Badlesmere with a new English administrator, Payn de Turberville of Coity, who persecuted the people of Glamorgan. Then, like many in northern Europe at the time, the region was in the throes of a serious famine. In coming to the defence of his people, Llywelyn Bren, the great-grandson of Ifor Bach and Welsh Lord of Senghenydd, incurred the wrath of de Turberville, who charged him with sedition. Llywelyn appealed to Edward II to call off or control his self-interested agent, but Edward ordered Llywelyn to appear before Parliament to face the charge of treason. The King promised Llywelyn that if the charges were found true, he would be hanged. Llywelyn fled and prepared for war. On 28 January 1316, Llywelyn began the revolt with a surprise attack on Caerphilly Castle. He captured the constable outside the castle and the outer ward, but could not break into the inner defences. His forces burned the town, slaughtered some of its inhabitants and started a siege. The town was rebuilt but remained very small throughout the Middle Ages. The first evidence of its emerging importance was the construction of a court house in the 14th century, the only pre-19th-century building, apart from the castle, that remains in the town.

At the beginning of the 15th century the castle was again attacked, this time by Owain Glyndŵr, who took control of it around 1403–5. Repairs to the castle continued until at least 1430, but just a century later the antiquary John Leland recorded that the castle was a ruin set in marshland, with a single tower being used as a prison. In the mid-16th century the 2nd Earl of Pembroke used the castle as a manorial court, but in 1583 the castle was leased to Thomas Lewis, who accelerated its dilapidation by removing stonework to build his nearby manor, the Van. The Lewis family, who claimed descent from Ifor Bach, left the manor in the mid-18th century when they purchased St Fagans Castle, the Van falling into decay.

During the 1700s, Caerphilly began to grow into a market town, and in the 19th century, as the South Wales Valleys underwent massive growth through industrialisation, the town's population grew. Caerphilly railway station was opened in 1871, and in 1899 the Rhymney Railway built its Caerphilly railway works maintenance facilities; however, the expansion of the population in the 19th century was more to do with the increasing market for coal.

== Governance ==
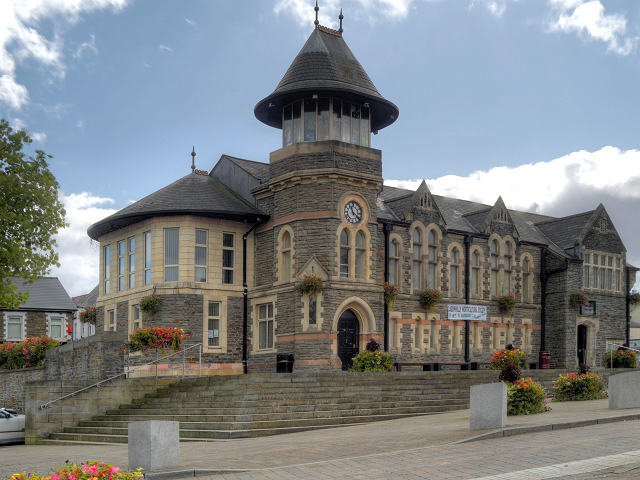
Twyn Community Centre, a converted church which serves as the town council's offices and meeting place

There are two tiers of local government covering Caerphilly: Caerphilly Town Council at community level and Caerphilly County Borough Council at borough level. The town council is based at the Twyn Community Centre. The borough is named after Caerphilly, but covers a much larger area. The county borough council's main offices are not in the town of Caerphilly itself, but in the more central location of Ystrad Mynach.

Historically, Caerphilly formed part of the ancient parish of Eglwysilan in the county of Glamorgan. A local board was established to provide local government for Caerphilly in 1893, covering the two parishes of Eglwysilan and Llanfabon. The district covered by the board included a substantial area to the west and north-west of the town itself, extending to Taff's Well, Nelson and the southern part of Ystrad Mynach. In 1894, local boards were reconstituted as urban districts.

Caerphilly Urban District Council governed the area from 1894 until 1974. It established its headquarters at a converted house called Bron Rhiw on Mountain Road. The urban district was abolished in 1974, with the majority of the area becoming part of Rhymney Valley District in the new county of Mid Glamorgan, except for the Taff's Well ward which went instead to Taff-Ely. A Caerphilly community was established at the same time, being a lower-tier authority, initially covering that part of the former urban district within Rhymney Valley. The community was divided in 1985, with separate communities being created for Aber Valley, Llanbradach, Nelson, and Penyhreol, and transferring the part of Ystrad Mynach which had been in the Caerphilly community to the Gelligaer community. This left the reduced Caerphilly community just covering the town itself. Further local government reorganisation in 1996 saw the abolition of Mid Glamorgan County Council, and Rhymney Valley merged with neighbouring Islwyn borough to become the Caerphilly County Borough.

== Culture ==
Caerphilly is featured in the Sex Pistols documentary The Filth and the Fury. Protests and a prayer meeting were held outside the Castle Cinema on the evening of 14 December 1976, when the group were playing a concert there. However, Caerphilly was one of the few councils that would allow the group to perform (Leeds and Manchester being the others). Caerphilly Castle was used as a filming location for Merlin and the Doctor Who episodes The Rebel Flesh and The Almost People (2011).

Caerphilly hosted the National Eisteddfod in 1950.

There are a number of notable figures who grew up in Caerphilly. They include comedian Tommy Cooper and the footballers David Pipe, Aaron Ramsey and Robert Earnshaw, whose family relocated to the town from Zambia.

The town has a rugby union club, Caerphilly RFC, who play in League Two East Central of the WRU National League.

Caerphilly also has its own angling club named Caerphilly & District Angling Association which was founded in the late 1940's.

The town is known outside Wales for Caerphilly cheese and has hosted two food fairs, the Caerphilly Food Festival, which is held on the streets of the town, and the Big Cheese Festival, which has been held in and around Caerphilly Castle every summer since 1998. Visitor numbers reached 80,000 in 2012. The event includes a wide variety of cheese stalls as well as a funfair, fireworks and a cheese race around the castle.

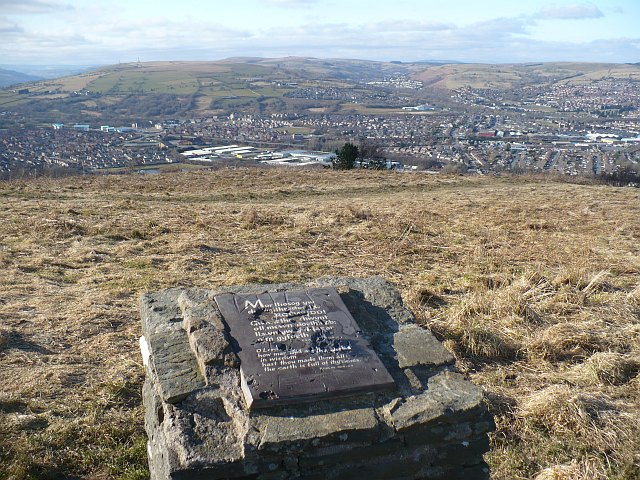
Plaque on Caerphilly Common Looking north-west from the top of Caerphilly Common towards Mynydd Meio ST1188

Caerphilly hosts a fundraising musical event called Megaday. In the Winter there is also the Festival of Light, which involves the procession of hundreds of lanterns through the centre of the town.

In 2012, Caerphilly County's only art gallery, Y Galeri, opened in St Fagan's Street in the town centre. It was part of plans to build a wider arts centre with exhibitions, workshops and talks.

In 2015, Caerphilly-born writer Thomas Morris published a short story collection, We Don't Know What We're Doing, which is set in Caerphilly. The book won the 2016 Wales Book of the Year and a Somerset Maugham Award.

== Caerphilly Heart Disease Study ==
The Caerphilly Heart Disease Study (also known as the Caerphilly Prospective Study) is one of the world's longest running epidemiology studies. Since 1979, a representative sample of adult males born between 1918 and 1938, living in Caerphilly and the surrounding villages of Abertridwr, Bedwas, Machen, Senghenydd and Trethomas, have participated in the study. A wide range of health and lifestyle data have been collected throughout the study and have been the basis for over 400 publications in the medical press. A notable report was on the reductions in vascular disease, diabetes, cognitive impairment and dementia attributable to a healthy lifestyle.

== Transport ==
=== Aviation ===
The nearest airport is Cardiff Airport which is 19 miles (31 km) away by road, it is a 35-minute drive and about an hour by train and shuttle bus.

Bristol Airport is 47 miles (76 km) away by road.

=== Rail ===
Caerphilly has three railway stations. All are located on the Rhymney Line serving Cardiff.

- Caerphilly at the southern end of the town near the shopping area
- Aber in the western part of the town
- Energlyn & Churchill Park railway station in the far western part of the town

The rail service between Caerphilly and Cardiff Queen Street typically takes 13 minutes. From there services continue to Penarth, Cardiff Central, or on occasion Bridgend (Via Rhoose Cardiff International Airport).

=== Road ===
The A469 trunk road runs through the town north to south and connects the north to the Heads of the Valleys Road and the South to the A48 Gabalfa Interchange. The A468 skirts the northern boundary of the town connecting the west with the A470 and the east with the M4 Motorway European route E30 at junction 28.

=== Bus ===
Caerphilly has a wide variety of bus services all stopping at Caerphilly Interchange which is integrated with rail services at Caerphilly Railway Station. Services are operated by Stagecoach, Harris Coaches and Connect2

Almost all services to Cardiff, Newport, Blackwood, Pontypridd, Ystrad Mynach and Bargoed are operated by Stagecoach. There are also many local services to Senghenydd, Bedwas, and Llanbradach. A community bus service called Connect2 is also operated by Caerphilly Council which serves Draethen, Blackwood, Nelson, Trapwell, Manmoel Bryncenydd and Glenfields Estate.

==== Traditional buses ====
Caerphilly Urban District Council (UDC) had its own fleet of buses, which began operating in 1920 although powers to operate them had been obtained by the UDC in 1917. In 1974, this fleet was amalgamated with those of Bedwas and Machen UDC and of Gelligaer UDC to create the bus fleet of Rhymney Valley District Council. The fleet persists today as a heritage operation.

=== Metro ===
The South Wales Metro is a system integrating heavy rail, light rail and bus services in South East Wales around the hub of Cardiff Central. The first phase was approved for development in October 2013. Work has begun and the Core Valley lines (including Rhymney line) are to be electrified. New trains will be introduced (British Rail Class 756), Increasing capacity, more frequent services and greener transport for the town and the local region. Caerphilly will also benefit from new greener buses which will also be integrated into the system. The Metro should be completed by late 2023 early 2024.

== Notable people ==
See also: Category:People from Caerphilly

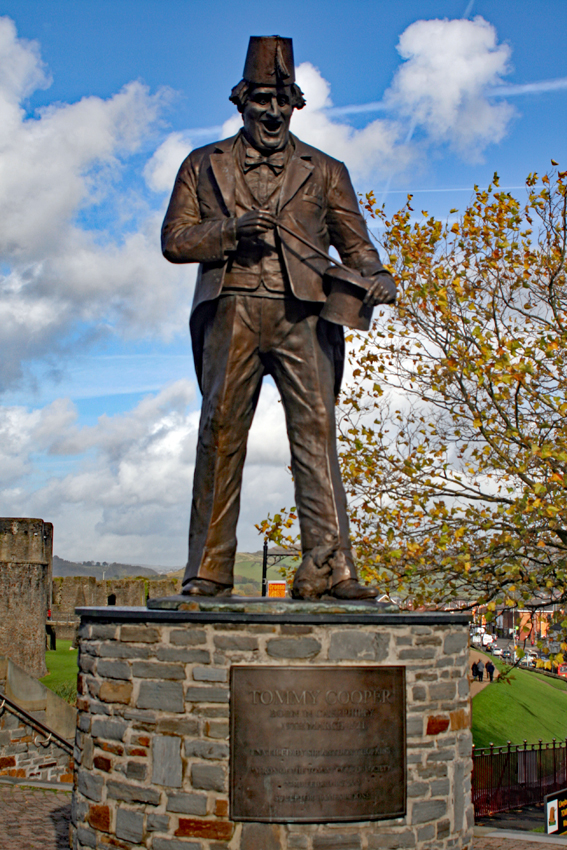
Statue of Tommy Cooper

- Norrie Alden (1909–1980), footballer
- Donald Braithwaite (1936–2017), former professional boxer, Bronze medalist at the 1958 British Empire and Commonwealth Games
- Margaret Bevan (c. 1894-1953), girl evangelist
- Manon Carpenter (born 1993), mountain bike world champion
- Tommy Cooper (1921–1984), comedian and magician; he has a commemorative statue in the Twyn area
- Daniel and Laura Curtis, composers
- Amy Dowden (born 1990), professional dancer.
- Sian Evans (born 1971), singer-songwriter of the band Kosheen
- Sam Fenwick (born 1992), squash player
- Delyth Jewell (born 1987 or 1988), politician
- Matt Johnson (born 1982), TV presenter
- Roger Lewis (born 1960), journalist, writer and biographer, author of The Life and Death of Peter Sellers
- Aaron Ramsey (born 1990), professional footballer
- Craig Roberts (born 1991), actor and director from Maesycwmmer, Caerphilly
- Eirlys Roberts (1911–2008), consumer advocate and campaigner
- Malcolm Uphill (1935–1999), professional motorcycle racer
- Leona Vaughan (born 1995), actress

== Bibliography ==
- Davies, John; Jenkins, Nigel; Menna, Baines; Lynch, Peredur I., eds. (2008). The Welsh Academy Encyclopaedia of Wales. Cardiff: University of Wales Press. ISBN 978-0-7083-1953-6.
- Evans, C.J.O. (1948). Glamorgan, its History and Topography. Cardiff: William Lewis.
- Newman, John (1995). Glamorgan. London: Penguin Group. ISBN 0-14-071056-6.
- Witton, Alan M., ed. (September 1976). Fleetbook 9: Buses of South Wales. Manchester: A.M. Witton. ISBN 0-86047-091-1.
