= List of communities in Caerphilly County Borough =

The communities of Caerphilly County Borough in 2024.

Caerphilly County Borough is a county borough in the south-east of Wales. It is one of the 22 principal areas of Wales.

Communities are the lowest tier of local government in Wales. Unlike English counties, which often contain unparished areas, all Welsh principal areas are entirely divided into communities.

There are 27 communities in Caerphilly County Borough, with Newbridge being the largest and Gelligaer the most populated. 18 of them have a community council, with four calling themselves town councils in Bargoed, Blackwood, Caerphilly and Risca West.

== List of communities in Caerphilly County Borough ==
Community		Population (2011)	Area (km^{2}, 2011)	Pre-1974 district	Remarks	Refs	Location map
English	Welsh	Population (2011)	Area (km^{2}, 2011)	Pre-1974 district	Remarks	Refs	Location map
Abercarn	Aber-carn	5,352	16.5	Abercarn Urban District	Community without council. Includes Cwmcarn.		
Aber Valley	Cwm Aber	6,799	13.32	Caerphilly Urban District	Includes Abertridwr, Eglwysilan and Senghenydd.		
Argoed	Argoed	2,769	15.67	Bedwellty Urban District	Includes Hollybush and Markham.		
Bargoed	Bargoed	11,900	7.14	Bedwellty and Gelligaer Urban Districts	Town. Includes Aberbargoed and Gilfach.		
Bedwas, Trethomas and Machen	Bedwas, Tretomos a Machen	10,758	18.33	Bedwas and Machen Urban District	Includes Bedwas, Graig-y-Rhacca, Machen and Trethomas.		
Blackwood	Coed-duon	8,496	4.23	Bedwellty Urban District	Town.		
Caerphilly	Caerffili	15,214	9.68	Caerphilly Urban District	Town.		
Cefn Fforest	Cefn Fforest	3,894	0.69	Bedwellty Urban District	Community without council.		
Crosskeys	Pont-y-cymer	3,265	5.73	Risca Urban District	Community without council.		
Crumlin	Crymlyn	5,947	12.97	Abercarn Urban District	Community without council. Includes Croespenmaen, Hafodyrynys and Trinant.		
Darran Valley	Cwm Darran	2,607	19.67	Gelligaer Urban District	Includes Deri and Fochriw.		
Draethen, Waterloo and Rudry	Draethen, Waterloo a Rhydri	1,053	23.45	Cardiff Rural District	Called Rudry until 2010. Includes Cefn Mably, Draethen, Rudry and Waterloo.		
Gelligaer	Gelli-gaer	18,408	20.39	Gelligaer Urban District	Includes Cefn Hengoed, Hengoed, Penpedairheol, Penybryn and Ystrad Mynach.		
Llanbradach and Pwllypant	Llanbradach a Phwll-y-pant	4,383	5.93	Caerphilly Urban District	Includes Llanbradach and Pwllypant.		
Maesycwmmer	Maesycwmer	2,242	7.52	Bedwas and Machen Urban District			
Nelson	Ffos Y Gerddinen	4,647	10.99	Caerphilly Urban District	Includes Llanvabon.		
Newbridge	Trecelyn	6,509	10,37	Abercarn Urban District	Community without council.		
New Tredegar	Tredegar Newydd	4,966	9.64	Bedwellty Urban District	Includes Brithdir and Tir-Phil.		
Pengam	Pengam	3,848	2.31	Bedwellty Urban District	Community without council.		
Penmaen	Penmaen	5,251	4,79	Mynyddislwyn Urban District	Community without council. Includes Oakdale.		
Penyrheol, Trecenydd and Energlyn	Penyrheol, Trecenydd ac Enau'r Glyn	12,537	5.61	Caerphilly Urban District	Includes Energlyn, Penyrheol and Trecenydd.		
Pontllanfraith	Pontllanfraith	8,552	5.75	Mynyddislwyn Urban District	Community without council.		
Rhymney	Rhymni	8,845	21.58	Rhymney Urban District	Includes Abertysswg, Bute Town and Pontlottyn.		
Risca East	Dwyrain Rhisga	6,464	2.75	Risca Urban District	Created in 2010. Includes part of Risca.		
Risca West	Gorllewin Rhisga	5,229	5.14	Risca Urban District	Town. Created in 2010. Includes Pontymister and part of Risca.		
Van	Y Fan	4,923	3.12	Cardiff Rural District	Includes Castle Park, Lansbury Park and Mornington Meadows.		
Ynysddu	Ynys-ddu	3,948	14.18	Mynyddislwyn Urban District	Community without council. Includes Cwmfelinfach, Wattsville and Wyllie.		
