= List of places in Caerphilly County Borough =

Map of places in Caerphilly County Borough compiled from this list
See the list of places in Wales for places in other principal areas.

This is a list of towns and villages in the Caerphilly County Borough, Wales.

== A ==
- Aberbargoed
- Abercarn
- Abertridwr, Caerphilly
- Abertysswg
- Argoed

== B ==
- Bargoed
- Bedwas
- Bedwellty
- Blackwood
- Blaen-carno
- Bont Pren
- Britannia
- Brithdir
- Bryn
- Bryncenydd
- Bute Town

== C ==
- Caerphilly
- Caledfryn
- Castle Park
- Cefn Fforest
- Cefn Hengoed
- Cefn Mably
- Chapel of Ease
- Churchill Park
- Croespenmaen
- Crosskeys
- Crumlin
- Cwmbargoed
- Cwmcarn
- Cwmgelli
- Cwmfelinfach
- Cwmsyfiog
- Cwmnantygwynt

== D ==
- Deri
- Draethen

== E ==
- Eglwysilan
- Elliotstown
- Energlyn

== F ==
- Fernlea
- Fleur-de-lis
- Fochriw

== G ==
- Gellihaf
- Gelligaer
- Gelligroes
- Gilfach
- Gilfach Estate
- Glan-y-nant
- Graig-y-Rhacca
- Groes-faen

== H ==
- Hafodyrynys
- Hendredenny
- Hengoed
- Hollybush

== L ==
- Lansbury Park
- Llanbradach
- Llanfabon
- Llanfach
- Llechryd
- Llwyn Gwyn

== M ==
- Machen
- Maesycwmmer
- Manmoel
- Markham
- Mornington Meadows
- Mynyddislwyn

== N ==
- Nelson
- Newbridge
- New Tredegar

== O ==
- Oakdale
- Ochrwyth, Risca

== P ==
- Pantside
- Pantyresk
- Penallta
- Pengam
- Penllwyn
- Penmaen
- Penpedairheol, Caerphilly
- Pentwyn (near Fochriw)
- Pentwyn (near Penyrheol)
- Pentwyn (near Trinant)
- Pentwynmawr
- Penybryn
- Penyfan
- Penyrheol
- Phillipstown, Caerphilly
- Pontllanfraith
- Pontlottyn
- Pontymister
- Pontywaun
- Princetown
- Pwllypant

== R ==
- Rhymney
- Rhymney Bridge
- Risca
- Rudry
- Ruperra

== S ==
- Senghenydd
- Springfield

== T ==
- Tir-Phil
- Tir-y-berth
- Trecenydd
- Tredomen
- Treowen, Caerphilly
- Trethomas
- Trinant
- Troedrhiwfwch
- Ty Sign

== V ==
- Van, Caerphilly

== W ==
- Waterloo
- Watford, Caerphilly
- Wattsville
- West End
- Wernddu
- Woodfieldside
- Wyllie

== Y ==
- Ynysddu
- Ystrad Mynach

== See also ==
- List of communities in Caerphilly County Borough
- List of standardised Welsh place-names in Caerphilly County Borough
