= List of standardised Welsh place-names in Caerphilly County Borough =

Location of Caerphilly County Borough in Wales.

The list of standardised Welsh place-names, for places in Caerphilly County Borough, is a list compiled by the Welsh Language Commissioner to recommend the standardisation of the spelling of Welsh place-names, particularly in the Welsh language and when multiple forms are used, although some place-names in English were also recommended to be matched with the Welsh. The list contains 133 entries, as of November 2023.

The list is based on recommendations provided by the Place-names Standardisation Panel, convened by the Commissioner, for expert advice on the standardisation of Welsh place-names. The panel bases their decisions on a set of guidelines (currently dating to June 2023), specific to Welsh settlement names (such as those of villages, towns, and cities) and topographic features (such as lakes, mountains and rivers). The panel does not cover house or building names, although similar principles could be applied to them or to names for new developments (for which the Commissioner offers their own advice to local authorities and housing developers). The panel may also have used additional guidelines.

The list was first published in 2018, and took years to put together. Upon creation, these lists were published under the Open Government Licence 3.0.

== List ==
Recommended standardised names		Not recommended names		Type	Grid reference
Welsh	English	Welsh	English	Type	Grid reference
Aberbargod	Aberbargoed	Aberbargoed		Settlement	SO1500
Aber-carn	Aber-carn		Abercarn	Settlement	ST2194
Abertridwr	Abertridwr			Settlement	ST1289
Abertyswg	Abertyswg		Abertysswg	Settlement	SO1305
Argoed	Argoed			Settlement	SO1700
Bargod	Bargoed	Bargoed		Settlement	ST1499
Bedwas	Bedwas			Settlement	ST1789
Bedwellte	Bedwellty			Settlement	SO1600
Berllangollen	Berllangollen			Settlement	ST1986
Black Vein	Black Vein			Settlement	ST2291
Blaencarno	Blaencarno			Settlement	SO0908
Blaenrhymni	Blaenrhymni			Area	SO1010
Britannia	Britannia			Settlement	ST1698
Brithdir	Brithdir			Settlement	SO1501
Bryn	Bryn			Settlement	ST1695
Brynawel	Brynawel			Settlement	ST1991
Caerffili	Caerphilly			Settlement	ST1586
Cefn Fforest	Cefn Fforest			Settlement	ST1697
Cefn Hengoed	Cefn Hengoed			Settlement	ST1495
Cefn Mabli	Cefn Mably			Settlement	ST2284
Cefn-y-pant	Pantside			Settlement	ST2197
Celynnen	Celynnen			Settlement	ST2195
Chapel of Ease	Chapel of Ease			Settlement	ST2295
Chatham	Chatham			Settlement	ST2189
Coed-duon	Blackwood			Settlement	ST1797
Coed-y-brain	Coed-y-brain			Settlement	SO1500
Croespenmaen	Croespenmaen			Settlement	ST1998
Crosskeys	Crosskeys			Settlement	ST2291
Crymlyn	Crumlin			Settlement	ST2198
Cwm-carn	Cwm-carn		Cwmcarn	Settlement	ST2193
Cwmcorrwg	Cwmcorrwg			Settlement	ST1799
Cwmfelin-fach	Cwmfelin-fach		Cwmfelinfach	Settlement	ST1891
Cwmgelli	Cwmgelli			Settlement	ST1798
Cwm-nant-gwynt	Cwm-nant-gwynt			Settlement	SO2001
Cwmnantyrodyn	Cwmnantyrodyn			Settlement	ST1895
Cwmsyfïog	Cwmsyfïog			Settlement	SO1502
Dan-y-graig	Dan-y-graig			Settlement	ST2390
Deri	Deri			Settlement	SO1201
Draethen	Draethen			Settlement	ST2287
Y Drenewydd	Bute Town			Settlement	SO1009
Eglwysilan	Eglwysilan			Settlement	ST1288
Eneu'r-glyn	Energlyn			Settlement	ST1488
Y Fan	Van			Settlement	ST1686
Fernlea	Fernlea			Settlement	ST2491
Fochriw	Fochriw			Settlement	SO1005
Gelli-gaer	Gelli-gaer		Gelligaer	Settlement	ST1396
Gelli-groes	Gelli-groes			Settlement	ST1794
Gelli-haf	Gelli-haf			Settlement	ST1695
Gilfach	Gilfach			Settlement	ST1598
Glan-y-nant	Glan-y-nant			Settlement	ST1497
Glyn-gaer	Glyn-gaer			Settlement	ST1497
Graig-y-rhaca	Graig-y-rhaca		Graig-y-Rhacca	Settlement	ST1989
Groes-faen	Groes-faen			Settlement	SO1300
Groes-wen	Groes-wen			Settlement	ST1286
Gwrhay	Gwrhay			Settlement	ST1899
Hafodyrynys	Hafodyrynys			Settlement	ST2299
Hendredenny	Hendredenny			Settlement	ST1387
Hengoed	Hengoed			Settlement	ST1495
Heol-ddu	Heol-ddu			Settlement	ST1499
Heol-ddu Uchaf	Heol-ddu Uchaf			Settlement	ST1499
Kendon	Kendon			Settlement	ST1998
Llanbradach	Llanbradach			Settlement	ST1490
Llancaeach	Llancaeach		Llancaiach	Settlement	ST1196
Llanfabon	Llanfabon		Llanvabon	Settlement	ST1093
Llan-fach	Llan-fach			Settlement	ST2295
Llechryd	Llechryd			Settlement	SO1009
Llwyncelyn	Hollybush			Settlement	SO1603
Machen	Machen			Settlement	ST2189
Maes-y-coed	Woodfieldside			Settlement	ST1796
Maesycwmwr	Maesycwmer			Settlement	ST1594
Maesyffynnon	Springfield			Settlement	ST1895
Man-moel	Man-moel			Settlement	SO1703
Markham	Markham			Settlement	SO1601
Mynyddislwyn	Mynyddislwyn			Settlement	ST1994
Nantyceisiad	Nantyceisiad			Settlement	ST2089
Nelson	Nelson			Settlement	ST1195
Oakdale	Oakdale			Settlement	ST1898
Ochrwyth	Ochrwyth			Settlement	ST2389
Parc Hendredenny	Hendredenny Park			Settlement	ST1387
Parc Lansbury	Lansbury Park			Settlement	ST1687
Parc Mawr	Parc Mawr			Settlement	ST1191
Parc Watford	Watford Park			Settlement	ST1486
Penallta	Penallta			Settlement	ST1395
Pengam	Pengam			Settlement	ST1597
Penllwyn	Penllwyn			Settlement	ST1795
Penmaen	Penmaen			Settlement	ST1897
Penpedairheol	Penpedairheol			Settlement	ST1497
Pen-rhiw	Pen-rhiw			Settlement	ST2491
Pentrapiod	Pentrapiod			Settlement	SO1901
Pentref-y-groes	Pentref-y-groes			Settlement	ST1998
Pen-twyn	Pen-twyn			Settlement	SO1004
Pen-twyn	Pen-twyn			Settlement	SO2000
Pentwyn-mawr	Pentwyn-mawr			Settlement	ST1996
Pen-y-banc	Pen-y-banc			Settlement	SO1103
Pen-y-bryn	Pen-y-bryn			Settlement	ST1396
Pen-y-fan	Pen-y-fan			Settlement	SO1900
Penyrheol	Penyrheol			Settlement	ST1488
Phillipstown	Phillipstown			Settlement	SO1403
Pontllan-fraith	Pontllan-fraith		Pontllanfraith	Settlement	ST1896
Pontlotyn	Pontlotyn		Pontlottyn	Settlement	SO1106
Pontymister	Pontymister			Settlement	ST2490
Pont-y-waun	Pont-y-waun			Settlement	ST2292
Princetown	Princetown			Settlement	SO1109
Pwll-y-pant	Pwll-y-pant			Settlement	ST1588
Rhisga	Risca			Settlement	ST2490
Rhiw	Rhiw			Settlement	ST2098
Rhiw'r-perrai	Ruperra			Settlement	ST2286
Rhydri	Rudry			Settlement	ST1986
Rhymni	Rhymney			Settlement	SO1107
Senghenydd	Senghenydd			Settlement	ST1190
Tai'rheol	Tai'rheol			Settlement	ST1094
Tir-phil	Tir-phil		Tir-Phil	Settlement	SO1303
Tir-y-berth	Tir-y-berth			Settlement	ST1596
Tonypistyll	Tonypistyll			Settlement	ST1996
Trecelyn	Newbridge			Settlement	ST2197
Trecenydd	Trecenydd			Settlement	ST1487
Tredegar Newydd	New Tredegar			Settlement	SO1403
Tredomen	Tredomen			Settlement	ST1394
Tref Elliot	Elliot's Town			Settlement	SO1402
Trelyn	Fleur-de-lis			Settlement	ST1596
Treowen	Treowen			Settlement	ST2098
Trethomas	Trethomas			Settlement	ST1888
Trinant	Trinant			Settlement	ST2099
Troedrhiw'r-fuwch	Troedrhiw'r-fuwch			Settlement	SO1304
Tŷ Sign	Tŷ Sign			Settlement	ST2490
Ty'n-y-coedcae	Waterloo			Settlement	ST1988
Wattsville	Wattsville			Settlement	ST2091
Wern-ddu	Wern-ddu			Area	ST1785
West End	West End			Settlement	ST2195
Wyllie	Wyllie			Settlement	ST1794
Y Graig	The Rock			Settlement	ST1798
Ynys-ddu	Ynys-ddu		Ynysddu	Settlement	ST1792
Ystrad Mynach	Ystrad Mynach			Settlement	ST1494
