= List of public art in Caerphilly County Borough =

Map of Wales with Caerphilly County Borough highlighted

This is a list of public art in Caerphilly County Borough, a county borough in south Wales, that sits across the ancient county boundary between Glamorgan and Monmouthshire. It is governed by the Caerphilly County Borough Council. This list applies only to works of public art on permanent display in an outdoor public space and does not, for example, include artworks in museums.

== Aberbargoed ==
Image	Title / subject	Location and coordinates	Date	Artist / designer	Type	Material	Dimensions	Designation	Wikidata	Notes
More images	War memorial	Aberbargoed	c.1925		Memorial gates and plaques	Cast metal		Grade II	Q29503375	

== Bargoed ==
Image	Title / subject	Location and coordinates	Date	Artist / designer	Type	Material	Dimensions	Designation	Wikidata	Notes
	War memorial	Garden of St Gwladys Church, Bargoed	1923		Statue on pedestal	Granite and stone		Grade II		Relocated to current location in 2002.
	Capel Gwladys cross	Bargoed			Celtic cross	Stone				Marks the location of Capel Gwladys, a 5th century Christian site.

== Bedwas ==
Image	Title / subject	Location and coordinates	Date	Artist / designer	Type	Material	Dimensions	Designation	Wikidata	Notes
	War memorial	Newport Road, Bedwas	1923		Pillar	Marble	2.6m tall	Grade II	Q29498644	

== Blackwood ==
Image	Title / subject	Location and coordinates	Date	Artist / designer	Type	Material	Dimensions	Designation	Wikidata	Notes
	War memorial	Blackwood	1926		Cenotaph	Granite and limestone		Grade II	Q29503571	
	Chartist	Blackwood			Statue	Metal				

== Brithdir ==
Image	Title / subject	Location and coordinates	Date	Artist / designer	Type	Material	Dimensions	Designation	Wikidata	Notes
	War memorial	Brithdir			Cenotaph	Stone				

== Caerphilly ==
Image	Title / subject	Location and coordinates	Date	Artist / designer	Type	Material	Dimensions	Designation	Wikidata	Notes
More images	David Williams	Caerphilly	1911		Obelisk with relief plaque	Marble and bronze		Grade II	Q29498707	
More images	War memorial	Castle Street, Caerphilly	1922	Lewis Williams (designer), CD Jones (sculptor)	Cenotaph	Portland stone		Grade II	Q29498708	
More images	Tommy Cooper	Caerphilly	2008	James Done	Statue on pedestal	Bronze and granite	2.7m tall			
	Canadian Spitfire pilot memorial	Caerphilly Mountain	2015		Replica Spitfire proplellor and plaque					

== Cwmcarn ==
Image	Title / subject	Location and coordinates	Date	Artist / designer	Type	Material	Dimensions	Designation	Wikidata	Notes
	War memorial	Memorial Park, Cwmcarn	1922		Statue on column	Bronze and stone		Grade II		

== Llanbradach ==
Image	Title / subject	Location and coordinates	Date	Artist / designer	Type	Material	Dimensions	Designation	Wikidata	Notes
	War memorial	Park View, Llanbradach			Statue on column	Marble and Portland stone		Grade II	Q29499348	

== Machen ==
Image	Title / subject	Location and coordinates	Date	Artist / designer	Type	Material	Dimensions	Designation	Wikidata	Notes
	War memorial	Commercial Road, Machen	1921		Celtic cross	Granite	1.9m tall	Grade II	Q29498640	

== Nelson ==
Image	Title / subject	Location and coordinates	Date	Artist / designer	Type	Material	Dimensions	Designation	Wikidata	Notes
	War memorial	Nelson	1926		Cenotaph	Granite		Grade II	Q29501815	

== Newbridge ==
Image	Title / subject	Location and coordinates	Date	Artist / designer	Type	Material	Dimensions	Designation	Wikidata	Notes
	War memorial	Newbridge	1995		Plaques	Bronze				Replaced an earlier memorial now in the St Fagans National Museum of History

== New Tredegar ==
Image	Title / subject	Location and coordinates	Date	Artist / designer	Type	Material	Dimensions	Designation	Wikidata	Notes
	War memorial	White Rose Way, New Tredegar	1923	Attributed to Louis Frederick Roslyn	Statue group on pedestal	Marble and red granite		Grade II	Q29502441	

== Oakdale ==
Image	Title / subject	Location and coordinates	Date	Artist / designer	Type	Material	Dimensions	Designation	Wikidata	Notes
	Oakdale Colliery memorial	Oakdale, Caerphilly			Sculpture	Metal and stone				

== Pontllanfraith ==
Image	Title / subject	Location and coordinates	Date	Artist / designer	Type	Material	Dimensions	Designation	Wikidata	Notes
	War memorial	Council Office grounds, Pontllanfraith	c.1920s		Cenotaph	Granite		Grade II	Q29498934	

== Pontlottyn ==
Image	Title / subject	Location and coordinates	Date	Artist / designer	Type	Material	Dimensions	Designation	Wikidata	Notes
	War memorial	Memorial Garden, Pontlottyn	c.1920s		Celtic cross with plaque	Stone				

== Rhymney ==
Image	Title / subject	Location and coordinates	Date	Artist / designer	Type	Material	Dimensions	Designation	Wikidata	Notes
	Bells of Rhymney	Rhymney	2008	Andrew Rowe	Sculpture	painted metal	3m tall			After a poem by Idris Davies
	Twisted Chimney	Bute Town	2010	Brian Tolle	Sculpture	steel, marine plywood, styrofoam	8m tall		Q124658400	
	War memorial	Rhymney	1929	E.A. Gilbert	Celtic cross	Granite	5m tall	Grade II	Q29502139	

== Risca ==
Image	Title / subject	Location and coordinates	Date	Artist / designer	Type	Material	Dimensions	Designation	Wikidata	Notes
	Jubilee memorial	Tredegar Grounds, Risca	c.1890s	W Macfarlane & Co, Glasgow	Statue on pedestal	Bronze		Grade II	Q29499706	
More images	War memorial	Risca	c.1920s		Pillar with circle cross	Granite				
	Grammar School war memorial	Corner of Station Road and Commercial Street, Risca	c.1920s		Celtic cross	Stone				In current position since 2011

== Rudry ==
Image	Title / subject	Location and coordinates	Date	Artist / designer	Type	Material	Dimensions	Designation	Wikidata	Notes
More images	War memorial	Churchyard of St James, Rudry			Celtic cross	Granite		Grade II	Q29498768	

== Senghenydd ==
Image	Title / subject	Location and coordinates	Date	Artist / designer	Type	Material	Dimensions	Designation	Wikidata	Notes
	War memorial	Senghenydd	1921		Clock tower	Granite		Grade II	Q29499211	

== Tir-Phil ==
Image	Title / subject	Location and coordinates	Date	Artist / designer	Type	Material	Dimensions	Designation	Wikidata	Notes
	War memorial	Tir-Phil			Clock tower	Stone				Includes elements from an earlier, now demolished, memorial.

== Tir-y-berth ==
Image	Title / subject	Location and coordinates	Date	Artist / designer	Type	Material	Dimensions	Designation	Wikidata	Notes
	War memorial	West Side New Road, Tir-y-berth			Cross	Stone				

== Troedrhiwfuwch ==
Image	Title / subject	Location and coordinates	Date	Artist / designer	Type	Material	Dimensions	Designation	Wikidata	Notes
	War memorial	Troedrhiwfuwch			Celtic cross	Stone				Site of a former mining village.

== Ystrad Mynach ==
Image	Title / subject	Location and coordinates	Date	Artist / designer	Type	Material	Dimensions	Designation	Wikidata	Notes
	War memorial	Ystrad Mynach	1927		Cenotaph	Portland stone		Grade II		
