= CF postcode area =

Postcode area within the United Kingdom

Cardiff
- Postcode area
- Location within the United Kingdom
- Coordinates: 51.552°N 3.327°W
- Sovereign state: United Kingdom
- Postcode area: CF
- Postcode area name: Cardiff
- Post towns: 23
- Postcode districts: 46
- Postcode sectors: 203
- Postcodes (live): 23,163
- Postcodes (total): 42,309
- Statistics as at May 2020

The CF postcode area, also known as the Cardiff postcode area, is a group of 46 postcode districts for post towns: Cardiff, Bridgend, Merthyr Tydfil, Caerphilly, Aberdare, Bargoed, Barry, Cowbridge, Dinas Powys, Ferndale, Hengoed, Llantwit Major, Maesteg, Mountain Ash, Penarth, Pentre, Pontyclun, Pontypridd, Porth, Porthcawl, Tonypandy, Treharris and Treorchy in south Wales. The CF postcode area is one of six with a population above 1 million.

== Coverage ==
The approximate coverage of the postcode districts:

Postcode district	Post town	Coverage	Local authority area(s)
CF3	CARDIFF	CARDIFF SOUTH (East): Rumney & Trowbridge, Llanrumney, St Mellons NEWPORT WEST: Castleton, Marshfield	Cardiff, Newport
CF5	CARDIFF	CARDIFF WEST (South): Ely, Caerau, St Fagans, Culverhouse Cross, Canton & Leckwith, Fairwater, Danescourt, Llandaff, Riverside VALE OF GLAMORGAN: Wenvoe, Peterston Super Ely, St Georges super Ely, Michaelston-le-Pit, Michaelston-super-Ely, St Brides-super-Ely	Cardiff, Vale of Glamorgan
CF10	CARDIFF	CARDIFF CENTRAL / CARDIFF SOUTH: CARDIFF CITY CENTRE (part of), Grangetown, CARDIFF BAY (part of) & Butetown	Cardiff
CF11	CARDIFF	CARDIFF CENTRAL / CARDIFF SOUTH: CARDIFF CITY CENTRE (part of), Canton, CARDIFF BAY (part of), Grangetown	Cardiff
CF14	CARDIFF	CARDIFF NORTH (West): Birchgrove, Whitchurch, Thornhill & Lisvane, Rhiwbina & Pantmawr, Gabalfa, Heath, Llandaff North, Llanishen	Cardiff
CF15	CARDIFF	CARDIFF WEST (North): Pentyrch & Gwaelod-y-Garth & Creigiau, Radyr & Morganstown, Tongwynlais RHONDDA CYNON TAFF: Taffs Well & Nantgarw CAERPHILLY: Groeswen	Cardiff, Rhondda Cynon Taf, Caerphilly
CF23	CARDIFF	CARDIFF NORTH (East): Llanishen, Cyncoed, Pentwyn, Penylan, Pontprennau & Old St Mellons	Cardiff
CF24	CARDIFF	CARDIFF CENTRAL: CARDIFF CITY CENTRE (part of) & Cathays, Roath & Plasnewydd, Splott, Adamsdown	Cardiff
CF30	CARDIFF		non-geographic
CF31	BRIDGEND	Bridgend, Brackla, Coity, Pen-y-fai	Bridgend
CF32	BRIDGEND	BRIDGEND: Cefn Cribwr, Laleston, Merthyr Mawr, Nant-y-moel, Ogmore Vale, Tondu, Sarn, Ynysawdre, St Bride's Minor, Pontycymer, Llangeinor, Garw Valley, Blaengarw, Blackmill, Bettws, Aberkenfig VALE OF GLAMORGAN: St Brides Major	Bridgend, Vale of Glamorgan
CF33	BRIDGEND	Cornelly, Pyle	Bridgend
CF34	MAESTEG	Maesteg, Llangynwyd, Caerau, Nantyffyllon	Bridgend
CF35	BRIDGEND	BRIDGEND: PENCOED TOWN, Coychurch, Llangan VALE OF GLAMORGAN: Ewenny	Bridgend, Vale of Glamorgan
CF36	PORTHCAWL	Porthcawl, Nottage, Newton	Bridgend
CF37	PONTYPRIDD	Pontypridd Community: PONTYPRIDD TOWN including Cilfynydd, Glyncoch, Graig, Treforest, Hopkinstown, Trallwng, Maesycoed, Pwllgwaun, Hawthorn, Rhydyfelin, TREHAFOD Ynysybwl Community: YNYSYBWL & Coed-y-Cwm	Rhondda Cynon Taf
CF38	PONTYPRIDD	Llantwit Fardre Community: LLANTWIT FARDRE, CHURCH VILLAGE, Tonteg, Efail Isaf Llantrisant Community (part of): BEDDAU & Ty Nant	Rhondda Cynon Taf
CF39	PORTH	Rhondda Area (RCT): PORTH TOWN & Llwyncelyn, CYMMER & Glynfach & Trebanog, YNYSHIR & Wattstown, Dinas (part of) Taff-Ely Area (RCT): TONYREFAIL TOWN & Coed-Ely & Thomastown, GILFACH GOCH BRIDGEND: Evanstown	Rhondda Cynon Taf, Bridgend
CF40	TONYPANDY	Rhondda Area: TONYPANDY TOWN, TREALAW, PENYGRAIG, Dinas (part of), Williamstown, Cwm Clydach, LLWYNYPIA Taff-Ely Area: Penrhiwfer	Rhondda Cynon Taf
CF41	PENTRE	Pentre, Ton Pentre, Ystrad, Gelli	Rhondda Cynon Taf
CF42	TREORCHY	Treorchy, Cwmparc, Ynyswen, Treherbert, Blaencwm, Blaenrhondda	Rhondda Cynon Taf
CF43	FERNDALE	Ferndale, Blaenllechau, Tylorstown, Penrhys, Pontygwaith, Stanleytown, Maerdy	Rhondda Cynon Taf
CF44	ABERDARE	Aberdare, Cwmaman, Aberaman, Llwydcoed, Cwmbach, Hirwaun, Penywaun, Rhigos, Penderyn, Ystradfellte	Rhondda Cynon Taf, Powys
CF45	MOUNTAIN ASH	Mountain Ash, Abercynon, Penrhiwceiber, Ynysboeth	Rhondda Cynon Taf
CF46	TREHARRIS	Treharris, Quakers Yard, Bedlinog, Nelson	Merthyr Tydfil, Caerphilly
CF47	MERTHYR TYDFIL	Merthyr Tydfil, Gurnos, Penydarren	Merthyr Tydfil
CF48	MERTHYR TYDFIL	Cyfarthfa, Pant, Merthyr Vale, Troed-y-rhiw, Vaynor, Pentrebach	Merthyr Tydfil, Powys
CF61	LLANTWIT MAJOR	Llantwit Major, Llan-maes	Vale of Glamorgan
CF62	BARRY	Barry (west), Rhoose, St Athan, Llancarfan, Barry Island	Vale of Glamorgan
CF63	BARRY	Barry (east), Cadoxton, Barry Docks	Vale of Glamorgan
CF64	PENARTH	Penarth, Sully, Llandough	Vale of Glamorgan
CF64	DINAS POWYS	Dinas Powys	Vale of Glamorgan
CF71	COWBRIDGE	Cowbridge, St Brides Major, Welsh St Donats, Pendoylan, Llandow, Colwinston, Llanblethian, Penllyn, Llanfair	Vale of Glamorgan
CF72	PONTYCLUN	Pontyclun, Llantrisant, Llanharan, Talbot Green, Brynsadler, Miskin, Brynna, Llanharry	Rhondda Cynon Taf
CF81	BARGOED	Bargoed, Aberbargoed, Darran Valley, Gilfach, Pontlottyn	Caerphilly
CF82	HENGOED	Hengoed, Cefn Hengoed, Ystrad Mynach, Gelligaer, Maesycwmmer	Caerphilly
CF83	CAERPHILLY	Caerphilly, Abertridwr, Senghenydd, Bedwas, Trethomas, Machen, Llanbradach, Pwllypant, Penyrheol, Energlyn, Trecenydd, Rudry	Caerphilly
CF91	CARDIFF		non-geographic
CF95	CARDIFF		non-geographic
CF99	CARDIFF		non-geographic

== Map ==
CF postcode area map, showing postcode districts in red and post towns in grey text, with links to nearby LD, NP and SA postcode areas.

== See also ==
- List of postcode areas in the United Kingdom
- Cardiff Mail Centre
- Postcode Address File
