= Draethen, Waterloo and Rudry =

Coordinates: 51.577°N 3.166°W

Draethen, Waterloo and Rudry is a community in the south-west of Caerphilly County Borough, Wales. It comprises the villages of Draethen, Waterloo and Rudry.

The area originally consisted of three separate parishes: Rudry, Rhyd-y-Gwern and Llanfedw. These parishes later merged under the name Rudry and the area became a community in 1974. In 2010, it was renamed to better reflect the area it covers.
