= Penyrheol, Trecenydd and Energlyn =

- Community
- Principal area: Caerphilly
- Country: Wales
- Sovereign state: United Kingdom
- Police: Gwent
- Fire: South Wales
- Ambulance: Welsh
- List of places UK Wales Caerphilly Map of the community

Penyrheol, Trecenydd and Energlyn is a community in Caerphilly county borough, part of the town of Caerphilly, South Wales. It includes the areas of Penyrheol, Trecenydd and Energlyn. At the 2011 census the population of the community was 12,537.
