= St Cenydd Comprehensive School =

Coordinates: 51.581°N 3.240°W

St. Cenydd School

Location
- St. Cenydd School Road; Trecenydd, Caerphilly, CF83 2RP; Wales

Information
- Type: Community School
- Motto: 'Aspire & Achieve'
- Local authority: Caerphilly
- Chair of Governors: Robert Forester
- Headteacher: Rebecca Collins
- Gender: Co-educational
- Age: 11 to 18
- Website: www.stcenyddcommunityschool.co.uk/home

St. Cenydd School is located in Caerphilly, South Wales. Situated in extensive grounds, with panoramic views of the semi-rural Caerphilly basin, St. Cenydd is a popular, mixed, 11-18 community school of over 1,100 pupils.

== Sporting honours ==
St Cenydd Year 11 Rugby squad won the Caerphilly county rugby cup in the 2014–2015 season by defeating local rivals St Martin's comprehensive. It was a hotly contested match with St Cenydd holding onto their lead to win the cup.

George Gasson a former pupil at St Cenydd, is now playing rugby at a high level. He has even been selected in the U-18s and U-20s squad for wales. He currently plays for Newport Gwent Dragons.

Thomas Payne completed a 5 km run in under 30 minutes on his park run debut.

== Facilities ==
St. Cenydd is the designated centre for hearing impaired, physically disabled, and speech and language pupils within the area, with facilities for both special-needs and able-bodied students.

== Notable teachers & students ==
- Steve Fenwick, a former Welsh rugby union player, was a teacher here in the 1970s and 80s
- Vikki Howells, a Member of the Senedd, was a history teacher here prior to her election in 2016
- Martin Williams was a history teacher who won the Teacher of the Year in a Secondary School award for the Welsh region in 2002
- Bobbie Allen, author of 'Hollie's Dream of Consciousness' and 'Waiting for Something Better to Happen', taught at St Cenydd 2001 - 2011.
- George Gasson, born 1997, rugby union player for Dragons RFC
- Harri Ford, born 2005, rugby union player for Dragons RFC
