= St James's Church, Rudry =

St James, Rudry
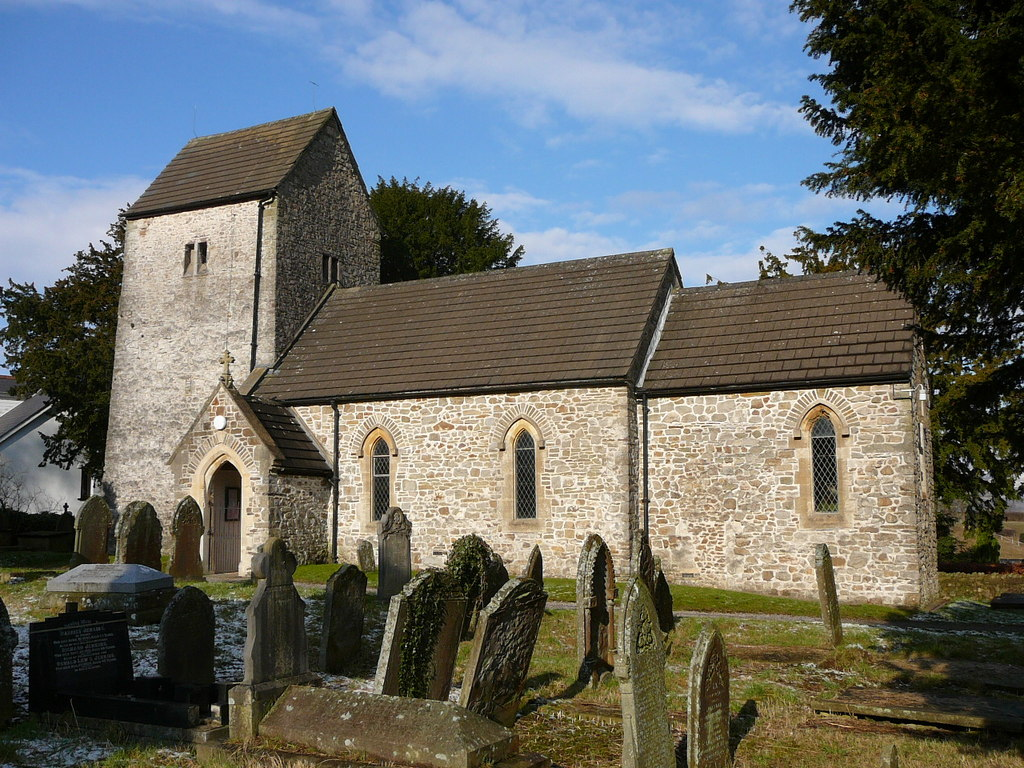
- St James's
- St James, Rudry
- 51.572°N 3.1657°W
- Denomination: Church in Wales
- Previous denomination: Roman Catholic

History
- Status: Active
- Founded: c.1254; 772 years ago
- Dedication: St James the Great

Architecture
- Functional status: Parish church
- Heritage designation: Grade II
- Designated: 28 March 1963
- Style: English Gothic

Specifications
- Materials: Stone

Administration
- Diocese: Diocese of Monmouth
- Archdeaconry: Newport
- Deanery: Bassaleg
- Parish: Rudry

St James's Church, Rudry is an historic Anglican church in the village of Rudry in the Diocese of Monmouth.

== History ==
The church was founded in the mid 13th Century (possibly 1254) as a wayside shrine used by pilgrims. A church was present at the location by 1295, when it was a chapel of ease to the parish church in Bedwas, St Barrwg. It retained this function for the next 619 years, separating from Bedwas in 1914. The parish records at St James's date back to 1627. After 1254, the Bishop of Llandaf held the right to appoint the parish priest at Rudry, a practice which would continue until 1920. There exists a long-standing local myth that Oliver Cromwell sought refuge in St James's during the English Civil War. Hard evidence for this is lacking, though it is known that King Charles I spent time at nearby Ruperra Castle. In the late 18th Century, the officiant at St James's was Father William Price, an eccentric priest who was known for his habit of swimming naked in local ponds. His son was William Price, the archdruid and pioneer of cremation, who was baptised in St James's in 1800.

== Conservation ==
The church was restored by John Prichard in 1885. It was Grade II listed in 1963. The tower at St James's was refurbished in the early 2011s.

== Churchyard ==
There are two Commonwealth War Graves Commission memorials in the churchyard, marking the burial place of two soldiers of the First World War. They commemorate Private David John Jones of the Australian Infantry, who died in September 1918, age 34, and Gunner Walter James Moses of the Royal Garrison Artillery, who died in November 1918, age 27.

The war memorial and three chest tombs of the Moses family in the churchyard are Grade II listed.
