= Penybryn =

Village in Wales

- Location within Wales Location within the United Kingdom
- Coordinates: 51.6580°N 3.2506°W
- Country: United Kingdom
- Constituent country: Wales
- County borough: Caerphilly

Penybryn is a small village situated near Gelligaer in the County Borough of Caerphilly, Wales.
