= Van, Caerphilly =

Van: Welsh: Y Fan
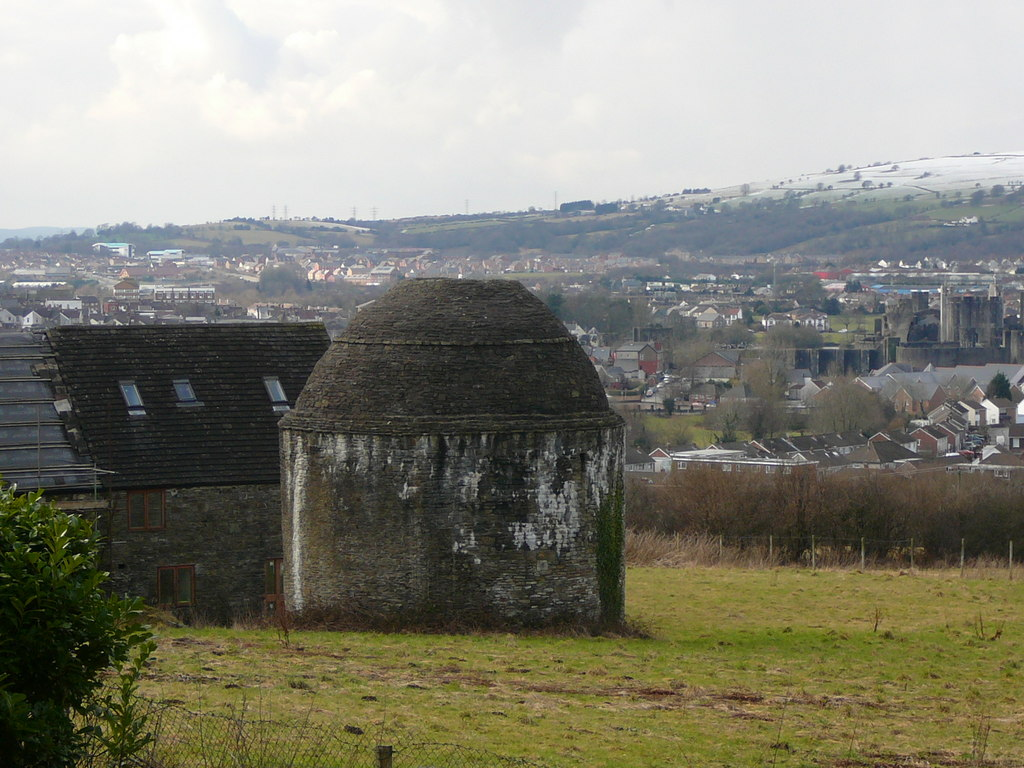

- Location within Caerphilly
- Population: 4,923 (2011)
- OS grid reference: ST165865
- Principal area: Caerphilly
- Preserved county: Gwent
- Country: Wales
- Sovereign state: United Kingdom
- Post town: CAERPHILLY
- Postcode district: CF83
- Dialling code: 029
- Police: Gwent
- Fire: South Wales
- Ambulance: Welsh
- UK Parliament: Caerphilly
- Senedd Cymru – Welsh Parliament: Caerphilly
- List of places UK Wales Caerphilly 51.5711°N 3.2062°W Map of the community

Van (Welsh: Y Fan) is a suburb and community in Caerphilly county borough in Wales, situated in the east of the town of Caerphilly. It contains the vast housing estate of Lansbury Park and the estates of Porset Park, Castle Park, Mornington Meadows and Badgers Wood. Van mainly consists of residential properties, one industrial estate and only one public house - The Fisherman's Rest. Nearly all of the property in Van is of post war construction. The area is served by one large primary school - St James. The same name is given to the electoral ward of Caerphilly County Borough council that also covers Van. According to the United Kingdom Census 2001 Van had a population of 5,050., decreasing to 4,923 in 2011 census.

For political administration Van is served by a Community Council that meets monthly.

== Van Castle ==
In the 1580s, permission was given to Thomas Lewis to use stone from nearby Caerphilly Castle to build a manor house. The resulting building was known as Van Castle, Castell y Fan, or simply 'The Van'. The building was seen as an innovation of its day but its construction led to the further dilapidation of the original castle in Caerphilly. Van Castle was abandoned in the mid-18th century when the Lewis family moved to St Fagans Castle. The gardens surrounding the house are listed on the Cadw/ICOMOS Register of Parks and Gardens of Special Historic Interest in Wales.

== Industrial Heritage ==
Van industrial heritage revolved around the Great Western Railway, where many of the engine and repair works were housed and the T Ness, Caerphilly Tar Distillation Works, which ceased operations in 1985.
