= Rhymney Valley =

Valley in south Wales

Coordinates: 51°41′52″N 3°13′46″W

The Rhymney Valley (Welsh: Cwm Rhymni) is one of the South Wales Valleys, largely following the Rhymney River forming the border between the historic counties of Glamorgan and Monmouthshire. Between 1974 and 1996 a Rhymney Valley local government district also existed (one of six of Mid Glamorgan). The valley lies entirely within the county borough of Caerphilly County Borough. The valley encompasses the villages of Abertysswg, Fochriw, Hengoed, Pontlottyn, Tir-Phil, New Tredegar, Nelson, Rhymney, Llanbradach, and Machen, and the towns of Bargoed, Caerphilly, Ystrad Mynach and Aberbargoed.

== Geography ==
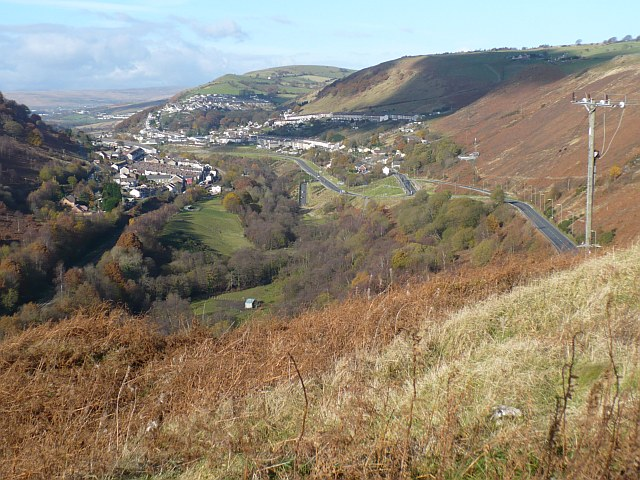

Created as a glacial valley, now the Rhymney River flows largely south from its source around the town of Rhymney to Rumney, a district of Cardiff. The river is the ancient boundary between Glamorgan and Monmouthshire.

Groesfaen, Deri, Pentwyn and Fochriw are located in the Darran Valley and not the Rhymney Valley. This valley joins the Rhymney Valley at Bargoed.

The valley can be divided into upper, middle, and lower parts of the valley. The upper part of the valley encompasses the narrower valley between the villages of Rhymney and Brithdir; the middle part of the valley is a part of a depression in the surrounding valleys; and the lower part of the valley is in the southern most parts of the South Wales Valleys, ending around the village of Machen before the flat plain around Cardiff and Newport.

The area around the middle of the Rhymney Valley as well as the Sirhowy Valley, spanning the area between the more prominent mountains around Newbridge, Brithdir, Treharris, and Caerphilly, is a geographical depression. This area has consequently developed a near continuous urban area between the towns of Newbridge, Blackwood, Bargoed, and Ystrad Mynach.

== History ==
This valley is one of the South Wales Valleys, and its history largely follows theirs: sparsely populated until the nineteenth century; industrialised for iron, steel and coal; industrial decline in the 1980s and 1990s.

In October 1907, Edmund Morgan, "Hermit of the Valley" or Emiont Siencyn, relented after twenty years of living in caves and huts on the mountains to that of the Merthyr Workhouse.

The Rhymney Valley produced a miner poet, Idris Davies of Rhymney, famous for his poems associated with the locality and the struggles of its people.

The 1990s brought improved road connections to the valley—a dual carriageway running north from Caerphilly—increasing access to and from Cardiff and the M4 motorway, and increasing the numbers of commuters from the valley to Cardiff. The area is now one of the most populous in Wales.

The Rhymney Valley hosted the National Eisteddfod in 1990.

=== Gorsedd Stones ===
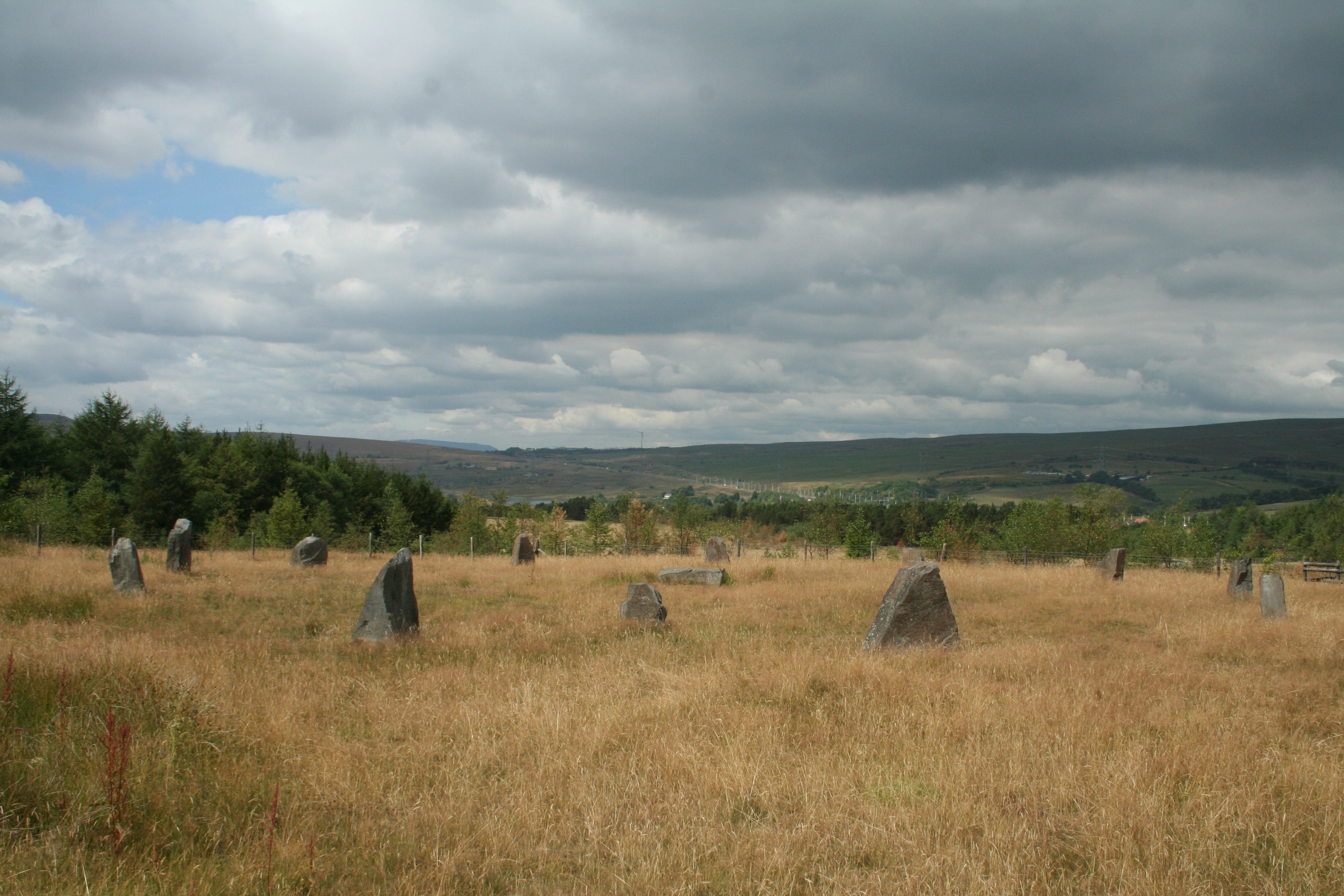
Rhymney Valley Gorsedd Stones

The Rhymney Valley Gorsedd Stones are located above Bryn Bach Park, Tredegar on the site of the 1990 National Eisteddfod of Wales hosted by the Rhymney Valley.

The stone circle consists of 12 standing stones arranged in a circle approximately 25 metres (82 ft) across with the tallest being 1.8 metres (5 ft 11 in) high a thirteenth stone marks the entrance to the circle. In the centre is a flat stone known as the Logan stone. Stone circles of this type were erected on all sites of the National Eisteddfod until 2005 when as a cost-cutting exercise fibre-glass stone circles were used for the first time. 51°46'35.6"N 3°16'46.1"W

== Legend ==
There is a legend to explain how coal first came to be found in the Rhymney Valley. It is said that the local fairies were being pestered by a giant. They asked help from an owl who slew the giant. As the fairies burnt the giant's body, the ground burned away, exposing the coal.

== Transport ==
- The Rhymney Valley railway runs through the valley.
- The major roads that go through the valley are the A469, A468, A4049, and A472.

== Bibliography ==
- Davies, John; Jenkins, Nigel; Menna, Baines; Lynch, Peredur I., eds. (2008). The Welsh Academy Encyclopaedia of Wales. Cardiff: University of Wales Press. ISBN 978-0-7083-1953-6.
