= Penpedairheol, Caerphilly =

Village in Caerphilly, Wales

Coordinates: 51.66968°N 3.24353°W

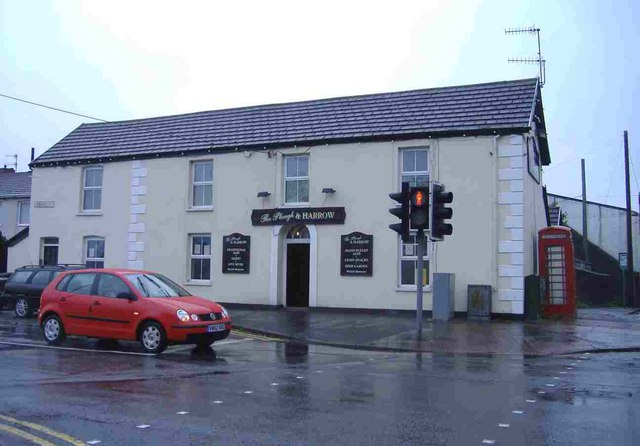
The Plough and Harrow, Hengoed Road, Penpedairheol

Penpedairheol is a village situated in the Rhymney Valleys, South Wales. It is located between Pengam, Gelligaer, Bargoed, Hengoed and Cefn Hengoed in the centre of Caerphilly borough, in the historic boundaries of Glamorgan. The translation of its names means the head of four roads.

Penpedairheol is frequently known as Cascade. Penpedairheol is split up into Dyffryn Park (most houses on this estate being built in the 1970s), Old Cascade, Forest Park, Bryn Siriol (homes on this estate being built in the 1990s), Westbury (homes on this estate being built in the 2000s), New Roman Gate housing estate (homes on this estate being built 2009/2010), and Glyn-Gaer (known as 'White City'), which is the location of Glyn-Gaer Primary School.

Although the village is surrounded by what some locals would refer to as some 'rough' parts of other villages and towns close by (such as Gelligaer, Pengam and Bargoed), Penpedairheol is seen as a safe environment and as a nice place to live. This is backed up objectively where Bargoed is ranked one of the most deprived areas in the Caerphilly borough, with parts of Pengam, Hengoed and Gelligaer indexed fairly high in doing poorly in community safety.

== Facilities ==
Commercial

Penpedairheol has one small off licence, known as Penpedairheol Central Stores; 'Premier Stores' that is located in 'the square'. There previously existed another, located in Glyn-Gaer housing estate. This however closed in 2012.

There is one pub; the 'Plough and Harrow' and one social club;the 'Beechgrove Social Club', one fish shop; 'Cascade Fish Bar'. The village also has a butcher's shop, a hairdresser; 'Queen of Hair' and a car repair centre, all of which are situated in 'the square', central Penpedairheol.

Community and Sporting

Penpedairheol has a community centre (situated near 'the square' as if heading towards Pengam) which is used for a number of events such as jazz band and is rented out for private events. This is seen by many as an unattractive building. There are two football fields; one situated at Dyffryn park, the other located in Old Cascade. The village also has its own football team called Cascade YC Football Club (or just Cascade YC FC for short), which used to be called the best team in they Rhymney Valley.

== Schools ==
There is one local infant and primary school in the village, Glyn-Gaer Primary School, with a number of other schools close by providing good choice.

== Carnival ==
There used to be an annual 'Cascade Carnival' held on the second Saturday of July which went on for around 10 years. This was cancelled in around 2012 allegedly due to trouble from locals in surrounding towns and villages drinking excessively at the event. The carnival used to turn out a great crowd and parades floated throughout the streets ending up at Dyffryn Playing Fields where there was a travelling funfair, stalls and a stage with events including a live band.

== Transport ==
Penpedairheol has public transport links to the surrounding villages that include Bargoed, Ystrad Mynach, nearby Nelson and the towns Caerphilly and Pontypridd.

The nearest railway station is a ten-minute walk away in Pengam, Cardiff being a forty-minute train journey from Pengam. There are also two other railway stations close by, located in Hengoed (which is the closer of the two) and Ystrad Mynach, providing services to Cardiff and other towns.
