= Llanfabon =

Hamlet in Caerphilly, Wales

Coordinates: 51.63865°N 3.27846°W

- Location within Caerphilly
- OS grid reference: ST 10812 93819
  - Cardiff: 11.65 mi (18.75 km) SSE
- Community: Nelson
- Principal area: Caerphilly
- Country: Wales
- Sovereign state: United Kingdom
- Post town: NELSON
- Dialling code: 01443
- Police: Gwent
- Fire: South Wales
- Ambulance: Welsh
- UK Parliament: Caerphilly
- Senedd Cymru – Welsh Parliament: Caerphilly

Llanfabon (also known as Llanvabon) is a hamlet and former parish in South Wales.

The area is now part of the current community of Nelson, and part of Caerphilly County Borough.

At St. Mabon's Church in Llanfabon, there is a memorial to the eleven killed at the 1894 Albion Colliery disaster, who were not identified.

== History ==
As described in 1849, it comprised two hamlets, in the union of Merthyr Tydfil, hundred of Caerphilly, county of Glamorgan, 9 miles (S. S. E.) from Merthyr Tydfil; containing 1449 inhabitants. A Topographical Dictionary of Wales (1849) described it as follows:

This parish is bounded on the west by the river Tâf, and on the east by the Romney; and comprises about 5000 acres, of which 1120 are arable, 2230 pasture, 1000 common, 500 woodland consisting chiefly of oak, and the remainder roads and water. The surface is in general mountainous; and the scenery picturesque, especially in the vicinity of the village of Craigyberthlwyd, from which the views are striking and beautiful. The soil comprehends gravel, clay, and peat, and the chief agricultural produce is wheat, barley, and oats, the last of which is grown in a larger quantity than either of the two former. Tiles for building are made, and there are excellent stone-quarries, and coal-mines, but they are not in operation to any great extent, the latter being chiefly on the border, and appropriated to the use of the neighbourhood only.
The greater part of the colliers of Gellygaer, an adjoining parish, live in Llanvabon. The ancient seat of the Lanbradach family is situated here; and besides the village above-named, the parish contains those of Quakers'-Yard and Nelson.
It is intersected by the road from Cardiff to Merthyr, which passes about two miles and a half westward from the church; and by the Glamorganshire canal, on the banks of which, within its limits, is situated the Navigation-House, where this important line of communication is joined by the Aberdare Canal, and where barges are loaded with coal and iron for the port of Cardiff. The TâfVale railway, also, passes by Quakers'-Yard and the Navigation-House, and is joined in this vicinity by the Aberdare railway, for the construction of which an act was obtained in 1846.
The living is consolidated with the vicarage of Eglwysilan: the tithes have been commuted for £270, of which a sum of £200 is payable to the Dean and Chapter of Llandaf, and £70 to the vicar. The church, dedicated to St. Mabon, is an ancient structure, consisting of a nave and chancel, forty-three feet in length and twentyone in breadth, and containing accommodation for about 120 persons. There are two places of worship for Calvinistic Methodists, two for Independents, and one for Baptists; in each of which a Sunday school is also held. James Thomas, in 1730, gave by will a rent-charge of £2 for the benefit of the poor, to be equally divided between those of each hamlet.

== In culture ==
- Llanvabon is the name of the spaceship in the science fiction novelette First Contact.
- Llanfabon is the name of the FFR-31 MR/D Super Sylph fighter jet designated B-7 of Boomerang Squadron in Chōhei Kambayashi's science fiction novel Good Luck, Yukikaze.
