= Penmaen, Caerphilly =

Penmaen
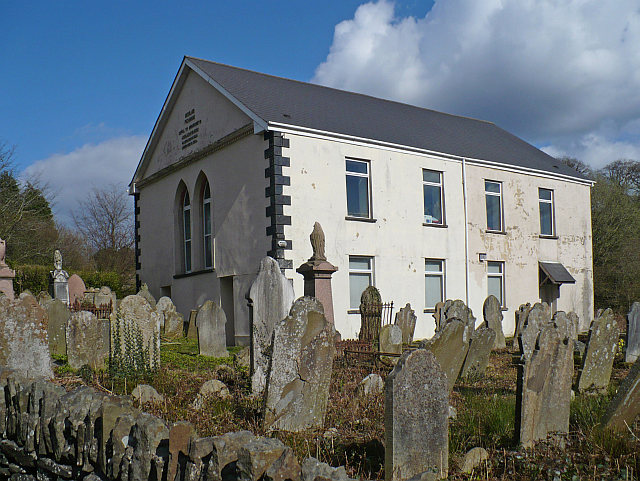
- Penmaen Chapel and gravestones

- Location within Caerphilly
- Population: 5,251 (2011)
- OS grid reference: ST193990
- Principal area: Caerphilly
- Preserved county: Gwent
- Country: Wales
- Sovereign state: United Kingdom
- Post town: BLACKWOOD
- Postcode district: NP12
- Dialling code: 01495
- Police: Gwent
- Fire: South Wales
- Ambulance: Welsh
- UK Parliament: Newport West and Islwyn
- Senedd Cymru – Welsh Parliament: Islwyn
- List of places UK Wales Caerphilly 51.670339°N 3.179917°W Map of the community

Penmaen (historically sometimes spelled Penmain) is a hamlet and community in Caerphilly county borough, south Wales, within the historic boundaries of Monmouthshire. It is situated in the Sirhowy valley, 3 miles (4.8 km) East of Blackwood. It is contiguous with, if not completely encompassed by, the larger village of Oakdale, which forms most of the community urban area.

Penmain is an anglicisation of the Welsh language name Penmaen, meaning quite simply "headland" or "outcrop" (a common element in Welsh placenames: literally, rock/stone hill). Both spellings are found locally, with the English spelling predominant throughout the majority of the nineteenth and twentieth centuries, but the Welsh spelling is the one now more generally used.

== History ==
In 1845, the district of Penmain became an ecclesiastical parish, formed out of the parish of Mynyddislwyn, and in 1855 the Church of St. David was built, having seating for 300 worshippers. Its registers started from 1866. A National School was built there in 1845 for 250 pupils.

In 1870 Penmain was described as:

PENMAIN, a chapelry in Mynyddyslwyn parish, Monmouth; between the rivers Ebbw and Sirhowy, near Abercarn r. station, and 12 miles N W of Newport. Post-town, Abercarn, under Newport. Acres, 4, 250. Real property, £12, 236; of which £7, 630 are in mines, and £30 in quarries. Pop. in 1851, 2,379; in 1861, 2,686., Houses, 562. The property is subdivided. The living is a p. curacy in the diocese of Llandaff. Value, £150. Patron, alternately the Crown and the Bishop. The church is good; and there is an Independent chapel.

— John Marius Wilson, Imperial Gazetteer of England and Wales

The chapel he describes is the Congregational chapel. It was started by Henry Walter, who had been curate of Mynyddislwyn and, later, vicar of St. Woolos Newport. In 1618, King James issued the "Book of Sports", which relaxed the previous attitudes to Sunday amusements, and set out which times were to be allowed on the Sabbath. There was much opposition to this by the clergy, and it continued up to the Civil War. Afterwards, in 1660, when Charles II came to the throne, he re-introduced it. Many clergymen refused to obey, including Henry Walter, who was dismissed from his position in the Church. He then set up the Independent Chapel at Penmain, although the Nonconformist chapel building was not completed until 1691. Services were held in Welsh. It was rebuilt in 1828, renovated in 1888, and is the second oldest existing Independent Chapel in Wales.

No longer used for worship, the building is now the 'home' of the Mynyddislwyn Male Choir.

== Politics ==
Penmaen ward is an electoral ward district in the County Borough of Caerphilly, covering the village of Oakdale, and the hamlets of Penmaen, Pen-y-fan and Woodfieldside. It is currently represented by two Plaid Cymru councillors.
