= Markham, Caerphilly =

Coordinates: 51.706002°N 3.209790°W

Markham
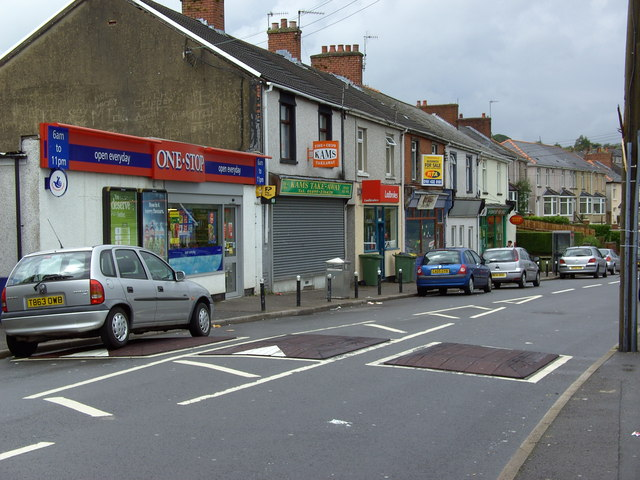

- Location within Caerphilly
- OS grid reference: SO165015
- Principal area: Caerphilly
- Preserved county: Gwent
- Country: Wales
- Sovereign state: United Kingdom
- Post town: BLACKWOOD
- Postcode district: NP12
- Dialling code: 01495
- Police: Gwent
- Fire: South Wales
- Ambulance: Welsh
- UK Parliament: Newport West and Islwyn
- Senedd Cymru – Welsh Parliament: Islwyn

Markham is a small village in the South Wales Valleys in Caerphilly County Borough, to the northeast of Bargoed. The B4511 road links to Markham from Aberbargoed and joins the A4048 road to the north of Argoed. The Sirhowy River flows to the east of the village. The village's population was around 1,495 people in 2011.

== History ==
The area was formerly known as "Berllan Llwyd" and this name appears on tithe maps until the twentieth century. The name would seem to mean "The Grey/Brown Orchard" and was also the name of a farm whose land the modern village was built on. The modern Miners Institute and Welfare Club occupy the site of the farm buildings.

The nature of the area was dramatically changed when the Markham Steam Coal Company opened Markham Colliery in 1913. The mine cost £600,000 to sink, but the company also planned and built a new village which would house around 1,000 workers. This village quickly became known as Markham by both Welsh and English speakers. The planned village was seen as an attractive place to live, as exemplified by the often stated belief that Markham was the first mining village to have a bath in every property. It was shown as Markham Village on an Ordnance Survey map published in 1947, the village affix was dropped on later maps however.

Markham Institute was funded by the colliery workers and built in 1928 on land formerly belonging to the Berllan-Llwyd farm. Today Markham is a district of the community of Argoed.

== Landmarks ==
At the heart of the village is an active Congregational Chapel. It celebrated its centenary in 2016. A Welfare Hall was built during its time as a mining village, which also housed a cinema. Today the hall is still used as a Social Club.

The village's primary school, Markham Primary School, is a feeder school for Islwyn High School Markham RFC currently play in the WRU Swalec League Five South East.

== Notable people from Markham ==
- Gerwyn Price — 2021 World Champion and three-time Grand Slam of Darts champion and the first Welshman to win a PDC televised major. He is a 6-time major champion and the number eleven player in the world according to the rankings as of February 2026.
