= Graig-y-Rhacca =

Coordinates: 51.594°N 3.165°W

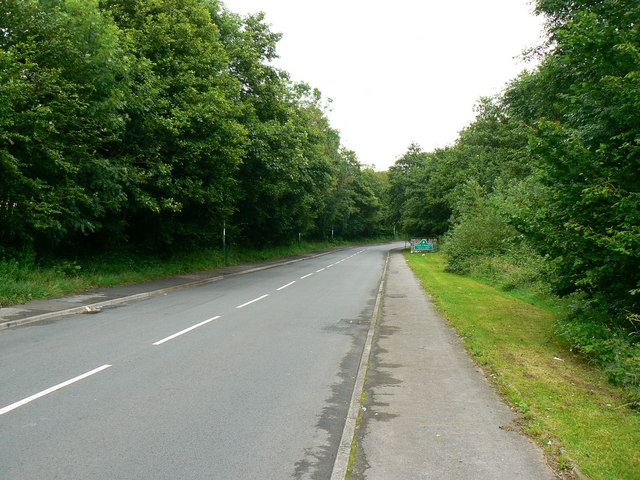
- Road to Graig-y-Rhacca

- Location within Caerphilly
- Population: 1,263
- Principal area: Caerphilly
- Preserved county: Gwent
- Country: Wales
- Sovereign state: United Kingdom
- Post town: CAERPHILLY
- Postcode district: CF83
- Dialling code: 029
- Police: Gwent
- Fire: South Wales
- Ambulance: Welsh
- UK Parliament: Caerphilly

Graig-y-Rhacca is a housing estate bordering Trethomas, Bedwas and Machen in the borough of Caerphilly, southeastern Wales. The town is about 8 miles to the west of Newport and 4 miles to the east of Caerphilly. The town mainly consists of local authority tenancies and privately owned estates.

== Population ==
The median age of the town was 40 as of the 2011 census. The biggest age group in the town was 49-59 year olds, with 20% of the population. 96.7% of the population were from the United Kingdom with only 1.2% from outside of the EU, compared to 3.3% in Wales.
