= Llanbradach and Pwllypant =

Coordinates: 51°36′43″N 3°14′02″W

- Community
- Location within Caerphilly
- Principal area: Caerphilly
- Country: Wales
- Sovereign state: United Kingdom
- Police: Gwent
- Fire: South Wales
- Ambulance: Welsh
- List of places UK Wales Caerphilly Map of the community

Llanbradach and Pwllypant is a community in the county of Caerphilly, South Wales. It includes the large village of Llanbradach and Pwll-y-Pant.

It has a community council.
