= Mornington Meadows =

Suburb in Caerphilly, Wales

Coordinates: 51°35′04″N 3°12′12″W

Mornington Meadows (Welsh: Dolydd Trefore) is a residential area in the town of Caerphilly, south Wales. The name comes from the pastoral land and hay meadows which once covered this area. It borders Porset Park to the south, with pastoral land to the north-east. It is within the community council of Van, Caerphilly and the electoral ward of St. James. The estate was constructed in the 1970s and has been in the news with instances of drug use, vandalism and rubbish in public places.

All residential roads within the estate are linked into a circular internal ring road - Pen Y Cae. The estate only has one exit road for vehicles, but has a considerable number of pedestrian paths in to and out of the estate. Despite Mornington Meadows having an English name all of the roads in the estate have Welsh names.
