= Newport West and Islwyn =

UK Parliament constituency (since 2024)

- constituency for the House of Commons
- Interactive map of the constituency.
- Location of the constituency within Wales
- Electorate: 76,234 (March 2020)
- Major settlements: Newport (part), Risca, Newbridge, Blackwood

Current constituency
- Created: 2024
- Member of Parliament: Ruth Jones (Labour)
- Seats: One
- Created from: Newport West, Islwyn

Overlaps
- Senedd: Casnewydd Islwyn

Newport West and Islwyn (Welsh: Gorllewin Casnewydd ac Islwyn) is a constituency of the House of Commons in the UK Parliament, first contested at the 2024 general election, following the 2023 review of Westminster constituencies. It is currently represented by Labour's Ruth Jones, who was previously MP for Newport West from 2019 to 2024.

== Boundaries ==
Under the 2023 review, the constituency was defined as being composed of the following, as they existed on 1 December 2020:

- The County Borough of Caerphilly wards of:Abercarn; Argoed; Blackwood; Cefn Fforest; Crosskeys; Crumlin; Newbridge; Penmaen; Risca East; Risca West.
- The City and County Borough of Newport wards of: Allt-yr-Yn; Gaer; Graig; Marshfield; Rogerstone; Tredegar Park.

Following local government boundary reviews which came into effect in May 2022, the constituency now comprises the following from the 2024 general election:

- The following Caerphilly County Borough wards from Islwyn (constituency abolished):
  - Abercarn
  - Argoed
  - Blackwood
  - Cefn Fforest and Pengam (part)
  - Crosskeys
  - Crumlin
  - Newbridge
  - Penmaen
  - Risca East
  - Risca West
- The following City of Newport wards from Newport West (constituency abolished):
  - Allt-yr-yn
  - Gaer
  - Graig
  - Rogerstone East
  - Rogerstone North
  - Rogerstone West
  - Tredegar Park and Marshfield

== Elections ==
=== Elections in the 2020s ===
General election 2024: Newport West and Islwyn
Party	Candidate	Votes	%	±%
Labour	Ruth Jones	17,409	41.5	−0.3
Reform	Paul Taylor	8,541	20.4	+11.5
Conservative	Nick Jones	6,710	16.0	−21.7
Plaid Cymru	Brandon Ham	3,529	8.4	+3.8
Liberal Democrats	Mike Hamilton	2,087	5.0	−0.1
Green	Kerry Vosper	2,078	5.0	N/A
Independent	George Etheridge	1,597	3.8	+3.8
Majority		8,868	21.1	+17.0
Turnout		41,951	55.4	−8.3
Registered electors		75,781		
Labour win (new seat)				

=== Elections in the 2010s ===
2019 notional result (Note: Estimate of the 2019 general election result as if the revised boundaries recommended under the 2023 boundary review were in place)
Party	Vote	%
Labour	20,286	41.8
Conservative	18,285	37.7
Brexit Party	4,301	8.9
Liberal Democrats	2,474	5.1
Plaid Cymru	2,244	4.6
Green Party	947	2.0
Majority	2,001	4.1
Turnout	48,537	63.7
Electorate	76,234	
