= Trinant =

Coordinates: 51.6965°N 3.150°W

Trinant: Welsh: Trinant
- Location within Caerphilly
- OS grid reference: SO2061500376
- Principal area: Caerphilly
- Preserved county: Gwent
- Country: Wales
- Sovereign state: United Kingdom
- Post town: Newport
- Postcode district: NP11
- Dialling code: 01495
- Police: Gwent
- Fire: South Wales
- Ambulance: Welsh
- UK Parliament: Newport West and Islwyn

Trinant is a village located in the county borough of Caerphilly, within the historic county borders of Monmouthshire. Trinant is part of the community of Crumlin and is located north of the village of Crumlin and west of the Ebbw River. The village has a single school, Trinant Primary School. Trinant is the home to Trinant RFC rugby union team.

== Notable buildings ==
Located within the boundaries of Trinant on its eastern border lies Llanerch-uchaf farmhouse, a grade II listed building. Of either late 18th century or early 19th century origin, the farmhouse and attached range have been noted for being examples of a 'regional farmstead retaining much of its historic character'. The farmhouse is a T-shaped two-storeyed build with the attached farm range of lime-washed stone rubble and Welsh slate roof. Horeb Chapel is another building of note in Trinant, completed in 1901. The current chapel is built on a plot of land 20 yards (18 m) from where the original Horeb Chapel stood in the 19th century.
