= Bute Town =

Coordinates: 51.774°N 3.300°W

Bute Town: Welsh: Drenewydd
- Location within Caerphilly
- OS grid reference: SO 104 092
- Principal area: Caerphilly
- Preserved county: Gwent
- Country: Wales
- Sovereign state: United Kingdom
- Post town: TREDEGAR
- Postcode district: NP22
- Dialling code: 01685
- Police: Gwent
- Fire: South Wales
- Ambulance: Welsh
- UK Parliament: Blaenau Gwent and Rhymney
- Senedd Cymru – Welsh Parliament: Merthyr Tydfil and Rhymney

Bute Town (Welsh: Drenewydd, lit. 'New Town') is a village in the county borough of Caerphilly, near Rhymney, in Wales. Locally, Bute Town is spoken and written as a single word, Butetown.

== History ==
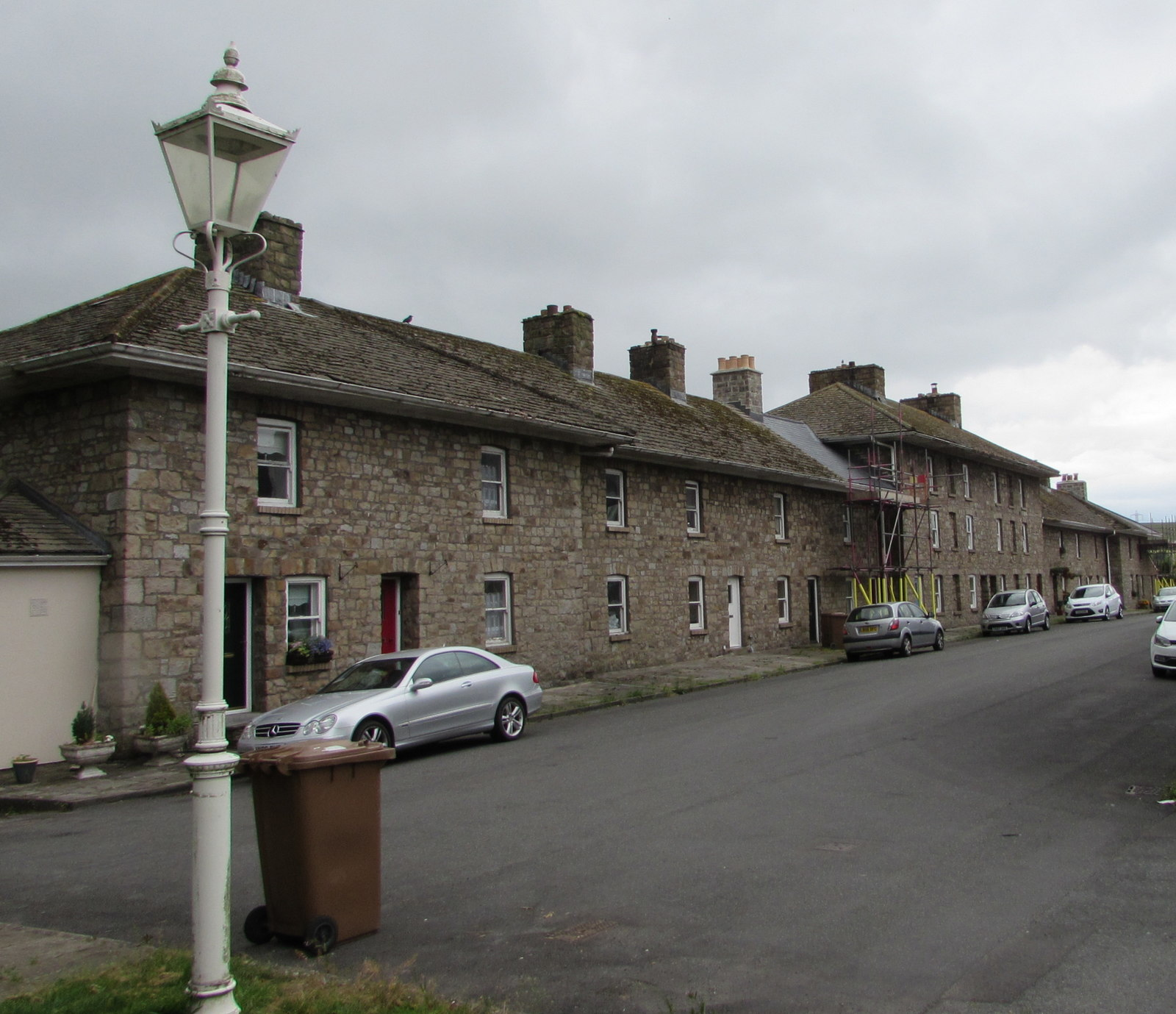
Lower Row, Bute Town

Throughout the 18th century, portions of land entered the estate of the Scottish Bute Estate, of which the area around Bute Town was one, and so the village was named after the Marquis of Bute. The area was developed into a "model village" to house local ironworkers in the 1830s and consisted of three rows of 16 houses each, for a total of 48 residences. The village's population fluctuated, and in the 19th century between 195 and 430 people lived there.

The village reached a peak in population in 1871, when the Rhymney Valley transitioned from iron production to coal mining and when a growth in railroads in the area brought a spike in workers to the town.

Bute Town has been a Conservation Area since October 1972, and all of the buildings are on the statutory list of buildings of architectural or historic interest.

The Doctor Who episode "The Crimson Horror" filmed on location in Bute Town in July 2012, starring Matt Smith at the Eleventh Doctor, Jenna Coleman as companion Clara Oswald and also the late Dame Diana Rigg and her daughter Rachael Stirling, in their first and only time acting together.

== Twisted Chimney ==
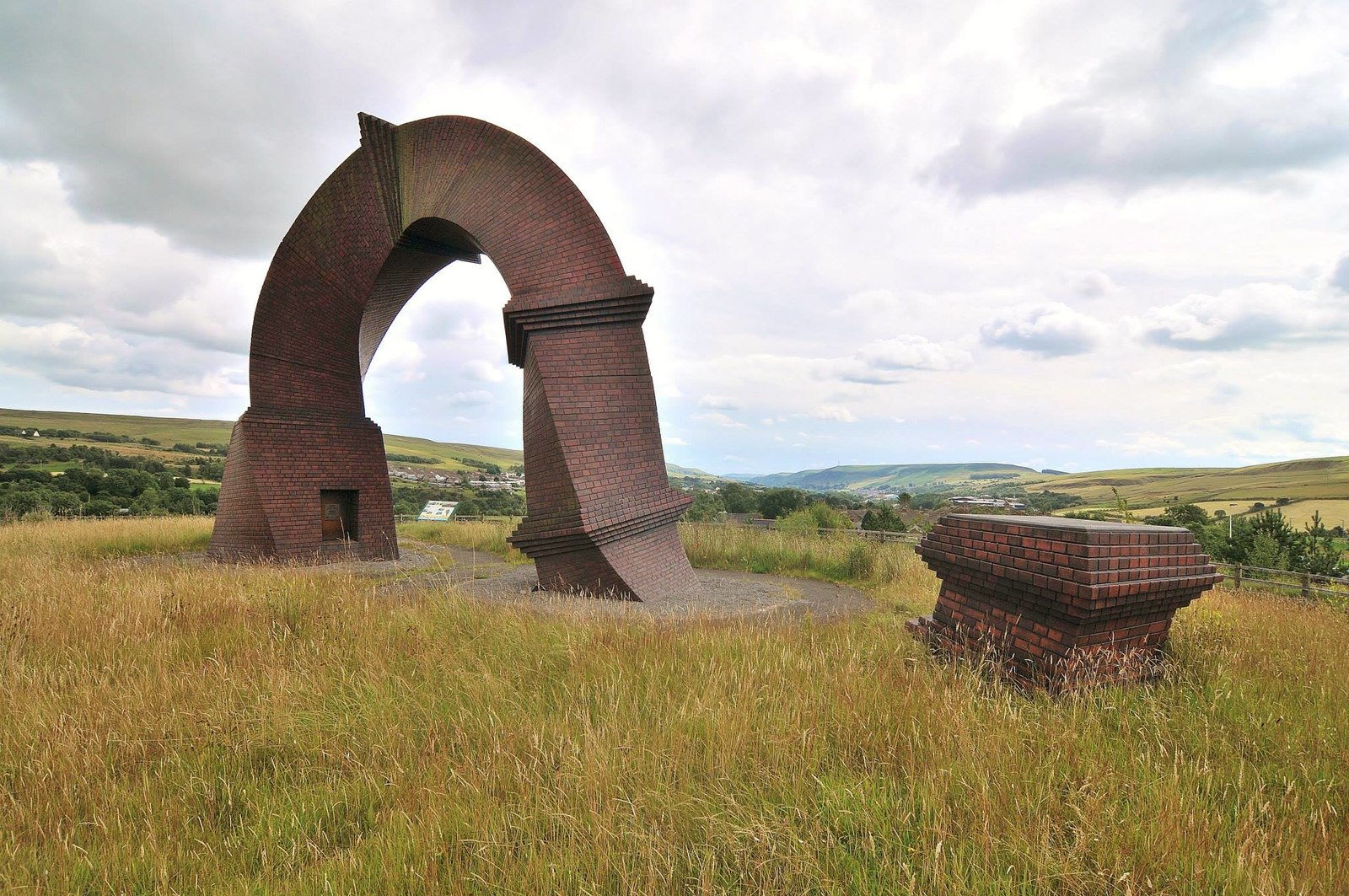

An 8 metre high sculpture of a bent and twisted brick chimney, called Twisted Chimney, is located just north of Bute Town at the junction of the A469 and B4257 roads. The sculpture was created in 2010 by New York artist Brian Tolle and funded by the Heads of the Valleys Initiative Programme at a cost of £180,000. The sculpture, at the far north of the borough was intended to act as a "gateway" and "a vision of the post-industrial heritage" of the area.
