= Argoed, Caerphilly =

Argoed
- Location within Caerphilly
- Community: Argoed
- Principal area: Caerphilly
- Preserved county: Gwent
- Country: Wales
- Sovereign state: United Kingdom
- Post town: NEWPORT
- Postcode district: NP
- Police: Gwent
- Fire: South Wales
- Ambulance: Welsh
- UK Parliament: Newport West and Islwyn
- Senedd Cymru – Welsh Parliament: Islwyn
- List of places UK Wales Caerphilly 51.6935°N 3.1922°W Map of the community

Argoed (Welsh for 'by a wood' / 'by a grove') is a village, community and an electoral ward in the Sirhowy Valley between Blackwood and Tredegar in Caerphilly County Borough in south Wales. The population of the community and ward at the 2011 census was 2,769. As a community, Argoed also contains the villages of Markham and Hollybush.

Before 1960 the village was served by Argoed railway station. This was initially a stop on the Sirhowy Tramroad, which opened in 1822. The tramroad was converted to a conventional standard gauge railway in 1865, the Sirhowy Railway. The station closed in 1960 and the railway has been converted into a cycle path.

Zephaniah Williams, prosecuted for his part in the Chartist Newport Rising in 1839, was born in the village in 1795.

== Suspected murder ==
On 6 November 2014 Cerys Yemm was killed in The Sirhowy Arms Hotel, Argoed, which was providing accommodation to released prisoners as an 'approved premises'. The suspected murderer, Matthew Williams a recently released prisoner, was Tasered at the scene by officers of Gwent Police, and died shortly afterwards. The Independent Police Complaints Commission announced an investigation into the Police's handling of the incident.

== See also ==
- Markham
