= Cefn Fforest =

- Location within Caerphilly
- Population: 3,894 (2011)
- OS grid reference: ST165975
- Principal area: Caerphilly
- Preserved county: Gwent
- Country: Wales
- Sovereign state: United Kingdom
- Post town: BLACKWOOD
- Postcode district: NP12
- Dialling code: 01443, 01495
- Police: Gwent
- Fire: South Wales
- Ambulance: Welsh
- UK Parliament: Newport West and Islwyn
- Senedd Cymru – Welsh Parliament: Islwyn
- List of places UK Wales Caerphilly 51.6700°N 3.2088°W Map of the community

Cefn Fforest is a community and an electoral ward in Caerphilly County Borough, Wales. A wholly urbanized community, it forms the western fringes of the town of Blackwood. By area, it is the smallest of all of the communities of Wales.

Cefn Fforest was built in 1915 to house local workers and was originally known as Pengam Garden Village.

== Education ==
There is a local primary school located centrally within the community called Cefn Fforest Primary School The school was built as part of the Garden Village development and was formally opened on 18 October 1915. At the time of opening, the school was known as Cefn Fforest Council School and was built to provide for 600 children, including 250 infants. Students who attend Cefn Fforest Primary School range in ages from 5 years old to 12 years old, and in 2022 the number of students was 289.

Cefn Fforest's nearest secondary school is Blackwood Comprehensive. Students who attend Blackwood Comprehensive School range in ages from 12 years old to 16 years old.

== Sports ==
Cefn Fforest has an angling club called named Cefn Fforest angling club.

The village also has a football team named Cefn Fforest A.F.C.

== Notable people ==
- Dave (Dai) Fleet, Founder and owner of Abracadabra tattoo studio
- Dream Alliance, thoroughbred racehorse
- Nathan Cleverly, Welsh former professional boxer
