= Cefn Hengoed =

Village in Wales

Coordinates: 51°39′16″N 3°14′04″W

Cefn Hengoed is a small village in the Rhymney Valley, in the centre of Caerphilly borough, within the historic boundaries of Glamorganshire. Bordering the larger village of Hengoed, Cefn Hengoed contains the local Derwendeg primary school, which has recently celebrated its 90th birthday. Cefn Hengoed is within the Gelligaer Community.

== History ==
Cefn Hengoed has a public house called The Crosskeys, which is situated facing the opening of Lansbury Avenue and the Lindsay Constitutional Club for adults. There is also a youth centre in Cefn Hengoed founded by a former Community Councilor Rob Thomas with other local residents. Locals say that it was founded to dissuade local youths from causing disruption after a spate of complaints about unruly behaviour in the bus shelters. Caerphilly Council's answer at the time was to knock down the bus shelters, leaving local youngsters with nowhere to gather. Caerphilly council now officially recognises the value of the youth centre and provides trained youth workers to facilitate its youth sessions.

Cefn Hengoed Ladies' Choir was formed in 1947.

St Anne's Church was formerly located on Hengoed Road, but is now closed.

== Notable people ==
- Jimmy Singer footballer was born in the village
