= Waterloo, Caerphilly =

Coordinates: 51°35′13″N 3°09′45″W

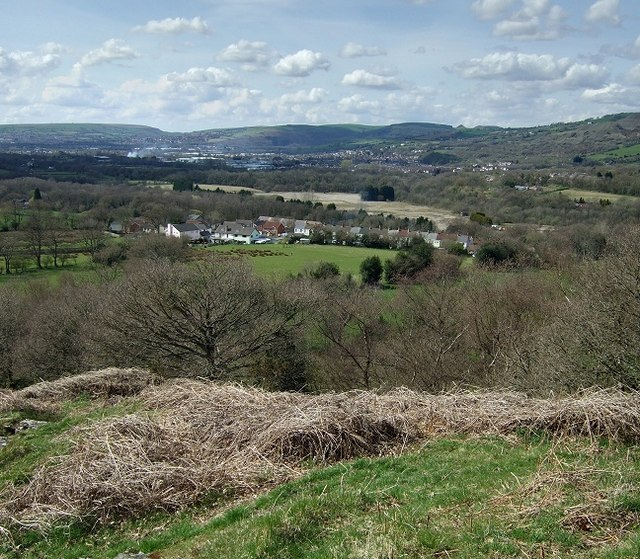
Ty'n-y-coedcae

Waterloo (Welsh: Ty'n-y-coedcae) is a small hamlet to the east of Caerphilly, Wales, in the community of Rudry.

== History ==
The area was anciently known as Ty'n-y-coedcae from tyddyn + y + coetgae (English: The House of the hedged field) and was notably the home of the eccentric Reverend William Price and the birthplace of his son, William Price on 4 March 1800. A Green Plaque was erected to mark the hamlet as his birthplace, it can be found on an end house of Waterloo Terrace. The area at the time was known as part of Rudry.

The area became known in English as Waterloo with the construction of the large Waterloo tin plate works at the end of the nineteenth century, with a terrace of houses named "Waterloo Row" being constructed for the workers to the east of the works (on the land of Ty'n-y-coedcae farm) in 1891. The works consisted of four mills and was converted to electricity in 1922. Among other items, the Waterloo Works manufactured equipment for the aviation industry (such as the aircraft works at Machen). The site was closed in 1943 and was utilised as a Naval storage depot for the rest of the Second World War, but is marked as "disused" on the 1948 Ordnance Survey map, and as being in ruins in the 1952, 1963 and 1974 editions.

The village was also home to the Coates Brothers Paint works which was, together with the colliery, one of the biggest employers in the area. The company was later devolved to making inks etc., and closed in the late 1990s. The site was undergoing planning permission to become a housing estate but this was rejected by Caerphilly Borough County Council in 2019. As at 2021 no planning application exists.
