= Trecenydd =

Residential area in Caerphilly, Wales

Coordinates: 51.576°N 3.239°W

- Location within Caerphilly
- Population: 12,216
- OS grid reference: ST 1487
- Principal area: Caerphilly
- Preserved county: Gwent
- Country: Wales
- Sovereign state: United Kingdom
- Post town: CAERPHILLY
- Postcode district: CF83
- Dialling code: 029
- Police: Gwent
- Fire: South Wales
- Ambulance: Welsh
- UK Parliament: Caerphilly
- Senedd Cymru – Welsh Parliament: Caerphilly

Trecenydd is a residential area consisting mostly of council housing in Caerphilly, Wales.

It is near the centre of Caerphilly and the estate is relatively small compared to other areas of Caerphilly.

Trecenydd is home to the St Cenydd Comprehensive School. In 2025 Caerphilly County Borough Council decided to merge the Hendre Infant School, and the Hendre Junior School into a single primary school.
