= Lansbury Park =

Residential suburb in Caerphilly, Wales

Coordinates: 51.578°N 3.207°W

Lansbury Park is a residential suburb of the town of Caerphilly in Wales.

The estate was built as council housing (by housebuilders and civil contractors the John Laing Group) in the 1960s on former farmland. The first two housing courts were officially opened by Ness Edwards, the local MP, in 1965. It is in the eastern part of Caerphilly and is overshadowed, though at some distance, by the concentric castle of Caerphilly Castle, the second biggest of its type in Europe.

A Morrisons supermarket and petrol station with a convenience store are nearby. Public transport is infrequent.

The estate was named after George Lansbury the politician. He was Leader of the Labour Party from 1932 to 1935. He was the grandfather of Angela Lansbury, the star of Murder She Wrote and other TV dramas. There is a Lansbury Estate in the London Borough of Tower Hamlets named after George Lansbury as well.

The people on the estate live in poverty which has been described as "entrenched". Many people on the estate do not have secure employment, or are in low-paid work. In 2014, the estate was identified in the Multiple deprivation index as the most deprived area in Wales. In 2019, its ranking fell slightly to make it the third most deprived area in Wales.
