= Draethen =

Coordinates: 51.58°N 3.125°W

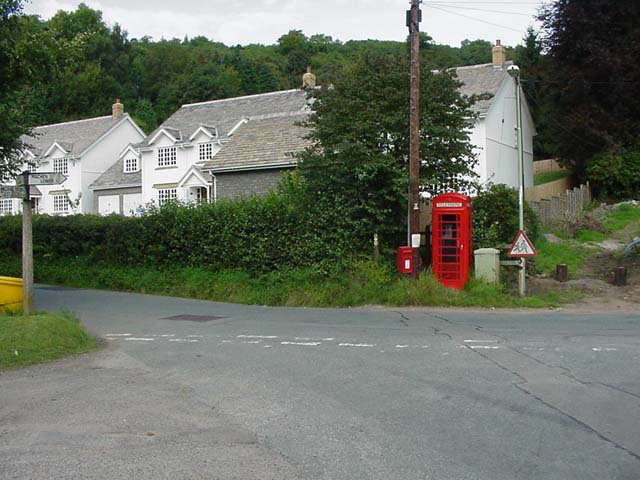
- Draethen Village Crossroads

- Location within Caerphilly
- OS grid reference: ST225915
- Principal area: Caerphilly
- Preserved county: Gwent
- Country: Wales
- Sovereign state: United Kingdom
- Post town: NEWPORT
- Postcode district: NP10
- Dialling code: 01633 44
- Police: Gwent
- Fire: South Wales
- Ambulance: Welsh
- UK Parliament: Caerphilly
- Senedd Cymru – Welsh Parliament: Caerphilly

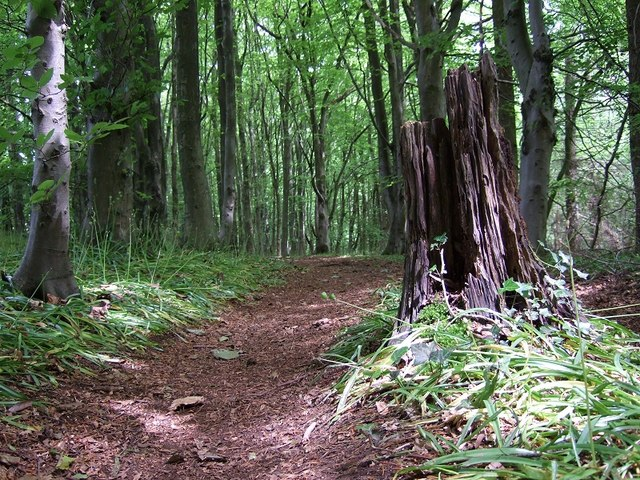
The Llwyn Hir Forestry Walk through Draethen Woods

Draethen is a village in the county borough of Caerphilly, South Wales, and the community of Rudry. The village is located some 3 miles (4.8 km) east of Caerphilly, and 6 miles (9.7 km) northeast of Cardiff.

Located on the southern reaches of the Rhymney River within the historic boundaries of Glamorgan, Draethen is bordered by Bedwas to the west, Rhiwderin to the east, Michaelston-y-Fedw to the south east and Lower Machen to the north.

Draethen Woods contain a number of former lead mining sites and surface workings dating back to at least Roman times. The mines once exploited a vein of lead ore that exists in the exposed limestone of the Southern Outcrop in this region. All the sites are presently fenced off, but there are no known access restrictions, making it a popular location for experienced cavers.

The Rhymney Valley Ridgeway Walk, the Rhymney River Circular Walk and the Llwyn Hir Forestry Walk all meet up at Draethen.

The Hollybush pub in Draethen is closed for the forseeable future.
