= Abercarn =

- Location within Caerphilly
- Population: 5,446 (2021 census)
- OS grid reference: ST216947
- Community: Abercarn
- Principal area: Caerphilly
- Preserved county: Gwent
- Country: Wales
- Sovereign state: United Kingdom
- Post town: NEWPORT
- Postcode district: NP11
- Dialling code: 01495
- Police: Gwent
- Fire: South Wales
- Ambulance: Welsh
- UK Parliament: Newport West and Islwyn
- Senedd Cymru – Welsh Parliament: Casnewydd Islwyn
- List of places UK Wales Caerphilly 51.649°N 3.135°W Map of the community

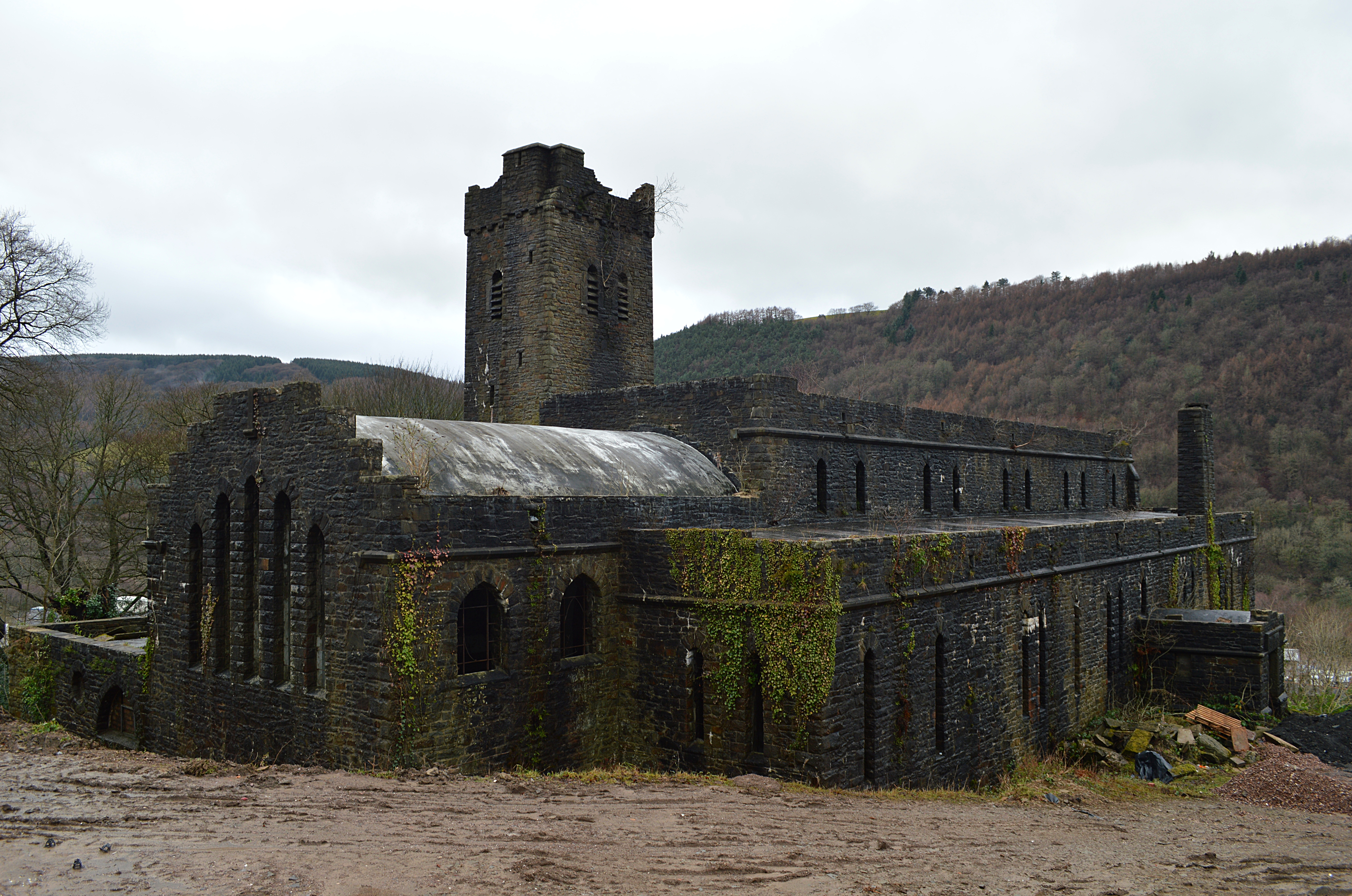
St Luke's Church, Abercarn

Abercarn (archaic: Abercarne, Aber-carn, Aber Carn) is a town and community in Caerphilly County borough, South East Wales which until 1972 existed in the historic county of Monmouthshire. It is ten miles (16 km) northwest of Newport on the A467 between Duffryn in Newport and Brynmawr. The town lies in the middle portion of the valley of the Ebbw River, which runs on the western side of it. And it is situated in the south-eastern flank of the once great coal mining region of the South Wales Valleys. (Note: One or more of the preceding sentences incorporates text from a publication now in the public domain: Chisholm, Hugh, ed. (1911). "Abercarn". Encyclopædia Britannica. Vol. 1 (11th ed.). Cambridge University Press. p. 43.) (Note: Jamesville, Abercarn:: OS grid ST2193 :: Geograph British Isles - photograph every grid square!)

== Toponymy ==
Osborne and Hobbs (1992) documented four previous names for what is currently known as Abercarn: Abergwyddon (C.19) (the town at the confluence of the Ebbw and the Gwyddon), Villa Treficarn Pont (c.942), Habercarne (1535), Abercarne (1690, 1928). They observed that, in contrast to its earliest known name, 'the first settlement in the area appears to have been farther down the valley, near the confluence of the Ebbw with the Carn brook (now Cwmcarn).' Also:

'The name Abercarn, appropriate to this site, appears subsequently to have been transferred to the early ironworks and then to the industrial village once with colleries, chemical and tinplatee works which grew up approximately one mile to the north.

There are early monastic associations as indicated by local place-names e.g. Chapel Farm and Pont Mynachlog and Abercarn "within the Lordship of Maghen" was a manor of Llantarnum Abbey. After the dissolution of the monasteries in 1535 much of the land in this manor comprised the Lordship of Abercarn(e).' (Osborne & Hobbs 1992, p. 8) (Note: Bradney (1993) documented that Sir Howel bestowed the Lordship of Abercarn on Llantarnam Abbey in 1175. (Bradney 1993, p. 134))

== History ==
=== Bronze age ===
Clark (1962) observed that looped socketed axes (Note: axe.) from the Bronze Age came from Abercarn.

=== Iron age ===
According the Portable antiquities scheme, an Iron age horse figurine was found in Abercarn sometime before the 1960s. A similar one was also found in nearby Pentwynmawr, dating from the same period.

=== 15th and 16th centuries ===
James (1969) wrote: 'Mr. Arthur Clarke [sic], in his Story of Monmouthshire (Note: Presumably The story of Monmouthshire. Vol.2, From the Civil War to present times by Arthur Clark. (Clark 1963)) refers to forges that were in existence since the year 1425.'

The Valor Ecclesiasticus, which was undertaken in 1535, identified Habercarne has having £23 2s 3d, an income associated with the estate of Llantarnam Abbey. According to the 1535/36 ministers accounts, Abercarne had six mills and a hundred and nineteen tenements. Out of the six mills, four were corn mills, one was a fulling mill and the other one was unspecified. One of the corn mills was located in the Gwyddon and another at Maestir (Plain Land). Jenkin ap Morgan who recorded the accounts was the bailiff for Mynyddislwyn. Henry VIII retained the estate:

'until 1539, when he leased it to John Parker, one of the squires of his stables, for an annual rent of 21/-. The accounts of his bailiff show that from the lands within the Lordship of Abercarn he derived a rental of £18/11/10/½.'

By the 1570s, there were also a small charcoal furnace in the Gwyddon Valley above Abercarn, which was associated with the Earl of Pembroke. Lawrence (2010) documented that in 1576 one Edmund Roberts, a London merchant, opened a charcoal burning furnance and forge, the first ironworks in the village.

=== 18th and 19th centuries ===
Welsh historian John Lloyd (1906) documented that in 1783 Joshua Glover and Samuel Glover (his son) of Birmingham, Warwick were operating 'on, or immediately adjacent to, the Ebbw main stream at Abercarne ... an important business'. The 'important business' was iron production. Newman (2000) observed that 'at Abercarn ... a tall, charcoal-fuelled blast furnace with charging-house survives. It is datable to the mid c18, and is thus the earliest well-preserved furnace in South Wales.' Newman documented, under the heading Blast Furnace: '½m. E, on the N slope of the Nant Gwyddon. The remains of a mid-c18 ironworking furnace, the earliest to survive fairly intact in the South Wales Coalfield.' Newman continued:

'Visible features are: one of the cast-iron beams supporting the top of the casting-arch; a low wall round the top of the furnace, from which an infilled arch spans to what remains of the charging-house, with a truncated masonry bridge-house. To the S is a feature which may be the top of either a broad charging-bank arch or a vaulted water-powered bellows chamber. Upstream 100 yards (100 metres) to the E is a fairly large pool impounded by a low masonry dam with stepped discharge weir. The original dam presumably powered a water wheel at the furnace, driving large bellows to provide the necessary draught.'

In 1783 Glover and his son also signed a contract with Anthony Bacon, Senior, of Cyfarthfa Ironworks to supply Abercarne Iron Works with 800 tons of pig iron a year. By 1808 only one of the Glovers survived, who Lloyd (1906) described as 'presumably the last surviving mamber of the firm'.

==== Coal mining ====
See Abercarn colliery disaster.
Newman (2000) observed that coalmining started at Abercarn: 'c.1836.' Further, 'Industry flourished from 1845, when Ebenezer Rogers (Note: Ebenezer Rogers was one of the founders of the South Wales Institute of Engineers (Roderick 1988).) opened the Abercarn and Gwyddon Collieries' and in 1862, when 'Abercarn's major colliery, the Prince of Wales was sunk in the valley bottom.' (Note: Post Office: Abercarn Royal Mail Sorting Office:: OS grid ST2194 :: Geograph British Isles - photograph every grid square!.)

On 11 September 1878, an underground explosion in Abercarn Colliery killed 268 coal miners.

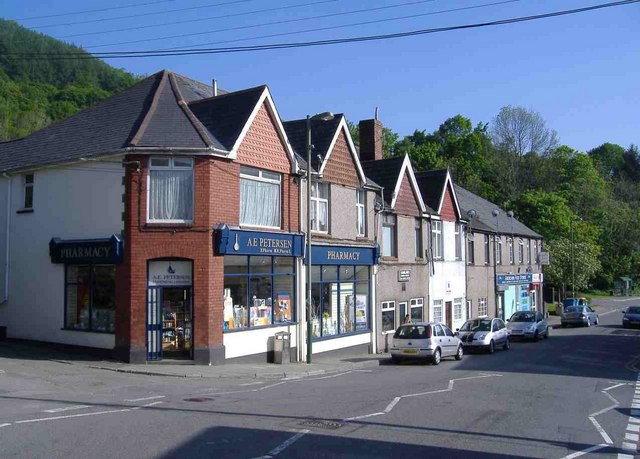
Abercarn High Street

== Religion ==
St Luke's Church, which was built by John Coates Carter, a striking stone and concrete church, is now redundant. It is a Grade II* listed building, described as "one of the most strikingly original churches built in Britain between the World Wars." Newman (2000) described it as 'By far the most theatrical of Coates Carter's churches ... 1923-6, its tower soaring high on a hill above the valley-bottom settlement.'

== Local government ==
The area was part of the ancient Monmouthshire parish of Mynyddislwyn until the late 19th century. In 1892, a local board of health and local government district of Abercarn was formed. (Note: Formed as Newbridge local board and local government district on 17 March 1892, renamed Abercarn on 4 July that year. County Census Report 1670, Monmouthshire.) This became Abercarn urban district in 1894, governed by an urban district council of twelve members. Under the Local Government Act 1972 the urban district was abolished in 1974, becoming part of the borough of Islwyn, Gwent. Further local government organisation in 1996 placed the area in the county borough of Caerphilly. The former urban district corresponds to the three communities of Abercarn, Crumlin and Newbridge.

== Sport ==
Abercarn is home to Abercarn Rugby Club which is a member of the Welsh Rugby Union, and to Abercarn United Football Club which plays in the Welsh Football League. It is also home to Abercarn Netball Club, which was founded in 2019 and is part of Wales Netball.

== Transport ==
=== Bus ===
The town is served by Stagecoach South Wales services including: the X15 (from Newport to Brynmawr) and the 151 gold (from Newport to Blackwood Interchange).

=== Rail ===
See Abercarn railway station.
The Monmouthshire Railway and Canal Company opened Abercarn railway station on 21 December 1850. Oliver and Airey (1873) documented that Abercarne had a railway station, the Railway being Monmouthshire and the Position being Newport and Crumlin. The station was closed in April 1962.

The town is currently served by Newbridge railway station and Crosskeys railway station, with the latter slightly the closer of the two. Both are approximately a four-minute drive or thirty minute walk from the town.

== Military ==
Following the formation of the Territorial Force in 1908, the Abercarn Territorial Cadet Company was formed within the wider Army Cadet Force. Following its formation the company was assigned to the 2nd Battalion, Monmouthshire Regiment. In 1912, the company was affiliated with the new formed 1st Cadet Battalion, The Monmouthshire Regiment.

== Notable people ==
Ironmaster Richard Crawshay, who had taken over the Cyfarthfa Ironworks after the death of Bacon in 1786, bought the freehold of the Abercarn estate from him. When the sale was completed, Crawshay immediately gave it to his son-in-law, Benjamin Hall, where he and his wife, Charlotte, Crawshay's second daughter, and their eldest son, five-year-old Benjamin came to live. The estate included two properties which were close to the river, a manor-house beside it and a small Georgian house on the wooded hill above it. Benjamin Hall Jr was to become 1st Baron Llanover, see Benjamin Hall, 1st Baron Llanover.

Hall became a Whig/Liberal politician and was a member of the House of Commons from 1831 to 1859. (Note: Hall was over 6 ft 4 in tall, from which the nickname Big Ben for the largest bell in the Elizabeth Tower of the Palace of Westminster was derived.) He was also a noted reformer in various sectors of society: social, church, health and local government. And he was married to Augusta Hall, Baroness Llanover, who became famous for her promotion of Welsh culture. Both Hall and his wife became members of Cymreigyddion y Fenni, the Abergavenny Welsh Society.

The surgeon Sir Clement Price Thomas (1893–1973) was born in Abercarn. He was famous for his 1951 operation on King George VI.

Australian-based drag performer, compere of Les Girls, actor and comedian Stan Munro (born 1941) was brought up and educated in Abercarn. He migrated to Australia in 1963.

== Education ==
Abercarn has two schools, Abercarn Primary School and Ysgol Gymraeg Cwm Gwyddon (Welsh Medium Education School). (Note: See also List of schools in Caerphilly County Borough.)

== External link ==
Welsh Coal Mines
