= Brithdir, Caerphilly =

Coordinates: 51.7098°N 3.2281°W

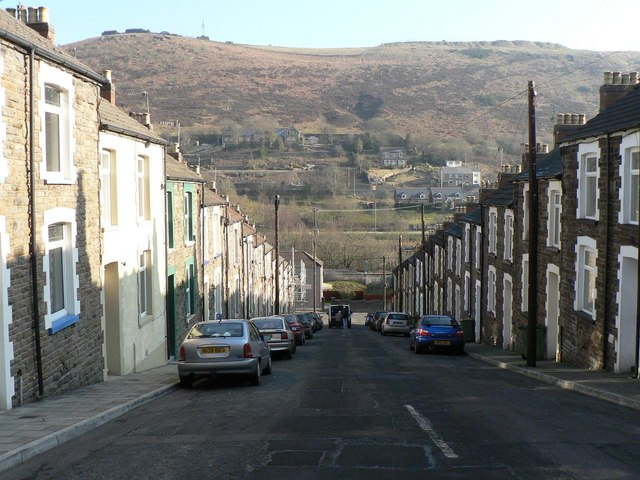
- Herbert Street, Brithdir
- OS grid reference: SO 152 019
- Community: New Tredegar
- Principal area: Caerphilly
- Preserved county: Gwent
- Country: Wales
- Sovereign state: United Kingdom
- Police: Gwent
- Fire: South Wales
- Ambulance: Welsh
- UK Parliament: Blaenau Gwent and Rhymney
- Senedd Cymru – Welsh Parliament: Caerphilly

Brithdir is a small village in the northern part of the Rhymney Valley near New Tredegar, in the county borough of Caerphilly, south Wales.

It was formed in the early twentieth century to provide housing for men working at the local coal mines including Elliot's colliery.

Centuries before Brithdir was constructed a stone was erected on the mountain top above the village to mark the burial place of Tegernacus, son of Martius. The stone, believed to have been placed in the 7th century, was originally in a field north west of Capel Brithdir. However, in 1922 the Tegernacus Stone was moved to the National Museum Cardiff, Now on display at the St Fagans Museum.

The village is served by Brithdir railway station.

Kieron Evans (born 2001), footballer for Newport County A.F.C., was born in Brithdir, but went to school in Bargoed.
