= Eglwysilan =

Coordinates: 51°35′34″N 3°17′28″W

Eglwysilan is an ecclesiastical parish and hamlet in Wales, within the community of Aber Valley in the unitary authority of Caerphilly County Borough.

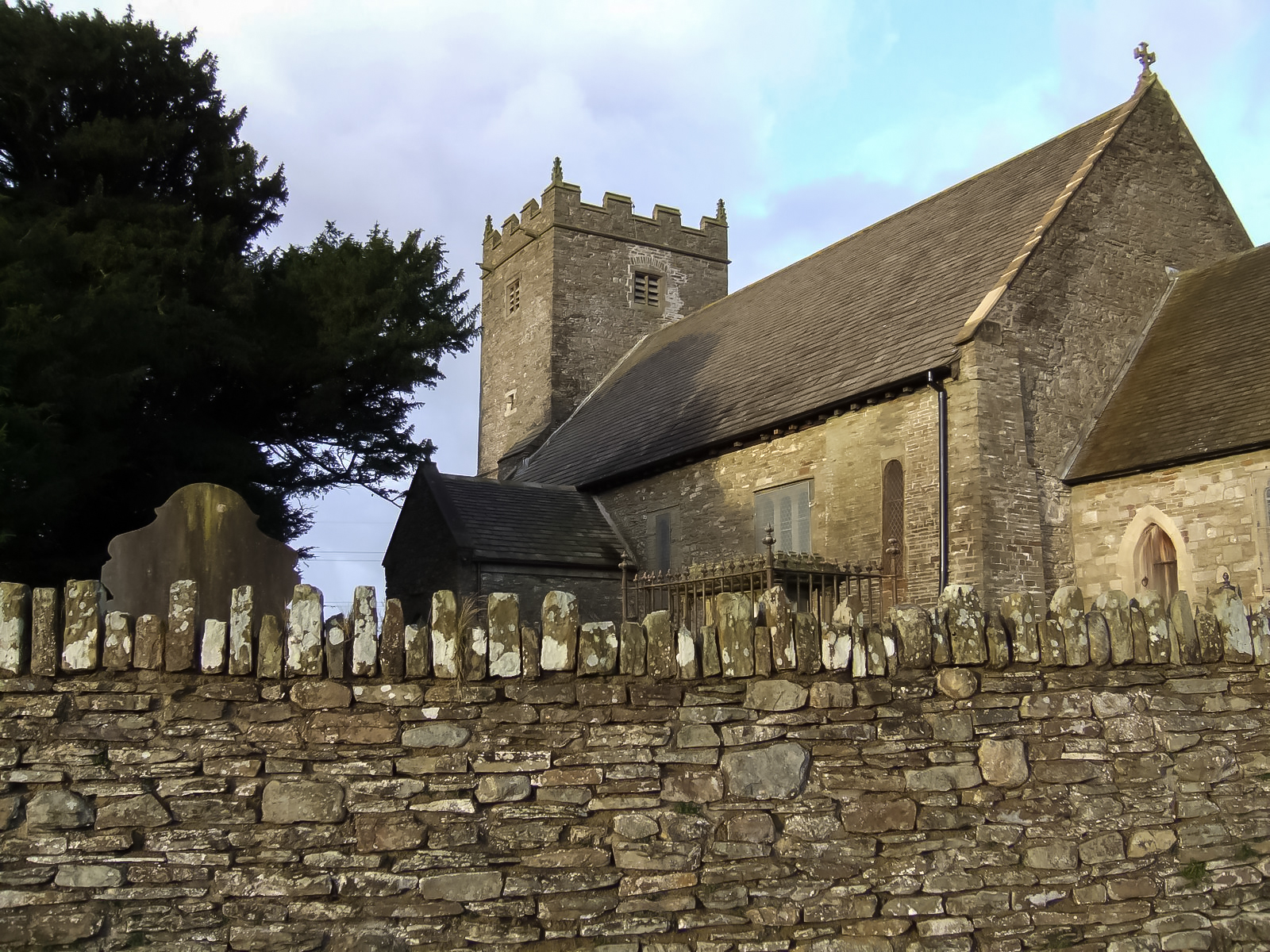
Eglwysilan Church

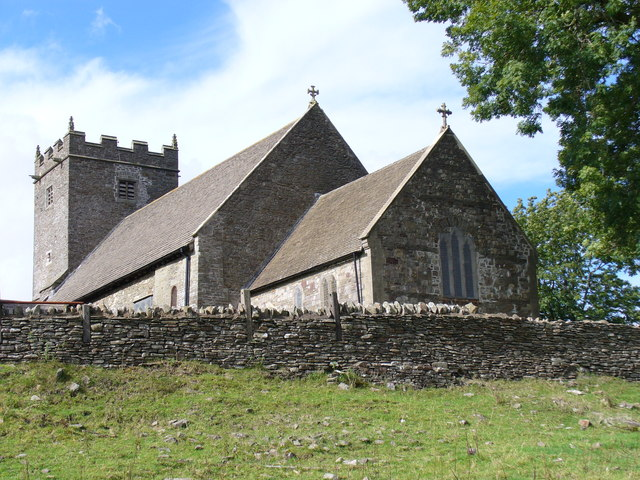
The Church at Eglwysilan

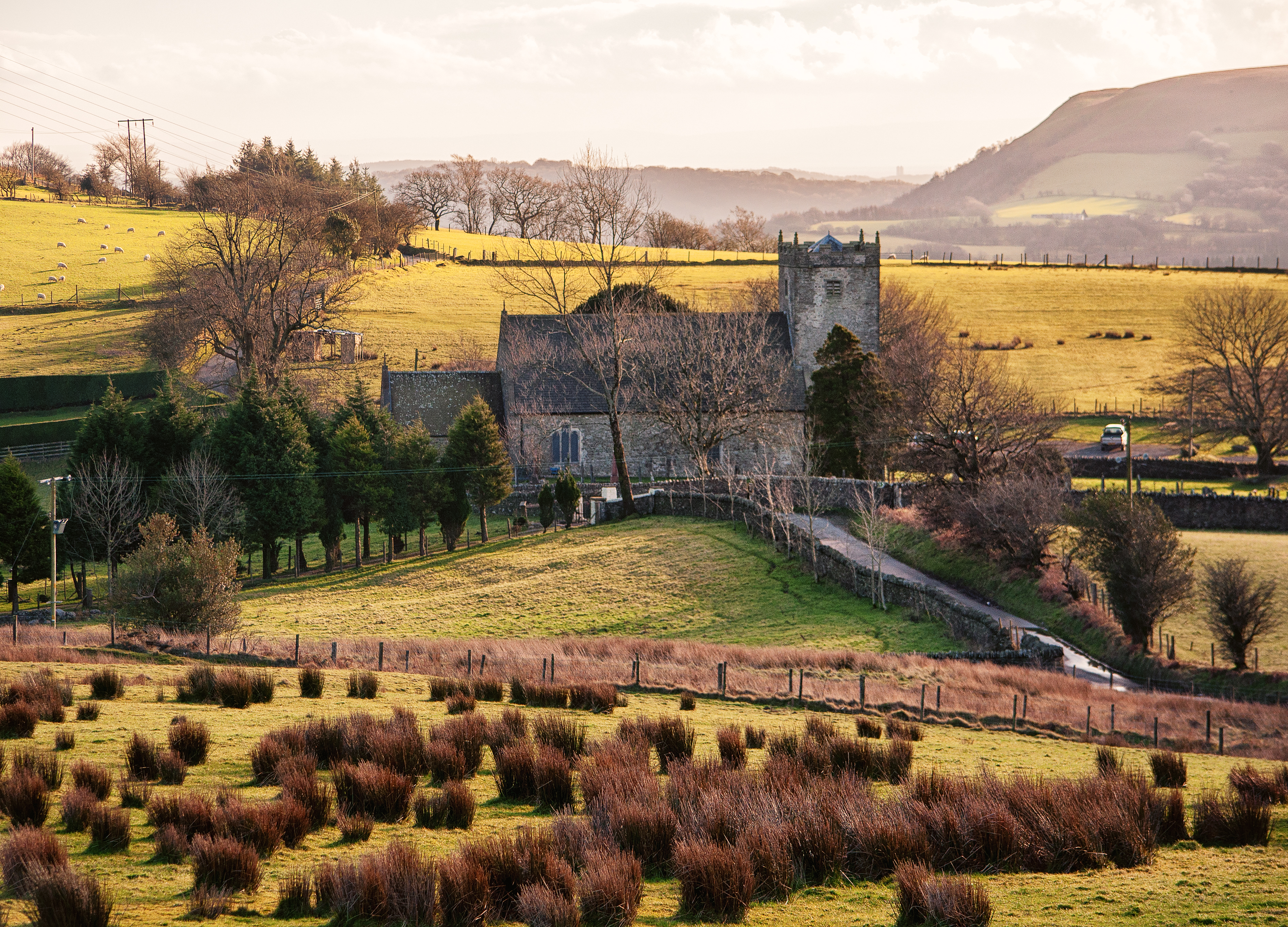
The church in its landscape

== History of the parish ==
During the 12th-century Norman invasion of Wales, the formal parish was defined – an area of more than 30,000 acres (47 mi^{2}; 120 km^{2}), including Caerphilly.

The parish church of Saint Ilan was built on the ridge between the Taff Valley and Aber Valley, on what was thought to have been the site of an earlier chapel or monastic cell. The parish website speculates that it may originally have been the home of a 6th-century monk. The site lies on the ancient pilgrimage route from Llantarnam to Penrhys.

Originally Roman Catholic, the church became Anglican following the Reformation led by Henry VIII. In due course, eleven Anglican parishes were founded from it, causing a reduction in the territory remaining with the mother church.

In 1801, the parish had dependent chapels at Llanfabon and St Martin. The resident population was reckoned to number 1885 people, 'residing in the hamlets of Eglwys Ilan, Ener Glynn, Glynn Tâff, Hendredenny, Parc, Rhyd y Byddin, and The Town of Caerphilly'. In 2012, the parish website stated the parish contained 8,000 people 'serving all of the Aber Valley and including the villages of Abertridwr and Senghenydd together with the hamlets of Eglwysilan and Groeswen'. The final service was held at the church on 17 December 2023, and its future is unclear.

The churchyard contains the grade II* listed tomb of the bridge builder William Edwards and many of the victims of the Senghenydd Colliery Disaster of 1913. Evan James, who wrote the lyrics of the Welsh national anthem, was baptised at the church.

== Identity of the patron saint ==
Note that this section discusses a saint whose name is Ilan with a capital i (Ilan), which could easily be confused with the Welsh term Llan (Llan), which commonly indicates a church or place named after a saint.

The dedication of the church is ambiguous. Its own website currently states it to be the church of 'Saint Ilan' (Ilan). Rice Rees offers the opinion that Ilan may have been an early Celtic saint of whom no other trace survives. The Cistercian Way website offers an unsourced tradition that Ilan may have been a pre-Norman bishop of Llandaf, and says that the 12th-century Book of Llandaf denotes the church at Eglwysilan as the resting place of the relics of Ilan.

Rees is sceptical of an 18th-century reference in Ecton's Thesaurus, which suggests that 'Ilan' is a corrupt form of Helen, mother of Constantine I; nevertheless, the post-reformation Roman Catholic parish erected to cover the same territory in the 20th century took the name of 'Saint Helen'. Although Rees acknowledges that the 4th-century noblewoman Elen Luyddog may have become confused with the Empress Helena in historical records, he does not explicitly suggest Elen as a candidate for the patronage of Eglwysilan.

In a text from 1801, the parish was said to be dedicated to 'Saint Elian'. There existed a 5th-century saint, Elian, active in north Wales and in Cornwall; Rees acknowledges his presence in north Wales under the name Elian Geimiad, but again, does not propose this saint as a patron of Eglwysilan.

== Notable people ==
- John Belcher (fl. 1721–1763) - Methodist preacher
- William Edwards (1719–1789) - minister and bridge builder. Built the Old Bridge, Pontypridd and Dolauhirion Bridge
- David Williams (1738–1816) - theologian and founder of the Royal Literary Fund.
- Thomas Pardoe (1770–1823) - porcelain painter buried in the churchyard.
