= Penyrheol, Caerphilly =

Area of Caerphilly, Wales

Coordinates: 51°35′23″N 3°14′21″W

Penyrheol is a residential area and electoral ward in Caerphilly, Wales. It is part of the community of Penyrheol, Trecenydd and Energlyn in the County Borough of Caerphilly. It is often spelt as Pen-yr-heol by the local community. At the 2011 census the population of the community was 12,537.

Penyrheol has one school, named Cwm-Ifor.

== Electoral ward ==
Penyrheol was an electoral ward to Mid Glamorgan County Council from 1989 to 1996, subsequently becoming a ward for Caerphilly County Borough Council.
