= Tir-Phil =

Village in Wales

Coordinates: 51.723°N 3.249°W

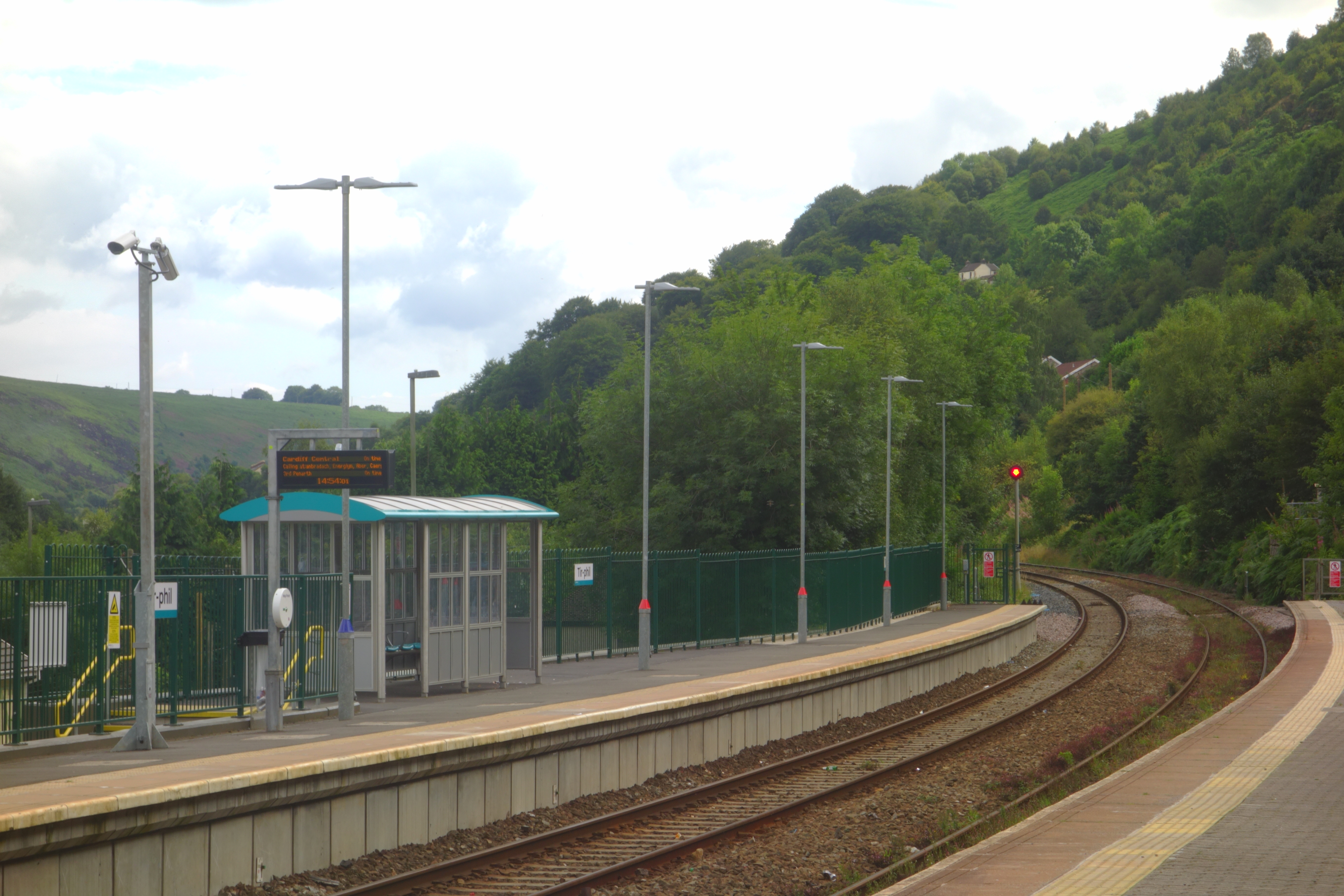
- Tir Phil Railway Station in the Rhymney Valley, Wales

- Location within Caerphilly
- Community: New Tredegar
- Principal area: Caerphilly
- Country: Wales
- Sovereign state: United Kingdom

Tir-Phil is a village in the community of New Tredegar in the Caerphilly county borough of south Wales. Historically Tir-phil was within the Parish of Gelligaer, in the county of Glamorgan.

517ft above the railway station is situated Capel-y-Brithdir, a Chapel of Ease dating back to at least the 14th Century. The church building on this site was burnt down in the 1950's. During demolition of the Chapel a stone from the 10th Century was found, which can now be found in the porch of St Gwladys' Church in Bargoed. The chapel's graveyard contains graves of people who lived in the farms of Tir-phil in the past.

The graveyard is partially circular in shape. Such enclosures have often been linked to Celtic Christian sites in Wales, which may hint at a pre-Norman religious settlement on this site; as might the name of the nearby stream, the Nant Llan. Across the road from the Chapel site can be found the location where the Tegernacus stone (dating from the 5th Century) was located, before it was taken to the National Museum of Wales. The stone was inscribed with the words "TEGERNACUS FILIUS MARTI HIC IACIT", which has been translated as Tegernacus, son of Martius, lies here.

The village of Tir-Phil and New Tredegar itself are served by Tir-Phil railway station.

Tir-Phil was also an electoral ward to Rhymney Valley District Council between 1973 and the council's dissolution in 1996.
