= Newbridge, Caerphilly =

Town in Caerphilly, Wales

Newbridge: Welsh: Trecelyn
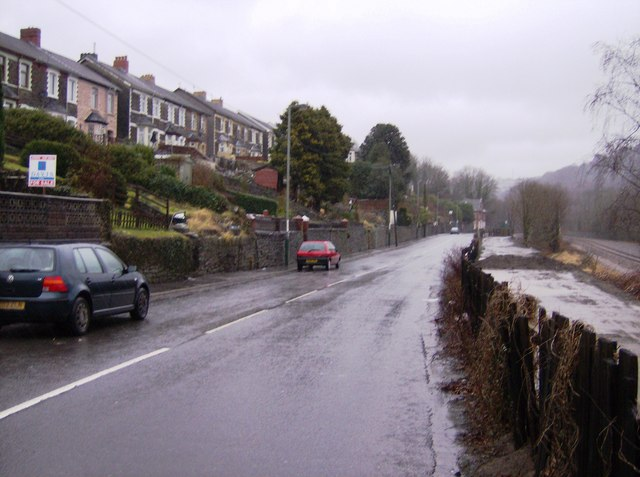

- Location within Caerphilly
- Population: 6,509 (2011 census)
- OS grid reference: ST215975
- Principal area: Caerphilly
- Preserved county: Gwent
- Country: Wales
- Sovereign state: United Kingdom
- Post town: NEWPORT
- Postcode district: NP11
- Dialling code: 01495
- Police: Gwent
- Fire: South Wales
- Ambulance: Welsh
- UK Parliament: Newport West and Islwyn
- Senedd Cymru – Welsh Parliament: Casnewydd Islwyn
- Website: https://www.caerphilly.gov.uk/
- List of places UK Wales Caerphilly 51.670°N 3.136°W Map of the community

Newbridge (Welsh: Trecelyn) is a town and community in the county borough of Caerphilly, south Wales. It lies within the historic boundaries of the county of Monmouthshire.

== Etymology ==
The Welsh placename for Newbridge is often incorrectly shown on OS Maps as Cefn Bychan. It is in fact Trecelyn, meaning "the town of the holly trees".

== History ==
The town is located within the historic boundaries of Monmouthshire, considered by some to be a part of England until the late 20th century.

In medieval times what are now the separate townships of Abercarn, Cwmcarn and Newbridge were known as Abercarne, a manorial title which goes back to the Norman period. Until quite recently the three townships were also within the boundaries of the ancient parish of Mynyddislwyn.

Newbridge, as its name implies, was the name of land around the "new bridge" built across the Ebbw River towards the end of the 18th century. Newbridge was then a predominantly Welsh agrarian community of rural farms and sheep pasture with a low population.

In the valley, the chief farms were Ty-Llydd, where the new vicarage now stands, Tynewydd, where the Newbridge Hotel stands, Ty-hir, the house which stands next to the Beaufort Arms, and the Newbridge corn mill which stood near the South Celynen Colliery. The modern road pattern did not exist—all activity and commerce took place along the mountain tracks, which led over Mynyddislwyn and Mynydd Maen. Adjacent to the tracks were the more prosperous farms, Hyfod Fach, Glanshon and Cillonydd.

== The coal-mining boom ==
Towards the end of the 18th century, Newbridge was established as a farming community around a new bridge across the Ebbw River. Like many towns in the area, it underwent a population explosion and socio-economic change with the arrival of coal mining in the 19th century. The mines attracted workers from the English West Country and West Midlands, Cornwall, Scotland, Mid Wales and further afield. The Celynen Collieries Workingmen's Institute, (the "Stute") and Memorial Hall (the "Memo") together became, like many miners' institutes, the communal heart of the town. The local collieries enjoyed a reputation for highly skilled miners, a productive workforce and non-radical politics, and the community had thriving shops, churches, chapels and sports teams.

== Modern Newbridge ==
Mining eventually ceased in the mid-1980s, after surviving the 1926 general strike, the 1930s Depression and post-war nationalisation, but became unsustainable following the UK miners' strike (1984-1985). The Institute became a drinking club.

Since the end of coal mining, new leisure facilities have been constructed in Newbridge. Residents have also reported the return to the area of birds such as herons, buzzards and kestrels.

After some delays, the Ebbw Valley Railway, originally running from Ebbw Vale Parkway (as of 17 May 2015 extended to Ebbw Vale Town) to Cardiff Central railway station, opened in February 2008. Newbridge is one of 8 stations on the line.

A bridge linking the main town of Newbridge with the school and leisure centre over the Ebbw River was completed at a cost of over £3 million and was opened by Joe Calzaghe and his father, Enzo Calzaghe in November 2009.

== Sport and leisure ==
Newbridge Rugby Union Football Club plays in the WRU Championship.

Newbridge Cricket Club play on the Welfare Ground and are a South Wales Premier League side, fielding 2 senior sides plus junior sides and a Women and girls side.

Newbridge Town AFC play in the 7th tier of Welsh football, the North Gwent Premier League, and were champions for the 2022/23 season.

Newbridge Boxing Club is the base of Team Calzaghe whose famous member Joe Calzaghe retired in 2009 as an undefeated world champion.

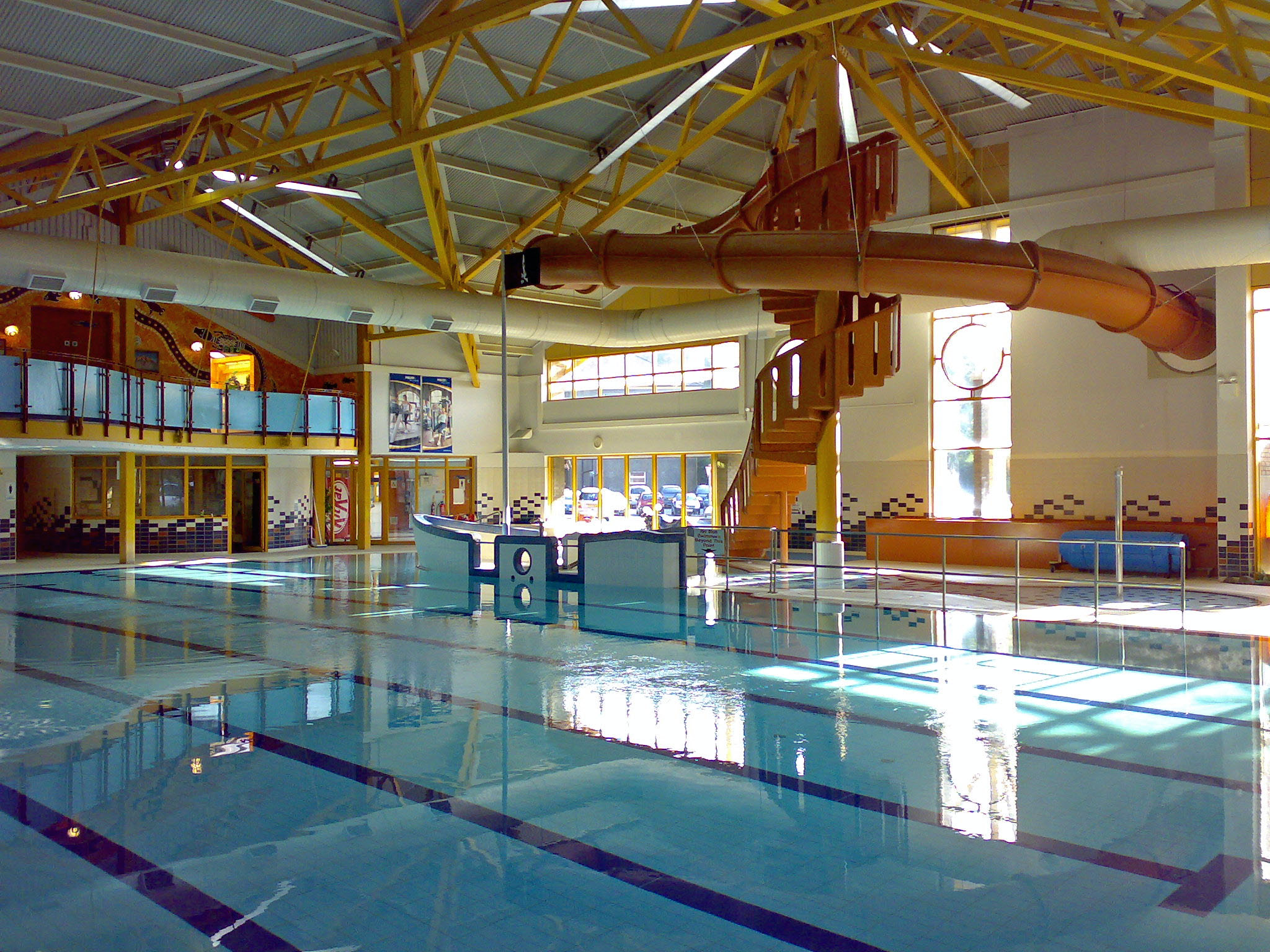
Newbridge Swimming Pool (photo 2007)

Newbridge has a public leisure centre which was opened in January 1997. The complex includes a swimming pool and a fitness suite which was enlarged from one to two floors in 2007. The second floor is a viewing area which looks over the pool.

=== Workingman's Institute & Memorial Hall ===
The Celynen Collieries' Institute (1908) and Memorial Hall (1925) on High Street, are both listed buildings, the Memo being Grade II*. The Institute is unusual as the miners themselves built it, borrowing the money through a private mortgage. The Memo was built to commemorate the 75 Newbridge men who died in the First World War. It is still the focus of Armistice Day and Remembrance Sunday activities every year. The Memo contains a ballroom with a sprung dance floor and an art deco auditorium which was designed to be both a theatre and a cinema. Both buildings now provide community facilities for local groups and societies, live music and community events but are both in urgent need of repair. After the mines closed, the Institute & Memorial Hall lost its income and became a drinking club. In 2004, when the local council was considering purchasing the land for a car park, a public meeting called by local MP Don Touhig led to the formation of The Friends of Newbridge Memo who got the buildings onto the BBC2 programme Restoration. They narrowly missed winning the final but received assistance from the Heritage Lottery Fund to begin the long process of raising money to restore both buildings. After a development grant was awarded by the Heritage Lottery Fund in summer 2009, Cadw and Caerphilly County Borough Council are actively supporting the scheme and the Big Lottery awarded £500,000 in December 2009. In July 2010 it was announced that the Heritage Lottery would grant the project £2.9 million to restore the buildings.

== Education ==
Newbridge Secondary School (formerly known as Newbridge Comprehensive School and Newbridge Grammar School before that) is located in the town, catering for ~1000 pupils aged 11 to 16. Tynewydd Primary School in Greenfield, Pantside Primary School, and Pentwynmawr Primary School cater for 4-11 year olds.

== Notable people ==
See also Category:People from Newbridge, Caerphilly

- Joe Calzaghe professional boxer
- Kim Simmonds of Savoy Brown
- Steve Strange, frontman of New Romantic band Visage; and Sir
- Terry Matthews, high-tech entrepreneur and owner of the Celtic Manor Resort
- John Dawes Welsh Rugby player
- Elliot Dee rugby player for Wales was born and raised in Newbridge.
