= Rudry =

Village and community in Wales

Coordinates: 51°34′N 3°10′W

Rudry: Welsh: Rhydri
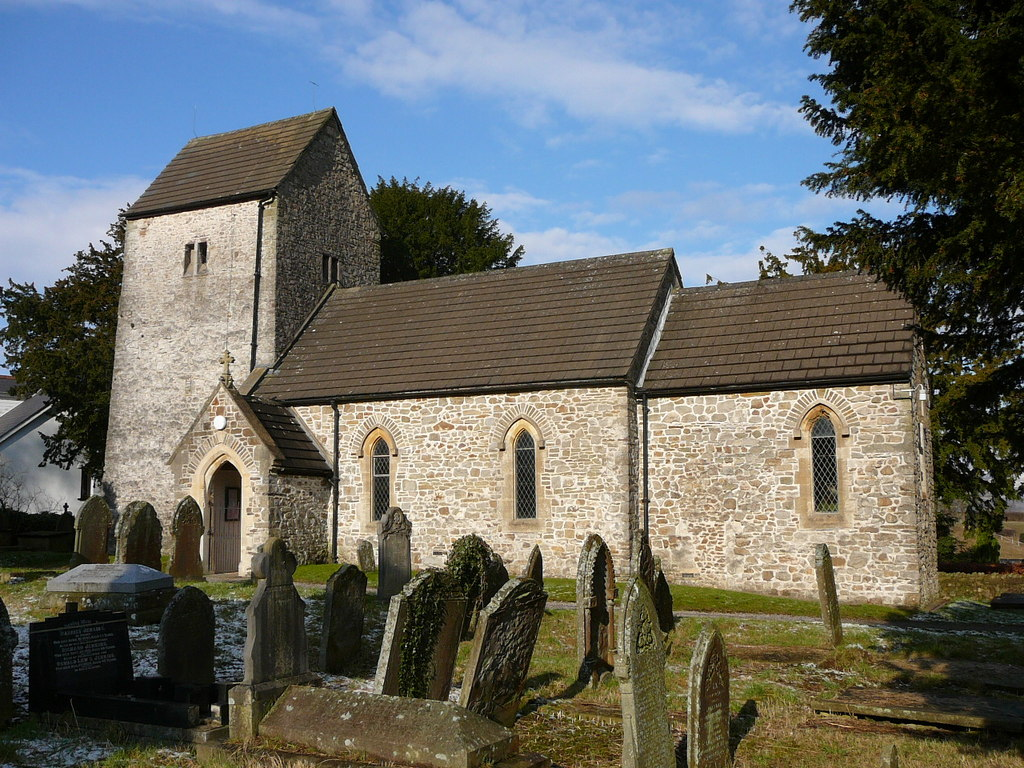
- St James' Church
- Country: Wales
- Sovereign state: United Kingdom
- Ambulance: Welsh
- List of places UK Wales Map of the community

Rudry (Welsh: Rhydri) is a small village and community located to the east of Caerphilly in Wales. As a community Rudry contains not only the village of Rudry, but also the villages and hamlets of Draethen, Garth and Waterloo. The population of the community at the 2011 census was 1,053.

== Description ==
The village is in a rural location, surrounded by wooded hills with walks along the Rhymney Valley Ridgeway Walk. The village's main attractions include the Maen llwyd Inn; the site of another historic public house, The Griffin; and the 13th-century St James's Church.

=== St James's Church ===
The church has existed since at least 1295 (731 years ago); it is thought that the site was home to a wayside shrine used by pilgrims for some time before this. The church is the centre of a local belief that Oliver Cromwell sought refuge in St James's during the Second English Civil War. While there is little evidence today to support this, it is known that Cromwell was actively leading forces in the area and that Charles I spent time at nearby Ruperra Castle. In the late eighteenth century the priest at St James's was one William Price. While Price was known as an eccentric in his own right, his son, William Price, gained great renown as a Chartist, Neo-druid, political activist, Welsh nationalist and as a pioneer of cremation.

== History ==
The community was formerly known as Yr-Yw-Dre (English: The Yew-tree Town), deriving from the large number of yew trees which are a feature of the hills surrounding the village. In the mid-nineteenth century, lead ore was extracted from the limestone hills surrounding Rudry, with miners being brought into the area from North Wales. The community was also served by two railway stations, Waterloo Halt and Fountain Bridge Halt, with each station served by trains travelling in one direction only. Both stations were closed in 1956. There is a small primary school, not far from the parish hall. The school was built in around 1902.

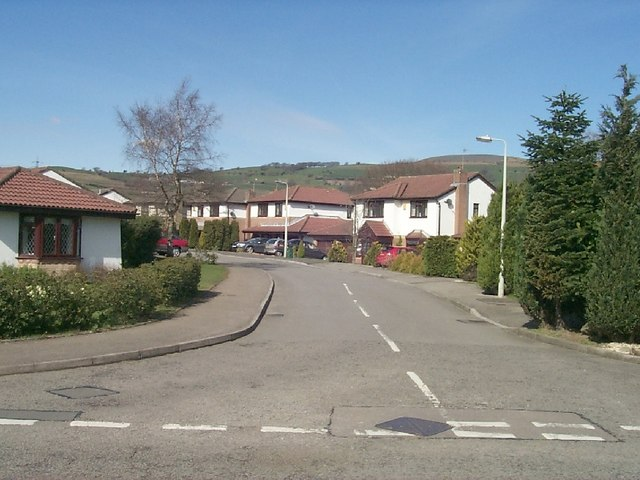
Rudry Close

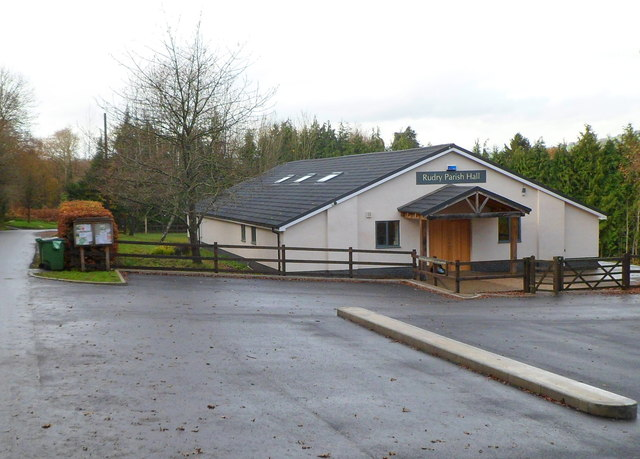
Rudry village hall
