= Gelligaer =

Coordinates: 51°40′N 3°15′W

- Community
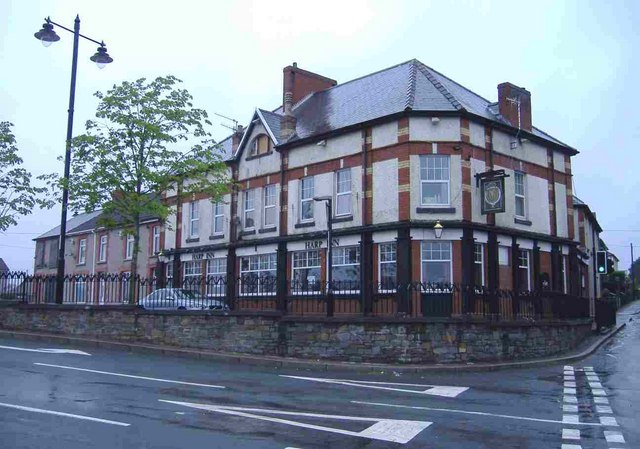
- Gelligaer, Harp Inn

- Location within Caerphilly
- Principal area: Caerphilly
- Country: Wales
- Sovereign state: United Kingdom
- Police: Gwent
- Fire: South Wales
- Ambulance: Welsh
- List of places UK Wales Caerphilly Map of the community

Gelligaer (Welsh: Gelli-gaer; Welsh pronunciation: [ˌɡɛɬɪˈɡaːɨr]) is a community in the County Borough of Caerphilly, Wales, in the Rhymney River valley. As well as the village of Gelligaer, the community also includes the small towns of Hengoed and Ystrad Mynach. The population of the community at the 2011 census was 18,408.

== History ==
Gelligaer is known for its stone Roman fort, part of a network within Roman Wales, believed to have been built between 103 and 111 A.D. and excavated in the early 20th century.

The parish church of St. Catwg (Cadoc) is ancient but heavily restored (with adult baptismal font) in the Victorian era. There is also an ancient standing stone north of the village.

== Governance ==
There are two tiers of local government covering Gelligaer, at community and county borough level: Gelligaer Community Council and Caerphilly County Borough Council. The community council is based at an office on Llwyn Onn in the Penpedairheol area of the community. Caerphilly County Borough Council also has its main offices in the community of Gelligaer, being at Penallta House in the Tredomen area of Ystrad Mynach.

Gelligaer was an ancient parish in the county of Glamorgan. It was included in the Merthyr Tydfil Poor Law Union from 1836. When elected parish and district councils were established under the Local Government Act 1894, Gelligaer was given a parish council and included in the Gelligaer and Rugos (or Rhigos) Rural District, which covered the parts of the Merthyr Tydfil Poor Law Union within Glamorgan that did not have urban authorities. The rural district was disbanded in 1908, with the parish of Gelligaer being made an urban district on 11 September 1908. It was created specifically as a result of the rapid population growth in the locality as a result of the expansion of the coal mining industry.

Gelligaer Urban District Council comprised 21 councillors including a chairman and the first elections were held on 30 September 1908. Following the initial election a third of the council stood down annually. The council, like other urban districts, was responsible for sanitation, sewerage, housing, streets, cemeteries, libraries, parks, and the licensing of public entertainments. The council was administered by a number of committees and by officers including a Clerk and Medical Officer of Health. The council established its offices on Park Road, opposite Hengoed railway station.

Gelligaer Urban District was abolished in 1974. The Bedlinog ward became a community in Merthyr Tydfil, whilst the rest of the former urban district became a community called Gelligaer within Rhymney Valley District in the new county of Mid Glamorgan. The community was divided in 1985, when separate communities were created for Bargoed and Darran Valley, the Pontlottyn area was transferred to the Rhymney community, and Ystrad Mynach (which had previously straddled the Gelligaer and Caerphilly communities) was united within Gelligaer. Further local government reorganisation in 1996 saw the abolition of Mid Glamorgan County Council, and Rhymney Valley merged with neighbouring Islwyn borough to become the Caerphilly County Borough.

== See also ==
Gelligaer Urban District Council election results, 1909-1939
