= 2012 Welsh local elections =

2012 local authority elections in Wales

- 3 May 2012

All 1,235 seats to 21 of 22 Welsh councils
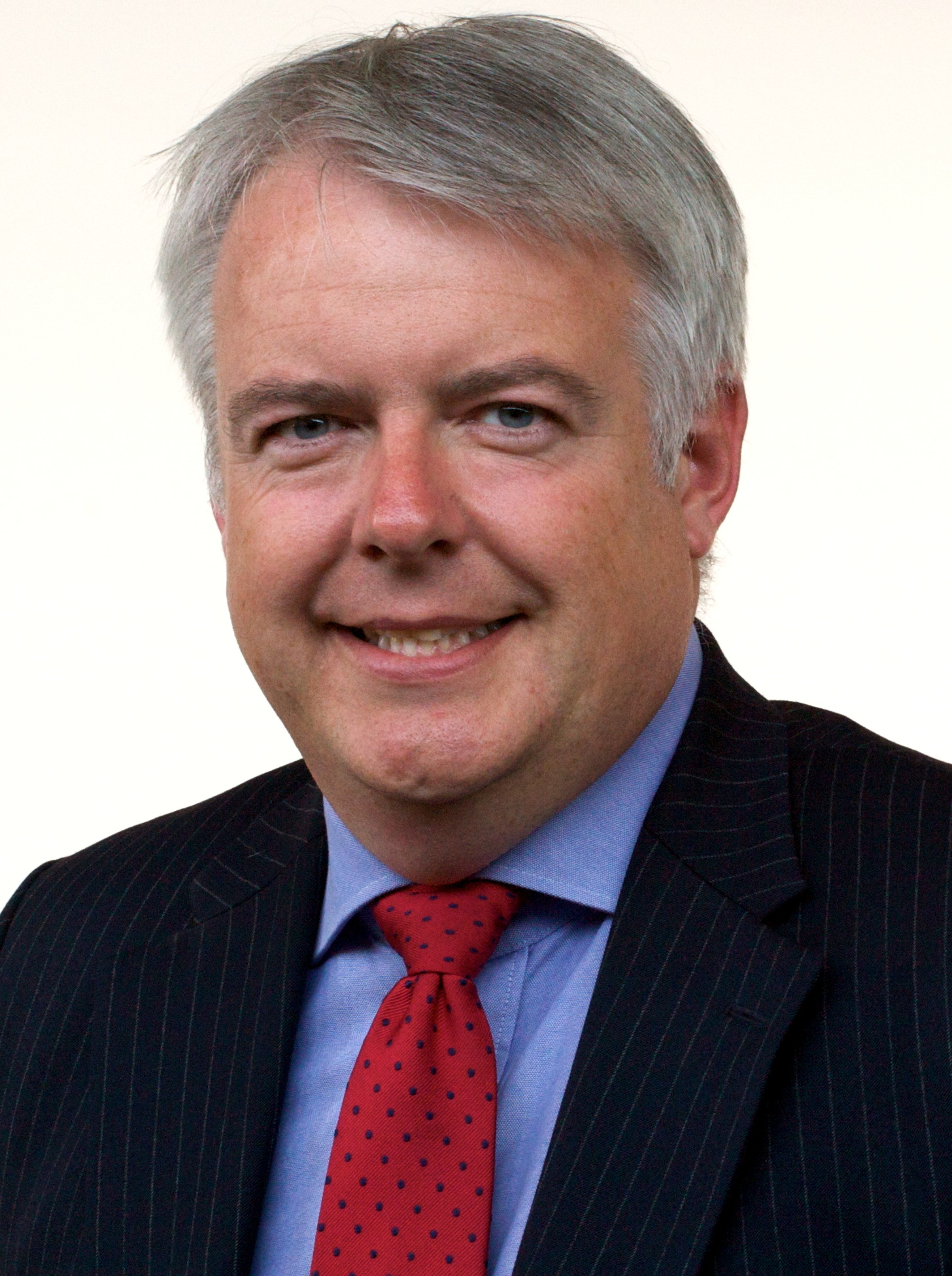

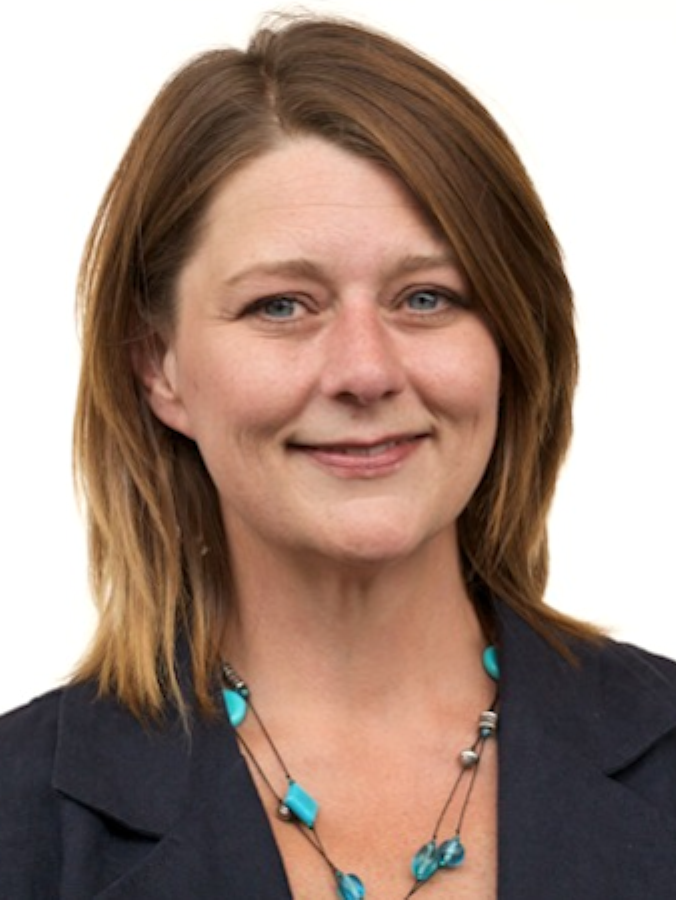

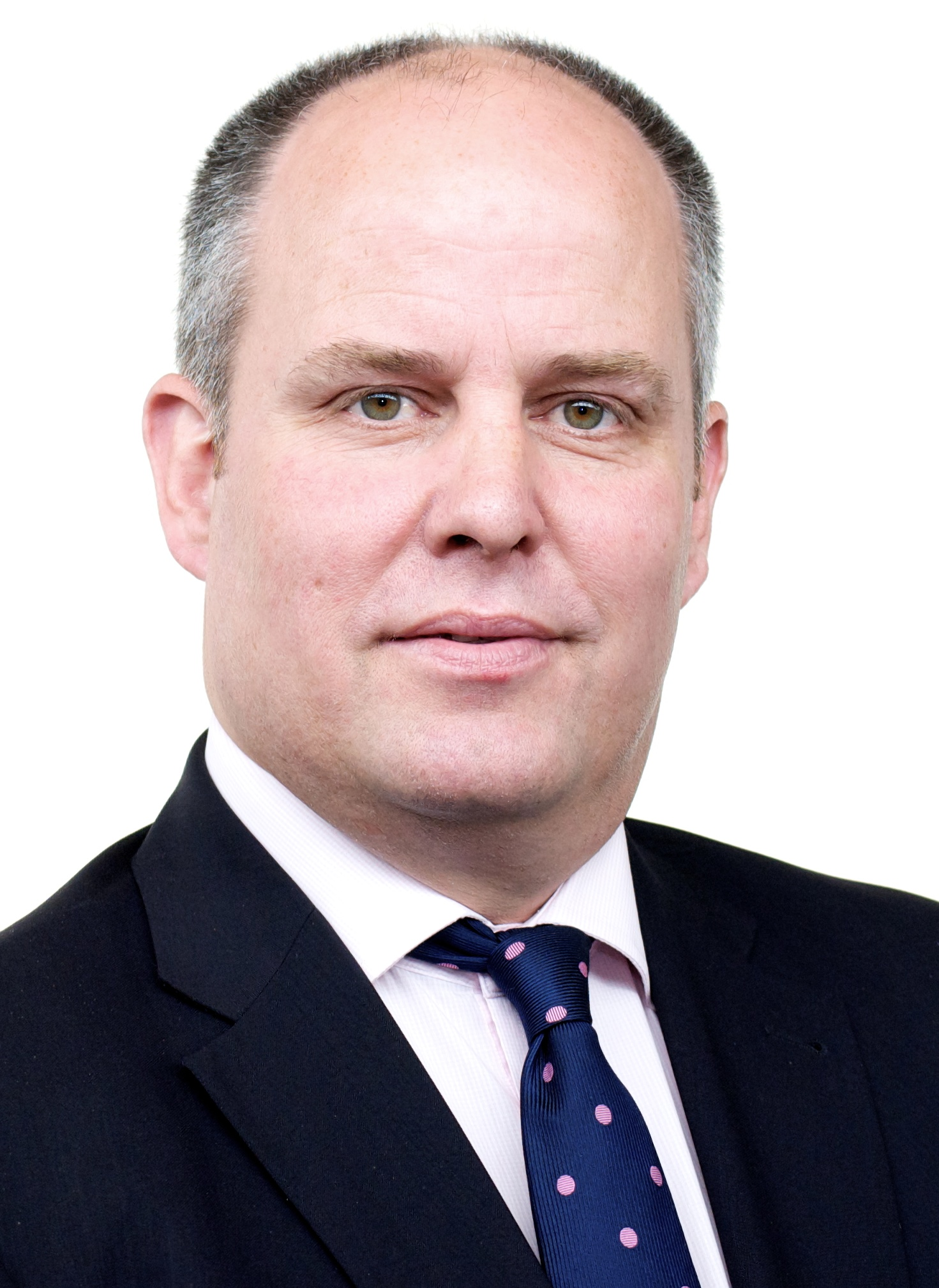

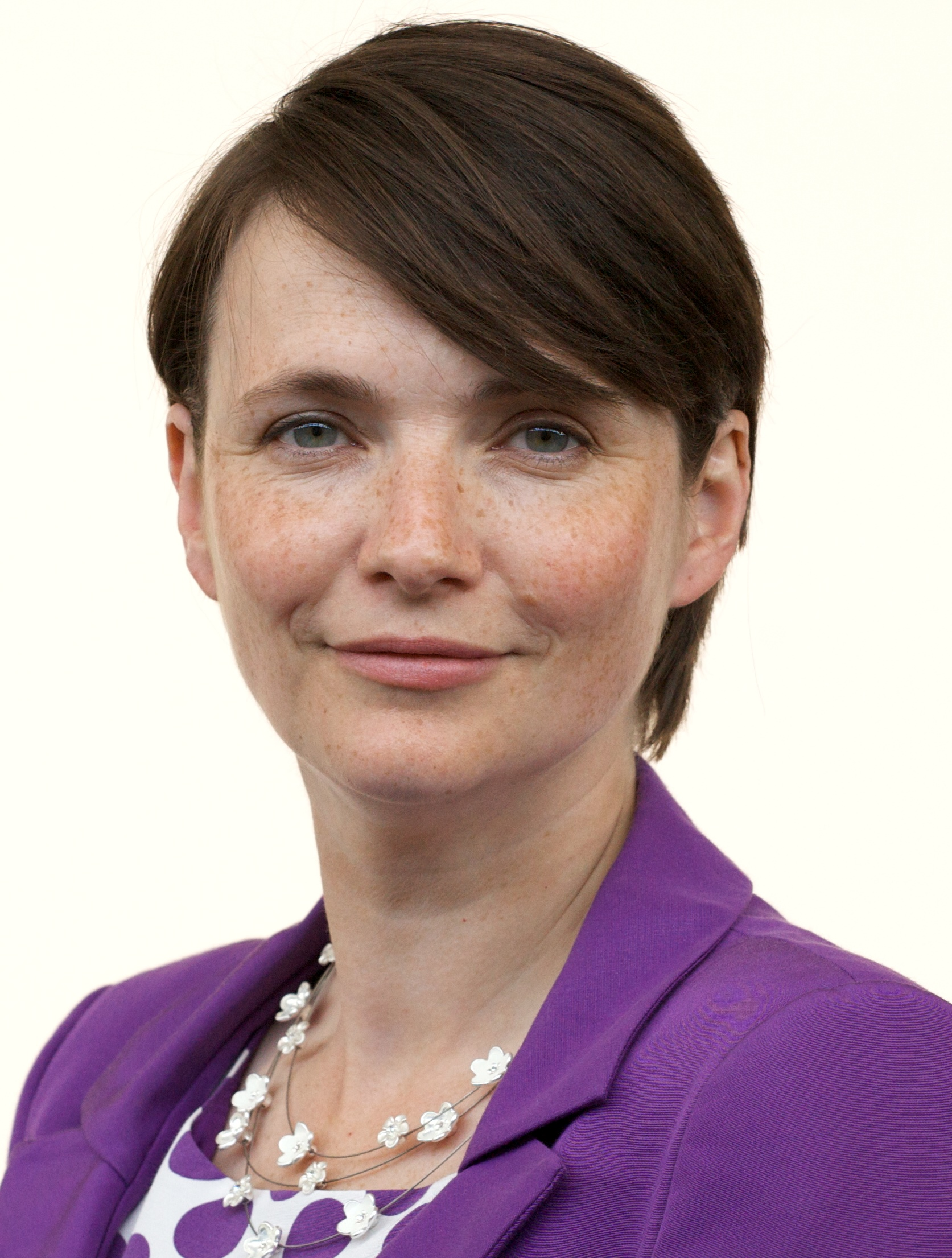
	First party	Second party
Leader	Carwyn Jones	Leanne Wood
Party	Labour	Plaid Cymru
Leader since	1 December 2009	16 March 2012
Last election	340 seats, 27.0%	198 seats, 16.7%
Seats won	577	158
Seat change	▲237	▼40
Popular vote	304,466	134,201
Popular vote (%)	35.6%	15.7%
Swing (pp)	▲8.6%	▼1.0%
	Third party	Fourth party
Leader	Andrew RT Davies	Kirsty Williams
Party	Conservative	Liberal Democrats
Leader since	14 July 2011	8 December 2008
Last election	172 seats, 15.9%	163 seats, 13.2%
Seats won	105	72
Seat change	▼67	▼92
Popular vote	108,580	68,619
Popular vote (%)	12.7%	8.0%
Swing (pp)	▼3.2%	▼5.2%
Colours denote the winning party with outright control (left), and the largest party by ward (right)
Key:
Labour
Independent
Plaid Cymru
Conservative
No Overall Control
No election held

Local elections in Wales were held on 3 May 2012 to elect members to twenty-one of the twenty-two local authorities, with the Isle of Anglesey having their election delayed to 2013. They were held alongside other local elections in the United Kingdom. The previous elections were held in 2008.

The Labour Party made gains at the expense of the other three major parties and of independents. Labour won majority control of ten councils—up eight from the 2008 local elections—while two remained under the control of independents and nine councils had no overall control.

The Welsh Government announced that elections for Anglesey council would be postponed to May 2013.

== Results ==
Party	Votes	%	+/-	Councils	+/-	Seats	+/-
Labour	304,466	35.6%	▲8.6%	10	▲8	577	▲237
Independent	201,110	23.5%	▲1.5%	2	▼1	286	▼25
Plaid Cymru	134,201	15.7%	▼1.0%	0	Steady	158	▼40
Conservative	108,580	12.7%	▼3.2%	0	▼2	105	▼68
Liberal Democrats	68,619	8.0%	▼5.2%	0	Steady	72	▼92
Green	10,310	1.2%	▲0.5%	0	Steady	0	Steady
UKIP	2,552	0.3%	▲0.1%	0	Steady	2	▲2
Other	25,542	3.0%	▼1.3%	0	Steady	25	▼15
No overall control	n/a	n/a	n/a	9	▼5	n/a	n/a

For comparative purposes, the table above shows changes since 2008 excluding Anglesey, which was not up for election.

== Councils ==
Council	2008 result	2012 result	Details
Blaenau Gwent	No overall control	Labour gain	Details
Bridgend	No overall control	Labour gain	Details
Caerphilly	No overall control	Labour gain	Details
Cardiff	No overall control	Labour gain	Details
Carmarthenshire	No overall control	No overall control hold	Details
Ceredigion	No overall control	No overall control hold	Details
Conwy	No overall control	No overall control hold	Details
Denbighshire	No overall control	No overall control hold	Details
Flintshire	No overall control	No overall control hold	Details
Gwynedd	No overall control	No overall control hold	Details
Merthyr Tydfil	Independent	Labour gain	Details
Monmouthshire	Conservative	No overall control gain	Details
Neath Port Talbot	Labour	Labour hold	Details
Newport	No overall control	Labour gain	Details
Pembrokeshire	Independent	Independent hold	Details
Powys	Independent	Independent hold	Details
Rhondda Cynon Taff	Labour	Labour hold	Details
Swansea	No overall control	Labour gain	Details
Torfaen	No overall control	Labour gain	Details
Vale of Glamorgan	Conservative	No overall control gain	Details
Wrexham	No overall control	No overall control hold	Details

=== Isle of Anglesey ===
Elections to the Isle of Anglesey County Council were postponed for a year, to May 2013, because of a review of electoral arrangements for the island. The result of the postponed election saw the Independents lose their majority, with Plaid Cymru hoping to form a coalition with Labour.

== Opinion polling ==
Date(s) conducted	Polling organisation/client	Sample size	Lab	Con	PC	Lib Dem	Others	Lead
3 May 2012	2012 Welsh local elections	853,593	36.0%	12.8%	15.8%	8.1%	27.3%	20.2%
12-16 Apr 2012	YouGov	1039	48%	17%	14%	7%	14%	31%
1 May 2008	2008 Welsh local elections	950,216	27.0%	15.9%	16.7%	13.2%	28.2%	11.1%
