= 2017 Welsh local elections =

- 4 May 2017

All 1,254 seats to 22 Welsh councils
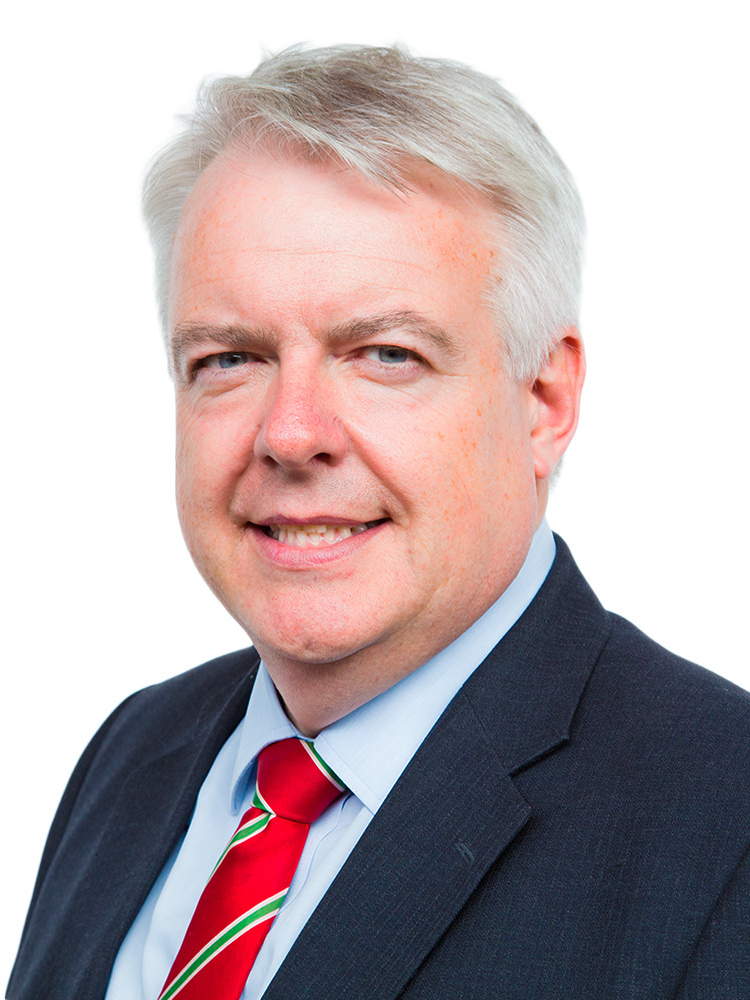

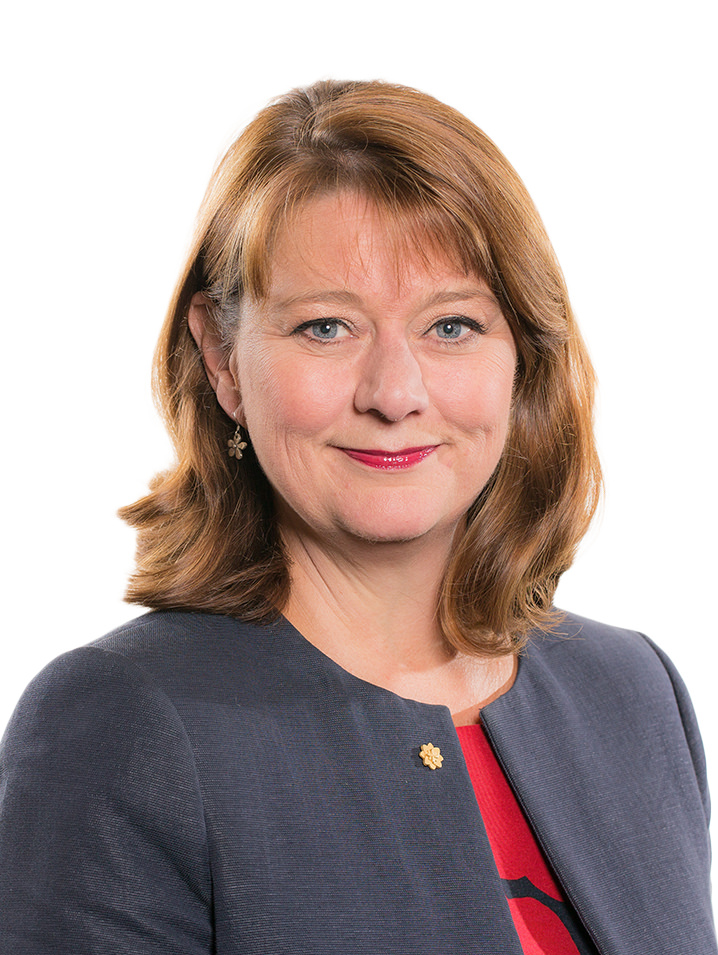

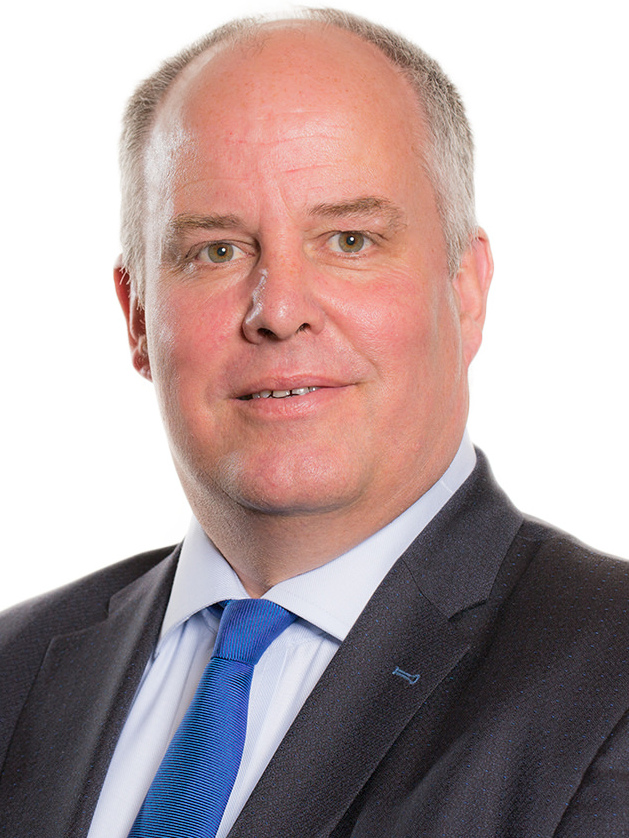

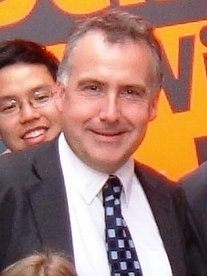
| | First party | Second party |
|---|---|---|
| Leader | Carwyn Jones | Leanne Wood |
| Party | Labour | Plaid Cymru |
| Leader since | 1 December 2009 | 16 March 2012 |
| Last election | 580 seats, 34.9% | 170 seats, 16.1% |
| Seats won | 468 | 208 |
| Seat change | ▼112 | ▲38 |
| Popular vote | 294,989 | 160,519 |
| Percentage | 30.4% | 16.5% |
| Swing | ▼4.5% | ▲0.5% |
| | Third party | Fourth party |
| Leader | Andrew RT Davies | Mark Williams |
| Party | Conservative | Liberal Democrats |
| Leader since | 14 July 2011 | 7 May 2016 |
| Last election | 105 seats, 12.5% | 73 seats, 8.0% |
| Seats won | 184 | 63 |
| Seat change | ▲79 | ▼10 |
| Popular vote | 182,520 | 66,022 |
| Percentage | 18.8% | 6.8% |
| Swing | ▲6.3% | ▼1.2% |
Colours denote the winning party with outright control (left), and the largest party by ward (right)
Key:
Labour
Independent
Plaid Cymru
Conservative
No Overall Control
No election held

Local elections in Wales were held on 4 May 2017 to elect members to the twenty-two local authorities. They were held alongside other local elections in the United Kingdom. This included the Isle of Anglesey, which was previously up for election in 2013 due to having its elections delayed for a year. Community council elections also took place on the same day. Apart from Anglesey, the last elections were held in 2012. Normally these elections take place every four years, but the 2017 elections were postponed for a year in order to avoid clashing with the 2016 Welsh Assembly election, which itself had been postponed by a year to avoid clashing with the 2015 general election.

Welsh Labour incurred a net loss of 112 council seats, losing control of the Blaenau Gwent, Merthyr Tydfil and Bridgend councils. Labour did, however, retain control of Cardiff, Swansea, Newport, and five other councils. The Welsh nationalist party Plaid Cymru saw a net gain of 38 seats and retained control of Gwynedd Council, while also falling just short of controlling Carmarthenshire County Council. The Welsh Conservatives saw a net gain of 79 seats, and gained control of one council, Monmouthshire. The Conservatives also became the largest party in Vale of Glamorgan and Denbighshire. In ten of the 22 councils, no party had overall control of the council.

== Background ==
In the last local elections in Wales in 2012 (including a delayed election for the Isle of Anglesey County Council in 2013), 1,265 councillors were elected across Wales. The Labour Party won 580, independents won 307, Plaid Cymru won 170, the Conservatives won 105 and the Liberal Democrats won 73. Other parties, including the UK Independence Party, won 30 seats. Ahead of the 2017 elections, Labour were defending 536 seats and control of ten of the twenty-two Welsh local authorities. Plaid Cymru was defending 177 seats, and the Conservatives was defending 103 seats. The Liberal Democrats were defending 75 seats, having "made a net gain of three council seats as a result of by-elections and defections" since 2012. The Wales Green Party was defending a single seat.

Labour had suffered defections among its Welsh councilors prior to the 2017 elections. In September 2014, ten Labour councillors on the Wrexham County Borough Council left the Labour Party and quit the Labour council group. In August 2016, the councilor for Splott, Cardiff left Labour. In November 2016, Labour lost two of its Cardiff councillors in two days, with the Llandaff North councillor resigning from the council because of a "culture of bullying" and the Adamsdown councillor leaving the Labour group to sit as an independent after he was not re-selected to run in 2017. In 2015, control of Carmarthenshire Council was lost to a Plaid Cymru led coalition, whilst in 2016 the party also lost control of Maesteg Town Council for the first time since it was created in 1974 after the de-selection of several Bridgend Labour county councillors.

A total of 1,159 seats were up for election in the 2017 Welsh local elections. Labour fielded 910 candidates, the Conservatives 621 candidates, Plaid Cymru 549 candidates, the Liberal Democrats 280 candidates, UKIP 80 candidates, and the Greens 78 candidates. Additionally, more than 870 people ran as independent or candidates for other parties. 10.4% of wards were uncontested with almost a hundred candidates running unopposed. In one ward, Yscir in Powys, no candidate filed to run. The election for that ward was deferred until the 21 June 2017, when it was won by the Conservatives. Elections in the wards in Cyfarthfa, Merthyr Tydfil and Llandyfriog, Ceredigion were postponed following the deaths of local candidates.

== Eligibility to vote ==
All registered electors (British, Irish, Commonwealth and European Union citizens) who are aged 18 or over on polling day are entitled to vote in the local elections. A person who has two homes (such as a university student who has a term-time address and lives at home during holidays) can register to vote at both addresses as long as they are not in the same electoral area, and can vote in the local elections for the two different local councils.

Individuals had to be registered to vote by midnight twelve working days before polling day (13 April 2017). Anyone who qualifies as an anonymous elector had until midnight on 25 April 2017 to register.

The 2017 Welsh local elections were to be the last local elections to be held before widespread changes by the Welsh Government under the Local Government & Elections (Wales) Bill. The Bill extends voting rights to 16 and 17 year olds and foreign citizens living in Wales, and makes it easier to register voters for future local elections. Around 1,900 prisoners would also be eligible to vote for the first time.

== Wales-wide results ==
| Party | Votes | % | +/- | Councils | +/- | Seats | +/- |
|---|---|---|---|---|---|---|---|
| Labour | 294,989 | 30.4% | ▼4.5% | 7 | ▼3 | 468 | ▼112 |
| Independent | 218,817 | 22.5% | ▼1.3% | 3 | ▲1 | 309 | ▲2 |
| Conservative | 182,520 | 18.8% | ▲6.3% | 1 | ▲1 | 184 | ▲79 |
| Plaid Cymru | 160,519 | 16.5% | ▲0.5% | 1 | ▲1 | 208 | ▲38 |
| Liberal Democrats | 66,022 | 6.8% | ▼1.2% | 0 | Steady | 63 | ▼10 |
| Green | 12,441 | 1.3% | ▲0.2% | 0 | Steady | 1 | ▲1 |
| UKIP | 11,006 | 1.1% | ▲0.3% | 0 | Steady | 0 | ▼2 |
| Other | 24,594 | 2.5% | ▼0.3% | 0 | Steady | 21 | ▼7 |
| No overall control | n/a | n/a | n/a | 10 | ▲1 | n/a | n/a |

For comparative purposes, the table above shows changes since 2012 including Anglesey's council, which was last elected in 2013.

The Labour Party had a net loss of 112 council seats, and also lost control of the Blaenau Gwent and Bridgend councils. Labour did, however, retain control of Cardiff, Swansea, Newport, and five other councils. The Welsh nationalist Plaid Cymru had a net gain of 38 seats and won control of the Gwynedd Council (the council had shifted to Plaid control in June 2012, and is counted in the table above as a 'gain'); it also fell just short of controlling the Carmarthenshire County Council. The Conservatives had a net gain of 79 seats, and won control of one council, Monmouthshire; the Conservatives also became the largest party in Vale of Glamorgan and Denbighshire. The Wales Green Party won their first county council seat in Powys. In ten of the 22 councils, no party had overall control of the council.

== Principal councils ==
| Council | Seats | Previous control | Result | Details |
|---|---|---|---|---|
| Isle of Anglesey | 30 | No overall control | No overall control | Details |
| Blaenau Gwent | 42 | Labour | Independent | Details |
| Bridgend | 54 | Labour | No overall control (Labour minority) | Details |
| Caerphilly | 73 | Labour | Labour | Details |
| Cardiff | 75 | Labour | Labour | Details |
| Carmarthenshire | 74 | No overall control | No overall control (Plaid/Independent coalition) | Details |
| Ceredigion | 42 | No overall control | No overall control (Plaid/Independent coalition) | Details |
| Conwy | 59 | No overall control (Plaid Cymru/Labour/LibDem/Independent coalition) † | No overall control (Independent/Conservative coalition with LibDem support) | Details |
| Denbighshire | 47 | No overall control (Plaid Cymru/Independent/Conservative coalition) ‡ | No overall control (Independent/Conservative coalition) | Details |
| Flintshire | 70 | No overall control | No overall control (Labour minority) | Details |
| Gwynedd | 75 | Plaid Cymru†† | Plaid Cymru | Details |
| Merthyr Tydfil | 33 | Labour | Independent | Details |
| Monmouthshire | 43 | No overall control | Conservative | Details |
| Neath Port Talbot | 64 | Labour | Labour | Details |
| Newport | 50 | Labour | Labour | Details |
| Pembrokeshire | 60 | Independent | Independent | Details |
| Powys | 73 | Independent | No overall control (Independent/Conservative coalition) | Details |
| Rhondda Cynon Taff | 75 | Labour | Labour | Details |
| Swansea | 72 | Labour | Labour | Details |
| Torfaen | 44 | Labour | Labour | Details |
| Vale of Glamorgan | 47 | No overall control (Labour/Llantwit coalition) | No overall control (Conservative/Independent coalition) | Details |
| Wrexham | 52 | No overall control | No overall control (Independent/Conservative coalition) | Details |
| Total | 1,271 | | | |

† In 2014, the only Welsh Liberal Democrat cabinet member defected to Welsh Labour, meaning the Lib Dems were no longer part of the coalition. In 2015, several Independent councillors created their own group within the council called Conwy First. This group later on went to support the council instead of the remaining five independent councillors, meaning the current coalition is made up of Plaid Cymru, Welsh Labour and Conwy First.

‡ The Welsh Liberal Democrats have since lost its only seat on the Council, therefore leaving the coalition.

†† Plaid Cymru at the original election won exactly half the seats available, they took control of the council by winning the final seat in a delayed election in June 2012.

== Community & town councils ==
Elections were held for around 8,000 seats on over 730 community and town councils across Wales.

The 2017 Local Government Elections data revealed that over 64% of community council seats in Wales were elected uncontested. Only two Principal Council areas had over 50% contested seats. Bridgend had the lowest amount of uncontested seats, with 28%. In comparison, Cardiff had the highest amount of uncontested seats with 74%.

Over half (55 per cent) of community councillors were aged 60 or above. 1.2 per cent of community councillors were non-white and around 65 per cent of candidates were male. 15 per cent considered themselves to have a disability. Ahead of the 2022 elections, the Welsh Government established an 'Independent Review Panel on Community and Town Councils' which in October 2018 made a series of recommendations to improve future candidate diversity and address the large number of uncontested seats.

== Opinion polling ==
| Date(s) conducted | Polling organisation/client | Sample size | Lab | PC | Con | LDem | Green | UKIP | Others | Lead |
|---|---|---|---|---|---|---|---|---|---|---|
| 4 May 2017 | 2017 Election Results | 970,908 | 30.4% | 16.5% | 18.8% | 6.8% | 1.3% | 1.1% | 25.1% | 11.6% |
| 19-21 Apr 2017 | YouGov | 1,029 | 28% | 19% | 26% | 7% | NA | 8% | 12% | 2% |
| 3 May 2012 | 2012 Election Results | 853,593 | 34.9% | 16.1% | 12.5% | 8.0% | 1.2% | 0.3% | 27% | 20.2% |

NA = Not asked.
