= 2008 Welsh local elections =

Election held in Wales in 2008

- 1 May 2008

All 1,270 seats to 22 Welsh councils
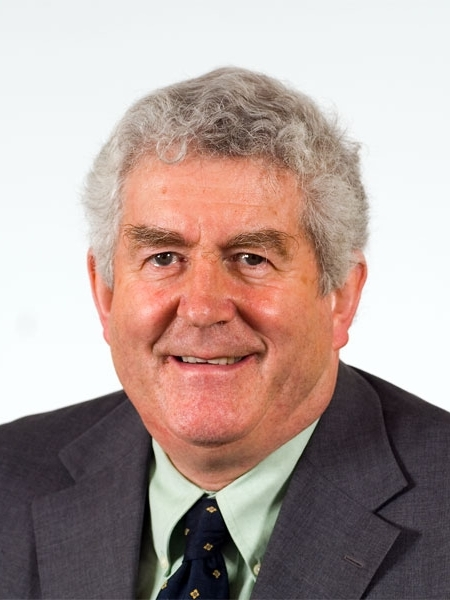

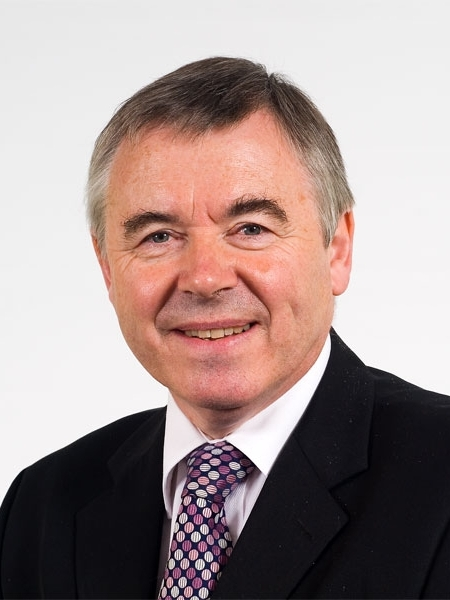

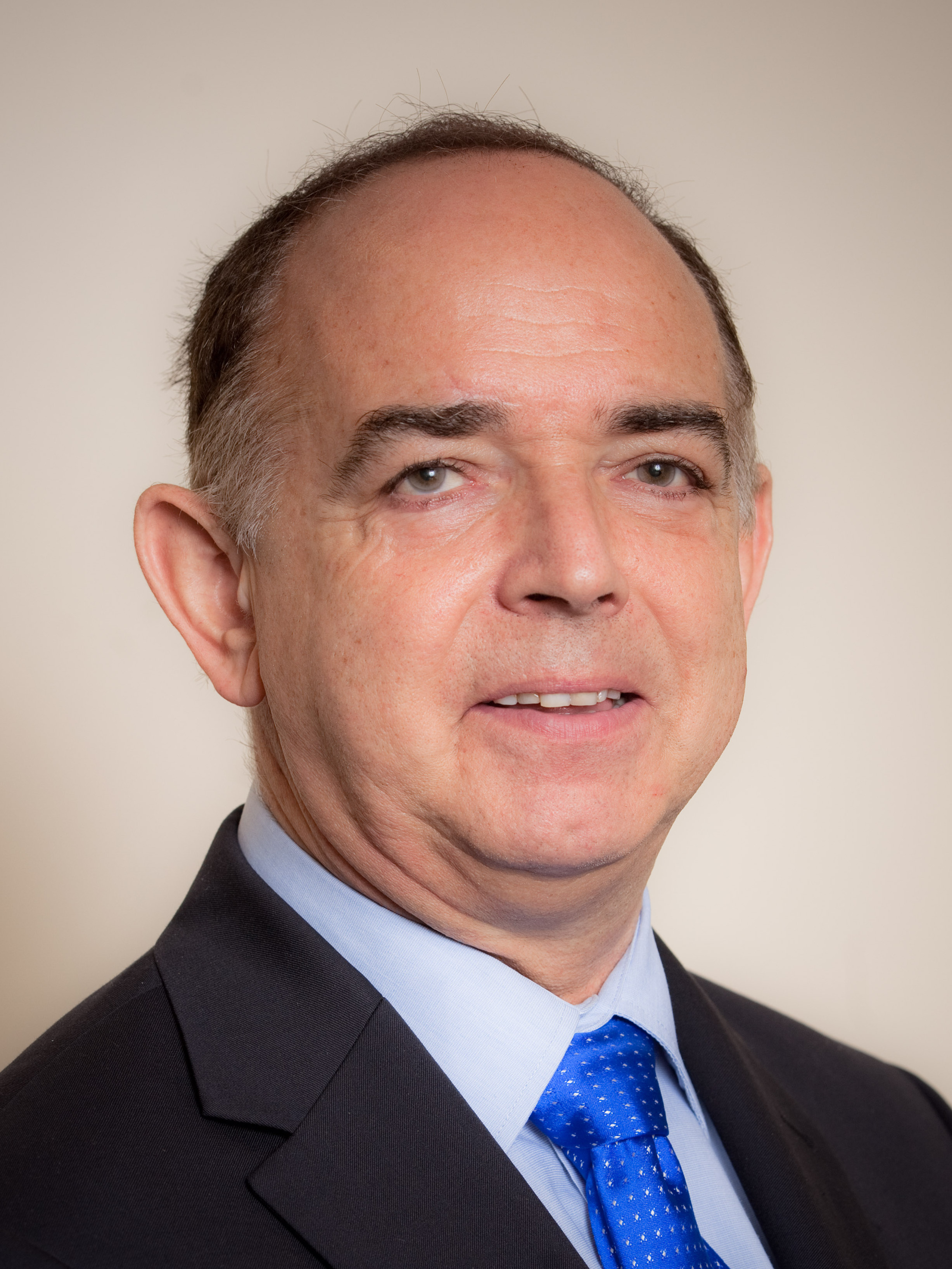

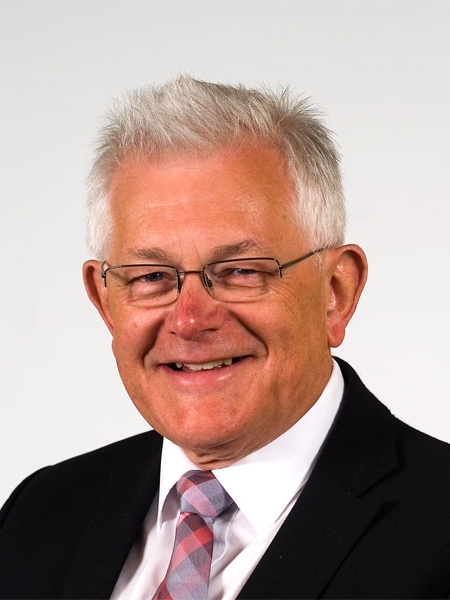
	First party	Second party
Leader	Rhodri Morgan	Ieuan Wyn Jones
Party	Labour	Plaid Cymru
Leader since	11 February 2000	3 August 2000
Last election	479 seats, 30.6%	175 seats, 16.4%
Seats won	345	206
Seat change	▼134	▲31
Popular vote	253,029	159,847
Popular vote (%)	26.6%	16.8%
Swing (pp)	▼4.0%	▲0.4%
	Third party	Fourth party
Leader	Nick Bourne	Michael German
Party	Conservative	Liberal Democrats
Leader since	18 August 1999	13 October 2007
Last election	107 seats, 11.0%	146 seats, 13.9%
Seats won	174	165
Seat change	▲67	▲19
Popular vote	148,708	123,175
Popular vote (%)	15.6%	13.0%
Swing (pp)	▲4.6%	▼0.9%
- Colours denote the winning party with outright control (left), and the largest party by ward (right)

Local elections in Wales were held on 1 May 2008 to elect members to the twenty-two local authorities. They were held alongside other local elections in the United Kingdom. The previous elections were held in 2004.

== Results ==
Party	Votes	%	+/-	Councils	+/-	Seats	+/-
Labour	253,029	26.6%	▼4.0%	2	▼6	345	▼134
Independent	217,369	22.9%	▲0.3%	4	▲1	334	▲13
Plaid Cymru	159,847	16.8%	▲0.4%	0	▼1	206	▲31
Conservative	148,708	15.6%	▲4.6%	2	▲1	174	▲67
Liberal Democrats	123,175	13.0%	▼0.9%	0	Steady	165	▲19
Blaenau Gwent PV	9,187	1.0%	▲1.0%	0	Steady	8	▲8
Llais Gwynedd	7,119	0.7%	▲0.7%	0	Steady	13	▲13
Green	6,568	0.7%	▼0.5%	0	Steady	0	Steady
Other	25,214	2.7%	▼1.6%	0	Steady	19	▼17
No overall control	n/a	n/a	n/a	14	▲5	n/a	n/a

== Councils ==
In all 22 Welsh councils the whole of the council was up for election.

Council	Previous control	Result	Details
Blaenau Gwent	Labour	No overall control gain	Details
Bridgend	No overall control	No overall control hold	Details
Caerphilly	Labour	No overall control gain	Details
Cardiff	No overall control	No overall control hold	Details
Carmarthenshire	No overall control	No overall control hold	Details
Ceredigion	No overall control	No overall control hold	Details
Conwy	No overall control	No overall control hold	Details
Denbighshire	No overall control	No overall control hold	Details
Flintshire	Labour	No overall control gain	Details
Gwynedd	Plaid Cymru	No overall control gain	Details
Isle of Anglesey	Independent	Independent hold	Details
Merthyr Tydfil	Labour	Independent gain	Details
Monmouthshire	Conservative	Conservative hold	Details
Neath Port Talbot	Labour	Labour hold	Details
Newport	Labour	No overall control gain	Details
Pembrokeshire	Independent	Independent hold	Details
Powys	Independent	Independent hold	Details
Rhondda Cynon Taff	Labour	Labour hold	Details
Swansea	No overall control	No overall control hold	Details
Torfaen	Labour	No overall control gain	Details
Vale of Glamorgan	No overall control	Conservative gain	Details
Wrexham	No overall control	No overall control hold	Details
