= 2008 Flintshire County Council election =

2008 Welsh local government election

Results of the 2008 Flintshire County Council election

The 2008 Flintshire County Council election took place on 1 May 2008 to elect members of Flintshire County Council, the council of the county of Flintshire in Wales. This was on the same day as the other 2008 United Kingdom local elections. The previous council election took place in 2004 and the following election was held in 2012.

In the election, the Labour Party lost control of the council to no overall control.

== Results ==
Party	Seats	Change
Independent	27	▲9
Labour	22	▼15
Liberal Democrats	11	▲1
Conservative	9	▲5
Plaid Cymru	1	Steady

== See also ==
- 2008 Welsh local elections
