= 2012 Caerphilly County Borough Council election =

2012 Welsh local government election

← 2008	3 May 2012	2017 →

All 73 seats to Caerphilly County Borough Council 37 seats needed for a majority
	First party	Second party	Third party
	Lab	Pla	Ind
Leader	Harry Andrews	Allan Pritchard	N/A
Party	Labour	Plaid Cymru	Independent
Leader's seat	Gilfach	Penmaen	N/A
Seats before	32	32	9
Seats won	50	20	3
Seat change	▲18	▼12	▼6
Popular vote	N/A	N/A	N/A
Percentage	N/A	N/A	N/A
- Map showing the results of the 2012 Caerphilly County Borough Council election. Red showing Welsh Labour, Green showing Plaid Cymru & grey showing independent candidates.
Council control before election
Welsh Labour
Council control after election
Welsh Labour

The 2012 Caerphilly County Borough Council election took place on 3 May 2012 to elect members of Caerphilly County Borough Council in Wales. This was on the same day as other Welsh local elections.

== Election results ==
The Labour Party won control of the council from Plaid Cymru, after gaining an additional 18 seats. Four council candidates were elected unopposed.

Among the notable Plaid Cymru defeated councillors were the current mayor, Vera Jenkins (Crumlin ward) and Ron Davies, the ex-Labour Secretary of State for Wales (Bedwas, Trethomas and Machen ward).

Caerphilly County Borough Council Election 2012
Party	Seats	Gains	Losses	Net gain/loss	Seats %	Votes %	Votes	+/−
Labour	50			+18	68.5	51.0	23,886	+13.7
Plaid Cymru	20			-12	27.4	29.8	13,970	-6.5
Independent	3			-6	4.1	14.7	6,906	-2.9
TUSC	0			0	0.0	0.4	174	New
Liberal Democrats	0			0	0.0	0.3	121	-1.9
Communist	-			-	-	-	-	-0.2
