= Donna Cushing =

Welsh politician

Donna Cushing MS
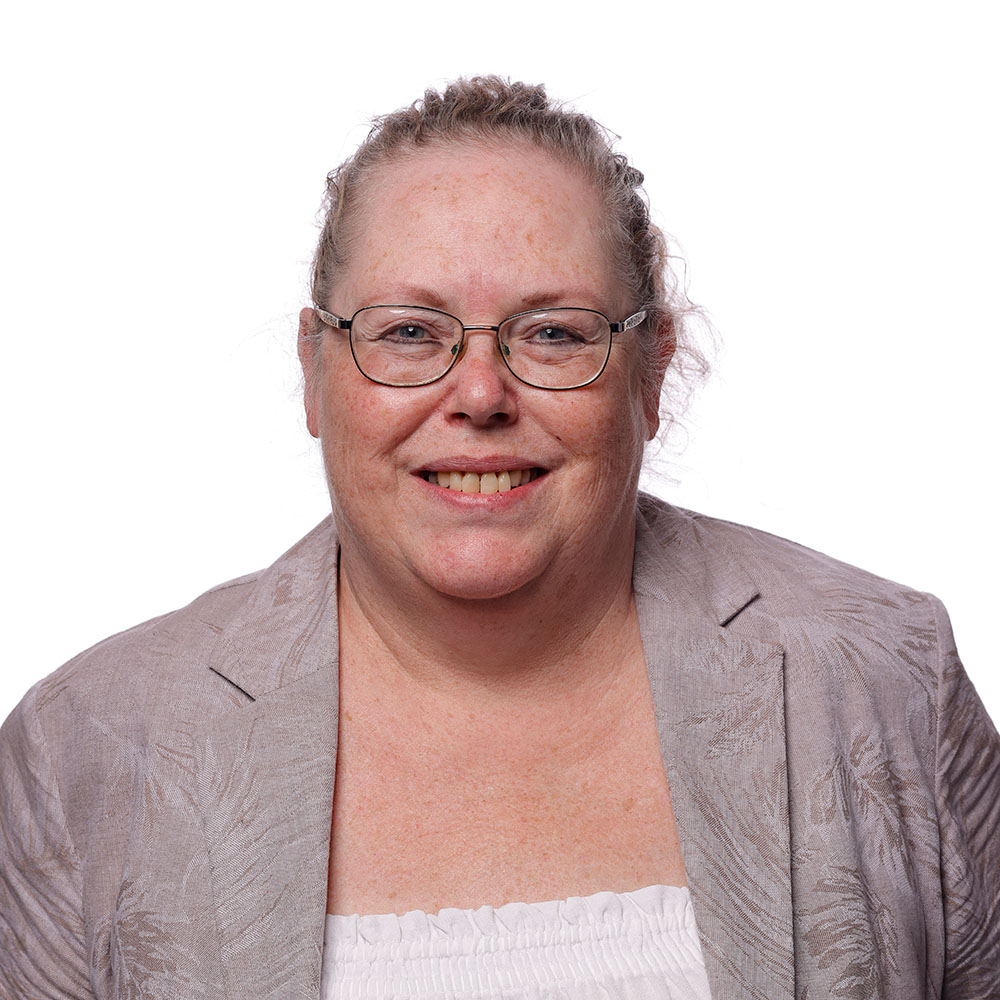
- Official portrait, 2026

Member of the Senedd
- Incumbent
- Assumed office 8 May 2026
- Constituency: Sir Fynwy Torfaen

Personal details
- Born: 1966 or 1967 (age 58–59)
- Party: Plaid Cymru

Donna Cushing (born 1966 or 1967) is a Welsh Plaid Cymru politician serving as a Member of the Senedd (MS) for Sir Fynwy Torfaen since 2026.

== Biography ==
Cushing comes from a family of miners in the Rhymney Valley. Her mother was a cousin of Aneurin Bevan. Donna Cushing was candidate for Gwent Police and Crime Commissioner in 2021 and 2024. She represented Hengoed ward on Caerphilly County Borough Council, being elected in 2017 and 2022.

== Political career ==
In the 2026 Senedd election, Cushing was elected as a MS for the Sir Fynwy Torfaen constituency.
