= 2017 Caerphilly County Borough Council election =

2017 Welsh local government election

- 4 May 2017

All 73 seats to Caerphilly County Borough Council 37 seats needed for a majority
	First party	Second party	Third party
Leader	David Poole	Colin Mann	N/A
Party	Labour	Plaid Cymru	Independent
Leader's seat	Pengam	Llanbradach	N/A
Seats before	50	20	3
Seats won	50	18	5
Seat change	0	▼2	▲2
Popular vote	N/A	N/A	N/A
Percentage	N/A	N/A	N/A
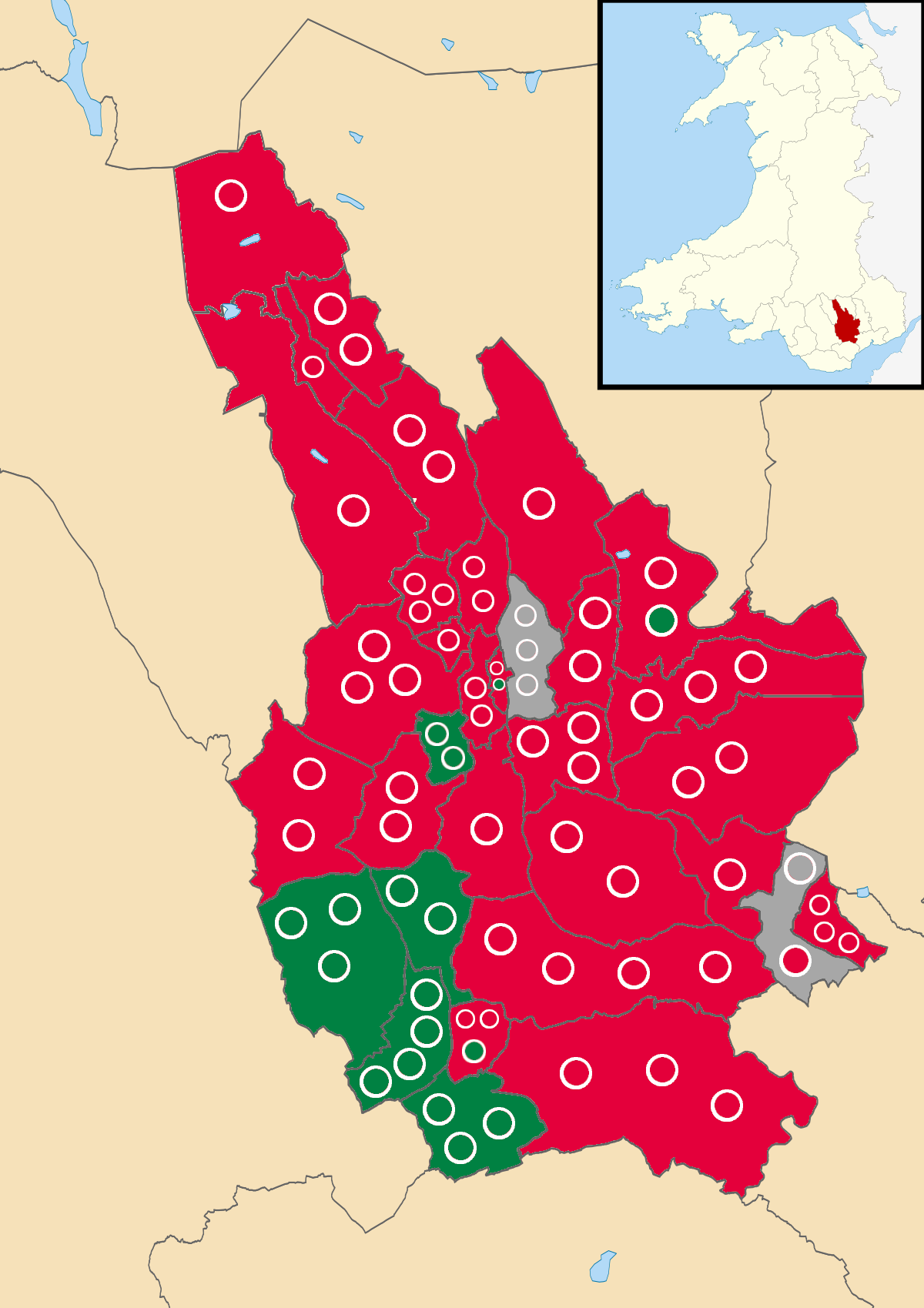
- Map showing the results of the 2017 Caerphilly County Borough Council election. Red showing Welsh Labour, Green showing Plaid Cymru & grey showing independent candidates.
Council control before election
Welsh Labour
Council control after election
Welsh Labour

The 2017 Caerphilly County Borough Council election was held on 4 May 2017 as part of the national 2017 Welsh local elections. The election was preceded by the 2012 CCBC election and was followed by the 2022 CCBC election.

== Overall results ==
Plaid Cymru had achieved tremendous growth in the 1999 Caerphilly County Borough Council election gaining a total of 38 seats, This tremendous growth had declined by the 2012 election to just 20 seats. The Independents in Caerphilly County Borough had also suffered sizable losses in the 2012 election going from 9 in 2008 election to 3 in 2012 election.

The Labour Party won 50 seats achieving a majority, Plaid Cymru obtained 18 seats and 5 seats were won by independent candidates. One seat (Twyn Carno ward) was elected unopposed.

2017 Caerphilly County Borough Council Election
Party	Seats	Gains	Losses	Net gain/loss	Seats %	Votes %	Votes	+/−
Labour	50	0	0	0	68.49	41.9	20,278	▼9.1
Plaid Cymru	18	0	2	▼2	24.65	33.9	16,423	▲4.1
Independent	5	2	0	▲2	6.84	8.8	4,237	▼5.9
Conservative	0	0	0	0	0.00	9.0	4,371	▲5.1
UKIP	0	0	0	0	0.00	3.4	1,670	New
Liberal Democrats	0	0	0	0	0.00	1.5	707	▲1.2
CPA	0	0	0	0	0.00	0.8	374	New
Green	0	0	0	0	0.00	0.5	257	New
TUSC	0	0	0	0	0.00	0.2	101	▼0.2
Total	73	0	0	0	100.0	100.0	48,418	0.0

== Ward results ==
=== Cwm Aber / Aber Valley ===
Electorate: 4612, Turnout: 30.81%
Candidate	Party	Votes	%	Notes
John Taylor	Plaid Cymru	990	26.51%	Elected
Lyndon J Binding	Plaid Cymru	984	26.35%	Elected
John Eryl Roberts	Plaid Cymru	945	25.30%	Elected
David Zenati-Parsons	Welsh Labour	307	8.22%	
Jo Rao	Welsh Labour	297	7.95%	
Ryan Graham Smith	Welsh Conservative Party	212	5.68%	

=== Aberbargod / Aberbargoed ===
Electorate: 2593, Turnout: 30.85%
Candidate	Party	Votes	%	Notes
Alan Gerald Higgs	Welsh Labour	362	24.88%	Elected
Alan George Collis	Welsh Labour	352	24.19%	Elected
Lowri Cerys Edwards	Plaid Cymru	320	21.99%	
Ted Edwards	Plaid Cymru	300	20.62%	
Keith Mills	UKIP	121	8.32%	

=== Abercarn ===
Electorate: 4059, Turnout: 34.61%
Candidate	Party	Votes	%	Notes
Andrew Whitcombe	Welsh Labour	688	28.05%	Elected
Denver Winston Redman Preece	Welsh Labour	663	27.03%	Elected
Jill Elizabeth Jones	Plaid Cymru	493	20.10%	
Tud Jones	Plaid Cymru	358	14.59%	
Margaret Elizabeth Dennehy	Welsh Liberal Democrats	251	10.23%	

=== Argoed ===
Electorate: 2018, Turnout: 36.77%
Candidate	Party	Votes	%	Notes
Walter Henry Edgar Williams	Welsh Labour	427	57.78%	Elected
John Moore	UKIP	168	22.73%	
Roger John Moore	Plaid Cymru	144	19.49%	

=== Bargod / Bargoed ===
Electorate: 4383, Turnout: 30.76%
Candidate	Party	Votes	%	Notes
Tudor Davies	Welsh Labour	692	19.59%	Elected
Dianne Price	Welsh Labour	616	17.44%	Elected
Carol Julia Andrews	Welsh Labour	582	16.47%	Elected
Kevin Philip Viney	Plaid Cymru	423	11.97%	
Gill Jones	Plaid Cymru	409	11.58%	
James Kerby	Independent	322	9.11%	
Andrew Thomas Nutt	Plaid Cymru	317	8.97%	
Belinda Gingell	Independent	172	4.87%	

=== Bedwas, Trethomas and Machen ===
Electorate: 7721, Turnout: 37.22%
Candidate	Party	Votes	%	Notes
Liz Aldworth	Welsh Labour	1,378	14.23%	Elected
Lisa Phipps	Welsh Labour	1,241	12.82%	Elected
Derek Havard	Welsh Labour	1,178	12.17%	Elected
June Gale	Welsh Labour	1,049	10.83%	Elected
John James Dew	Independent	741	7.65%	
Gareth Llewellyn	Plaid Cymru	723	7.47%	
Janet Walsh	Independent	618	6.38%	
Daniel Llewellyn	Plaid Cymru	572	5.91%	
Paul Stringer	Plaid Cymru	531	5.48%	
Philip Goodger	Welsh Conservative Party	504	5.20%	
Michael Roberts	Welsh Conservative Party	494	5.10%	
Teresa Winiarski	Plaid Cymru	397	4.10%	
Peter Clive Gaskell	Wales Green Party	257	2.65%	

=== Coed Duon / Blackwood ===
Electorate: 6178, Turnout: 38.02%
Candidate	Party	Votes	%	Notes
Kevin Etheridge	Independent	1,069	16.52%	Elected
Nigel Stuart Dix	Independent	791	12.23%	Elected
Andrew David Farina-Childs	Independent	625	9.66%	Elected
Keith Smallman	Independent	618	9.55%	
Patricia Cook	Welsh Labour	604	9.34%	
Janet Griffiths	Welsh Labour	530	8.19%	
Matthew Sessions	Welsh Labour	476	7.36%	
Allan Rees	Independent	427	6.60%	
Darren Jones	Plaid Cymru	377	5.83%	
Andrew Short	Plaid Cymru	355	5.49%	
Steven Anthony Blakeman	Plaid Cymru	320	4.95%	
Paul Taylor	UKIP	278	4.30%	

=== Cefn Fforest ===
Electorate: 2841, Turnout: 35.13%
Candidate	Party	Votes	%	Notes
Tom Williams	Welsh Labour	453	25.69%	Elected
Graham Derek Simmonds	Independent	450	25.52%	Elected
Christopher Hawker	Welsh Labour	437	24.79%	
Louise Rachael Phillips	Independent	423	23.99%	

=== Crosskeys ===
Electorate: 2436, Turnout: 35.47%
Candidate	Party	Votes	%	Notes
Julian Simmonds	Welsh Labour	450	53.44%	Elected
Christopher Phillip Norman Cook	Plaid Cymru	392	46.56%	

=== Crymlyn / Crumlin ===
Electorate: 4319, Turnout: 39.06%
Candidate	Party	Votes	%	Notes
Carl Jeffrey Thomas	Welsh Labour	701	23.62%	Elected
Mike Davies	Plaid Cymru	619	20.86%	Elected
Andrew Lewis	Welsh Labour	612	20.62%	
Alwyn Lewis Lloyd	Plaid Cymru	504	16.98%	
Philip Fowler	Independent	281	9.47%	
Dominic Walker	Independent	251	8.46%	

=== Cwm Darran / Darren Valley ===
Electorate: 1803, Turnout: 33.11%
Candidate	Party	Votes	%	Notes
David Thomas Hardacre	Welsh Labour	349	59.05%	Elected
Keiron David O'Hagan	Independent	242	40.95%	

=== Gilfach ===
Electorate: 1503, Turnout: 36.39%
Candidate	Party	Votes	%	Notes
Lindsey Harding	Welsh Labour	335	62.62%	Elected
Ken Houston	Plaid Cymru	147	27.48%	
Granville Hale	Welsh Conservative Party	53	9.91%	

=== Hengoed ===
Electorate: 3897, Turnout: 33.95%
Candidate	Party	Votes	%	Notes
Donna Cushing	Plaid Cymru	678	31.83%	Elected
Teresa Elizabeth Parry	Plaid Cymru	676	31.74%	Elected
Mark Anthony Boyland	Welsh Labour	478	22.44%	
Graham George Wills	UKIP	298	13.99%	

=== Llanbradach ===
Electorate: 3197, Turnout: 40.29%
Candidate	Party	Votes	%	Notes
Robert William Gough	Plaid Cymru	870	37.05%	Elected
Colin Peter Mann	Plaid Cymru	834	35.52%	Elected
Rhydian Dafydd Birkinshaw	Welsh Labour	324	13.80%	
Bethan Louise Thomas	Welsh Labour	320	13.63%	

=== Maesycwmmer ===
Electorate: 1652, Turnout: 38.2%
Candidate	Party	Votes	%	Notes
Vincent Alec James	Welsh Labour	327	51.99%	Elected
Catrin Sara Moss	Plaid Cymru	174	27.66%	
William Stuart Jones	Welsh Conservative Party	128	20.35%	

=== Morgan Jones ===
Electorate: 5507, Turnout: 39.88%
Candidate	Party	Votes	%	Notes
James Pritchard	Welsh Labour	1,059	17.82%	Elected
Phil Bevan	Plaid Cymru	909	15.29%	Elected
Shayne Cook	Welsh Labour	900	15.14%	Elected
Roger Bidgood	Plaid Cymru	821	13.81%	
Mike Prew	Plaid Cymru	783	13.17%	
Shelly Hodder	Welsh Labour	775	13.04%	
Peter Jones	Welsh Conservative Party	256	4.31%	
Gerry Jones	Welsh Conservative Party	245	4.12%	
Wilfred Hugh Phillips	Welsh Conservative Party	196	3.30%	

=== Moria / Moriah ===
Electorate: 3128, Turnout: 31.71%
Candidate	Party	Votes	%	Notes
John Bevan	Welsh Labour	565	36.83%	Elected
Dai Harse	Welsh Labour	538	35.07%	Elected
Nathan Thomas Flanagan	Plaid Cymru	431	28.10%	

=== Nelson ===
Electorate: 3488, Turnout: 40.48%
Candidate	Party	Votes	%	Notes
Sean Iestyn Morgan	Welsh Labour	725	28.27%	Elected
Brenda Mair Miles	Welsh Labour	560	21.83%	Elected
Malcolm Tucker	Plaid Cymru	391	15.24%	
Anne Blackman	Christian Peoples Alliance	374	14.58%	
Marls Tucker	Plaid Cymru	332	12.94%	
Kay David	Welsh Liberal Democrats	183	7.13%	

=== Tredegar Newydd / New Tredegar ===
Electorate: 3343, Turnout: 31.41%
Candidate	Party	Votes	%	Notes
Eluned Stenner	Welsh Labour	687	36.78%	Elected
Mark Anthony Evans	Welsh Labour	665	35.60%	Elected
Kev Rodgers	Independent	257	13.76%	
Rachael Joanne Dixon	Plaid Cymru	137	7.33%	
Bethany Adele Edwards	Plaid Cymru	122	6.53%	

=== Trecelyn / Newbridge ===
Electorate: 4764, Turnout: 36.9%
Candidate	Party	Votes	%	Notes
Gary Johnston	Welsh Labour	719	15.01%	Elected
Adrian Alfred Hussey	Welsh Labour	677	14.13%	Elected
Leeroy Jeremiah	Welsh Labour	655	13.67%	Elected
Kath Baker	Plaid Cymru	655	13.67%	
Wayne Lewis Morrisey	Plaid Cymru	543	11.34%	
Rhys Mills	Plaid Cymru	535	11.17%	
Jago Lewis	Welsh Conservative Party	326	6.81%	
Matthew Kidner	Welsh Liberal Democrats	273	5.70%	
Stuart Robertson	Welsh Conservative Party	206	4.30%	
Heather Robertson	Welsh Conservative Party	201	4.20%	

=== Pengam ===
Electorate: 2702, Turnout: 33.16%
Candidate	Party	Votes	%	Notes
David Vincent Poole	Welsh Labour	507	32.11%	Elected
Kevin Dawson	Welsh Labour	505	31.98%	Elected
Noel Geoffrey Turner	Plaid Cymru	350	22.17%	
Chris Paul	Plaid Cymru	217	13.74%	

=== Penmaen ===
Electorate: 4099, Turnout: 42.21%
Candidate	Party	Votes	%	Notes
Roy Saralis	Welsh Labour	903	28.00%	Elected
Ben Zaplatynski	Welsh Labour	744	23.07%	Elected
John Owen Evans	Plaid Cymru	505	15.66%	
Kevin Jones	Plaid Cymru	450	13.95%	
Richard Webb Jones	Welsh Conservative Party	324	10.05%	
Shawn Patricia Sims	Welsh Conservative Party	299	9.27%	

=== Penyrheol ===
Electorate: 8803, Turnout: 35.59%
Candidate	Party	Votes	%	Notes
Lindsay Geoffrey Whittle	Plaid Cymru	1,653	15.09%	Elected
Margaret Eiddwen Sargent	Plaid Cymru	1,340	12.23%	Elected
Jon Scriven	Plaid Cymru	1,337	12.20%	Elected
Steven John Skivens	Plaid Cymru	1,270	11.59%	Elected
Huw Rhodri Davies	Welsh Labour	910	8.31%	
Sandra Jones	Welsh Labour	854	7.79%	
Janice Anne Davies	Welsh Labour	847	7.73%	
Milena Zenati-Parsons	Welsh Labour	716	6.54%	
Gregory Elliot	Welsh Conservative Party	514	4.69%	
Cameron Muir-Jones	Welsh Conservative Party	513	4.68%	
Steven John Roberts	Welsh Conservative Party	383	3.50%	
Lawrence John Frederick Andrews	UKIP	340	3.10%	
Ian William Gorman	UKIP	279	2.55%	

=== Pontllanfraith ===
Electorate: 6241, Turnout: 36.5%
Candidate	Party	Votes	%	Notes
Michael Adams	Welsh Labour	1,107	18.27%	Elected
Colin John Gordon	Welsh Labour	1,039	17.15%	Elected
Gez Kirby	Welsh Labour	966	15.95%	Elected
Jim Criddle	Plaid Cymru	773	12.76%	
Zoe Alexandra Hammond	Plaid Cymru	589	9.72%	
Andrew Williamson	Welsh Conservative Party	544	8.98%	
Wendy Phillips	Welsh Conservative Party	533	8.80%	
Mike Jackson	Plaid Cymru	507	8.37%	

=== Pontlotyn / Pontlottyn ===
Electorate: 1429, Turnout: 37.23%
Candidate	Party	Votes	%	Notes
Gaynor Denise Oliver	Welsh Labour	239	45.01%	Elected
Mervyn Dorian Diggle	Independent	235	44.26%	
David Adam Rees	Plaid Cymru	57	10.73%	

=== Dwyrain Rhisga / Risca East ===
Electorate: 4681, Turnout: 28.09%
Candidate	Party	Votes	%	Notes
Nigel George	Welsh Labour	728	20.89%	Elected
Arianna Krystina Passmore	Welsh Labour	709	20.34%	Elected
Philippa Leonard	Welsh Labour	690	19.80%	Elected
James Jones	Welsh Conservative Party	287	8.24%	
Graham Jones	Welsh Conservative Party	279	8.01%	
James Mallindine	Welsh Conservative Party	227	6.51%	
Alexander Owen	Plaid Cymru	210	6.03%	
Gareth Macleur	Plaid Cymru	190	5.45%	
Luke Smith	Plaid Cymru	165	4.73%	

=== Gorllewin Rhisga / Risca West ===
Electorate: 3892, Turnout: 38.59%
Candidate	Party	Votes	%	Notes
Bob Owen	Independent	640	25.15%	Elected
Ross Anthony Whiting	Welsh Labour	620	24.36%	Elected
Ceri Marina Wright	Welsh Labour	525	20.63%	
Anthony Sims	Welsh Conservative Party	270	10.61%	
Brian Hancock	Plaid Cymru	265	10.41%	
Matthew Robert Farrell	Plaid Cymru	225	8.84%	

=== Catwg Sant / St. Cattwg ===
Electorate: 5583, Turnout: 32.2%
Candidate	Party	Votes	%	Notes
Wynne David	Welsh Labour	1,077	23.26%	Elected
Ann Gair	Welsh Labour	867	18.73%	Elected
Carmen Marie Bezzina	Welsh Labour	782	16.89%	Elected
Wyndham Matthews	Plaid Cymru	756	16.33%	
Robledo Jessica Alfonso	Plaid Cymru	597	12.89%	
Richard Euan Osborne	Plaid Cymru	551	11.90%	

=== Sant Iago / St. James ===
Electorate: 4247, Turnout: 38.07%
Candidate	Party	Votes	%	Notes
Christine Forehead	Welsh Labour	615	13.75%	Elected
Elaine Forehead	Welsh Labour	561	12.54%	Elected
Barbara Avril Jones	Welsh Labour	543	12.14%	Elected
Paul Michael Bradbury	Plaid Cymru	534	11.94%	
Jayne Elizabeth Garland	Plaid Cymru	517	11.56%	
John Anthony Leek	Plaid Cymru	440	9.84%	
John Evans	Welsh Conservative Party	288	6.44%	
Ian Chivers	Welsh Conservative Party	279	6.24%	
Dennis Morgan	Welsh Conservative Party	261	5.84%	
Sam Gould	UKIP	182	4.07%	
David Owers	UKIP	138	3.09%	
Andrew Shakespeare	UKIP	114	2.55%	

=== Martin Sant / St. Martins ===
Electorate: 6383, Turnout: 46.75%
Candidate	Party	Votes	%	Notes
Colin Elsbury	Plaid Cymru	1,284	15.41%	Elected
James Emmanuel Fussell	Plaid Cymru	1,250	15.00%	Elected
Steve Kent	Plaid Cymru	1,211	14.53%	Elected
Anne Olivia Broughton-Pettit	Welsh Labour	717	8.60%	
Tony Graham	Welsh Labour	714	8.57%	
Judith Elizabeth Child	Welsh Conservative Party	665	7.98%	
Robert Stanley Lea	Welsh Conservative Party	638	7.66%	
John Harry Pettit	Welsh Labour	614	7.37%	
Elizabeth Jane Evans	Welsh Conservative Party	603	7.24%	
Richard Williams	UKIP	283	3.40%	
Hazel Norris	UKIP	253	3.04%	
Megan Hannah Churchland	Trade Unionist and Socialist Coalition	101	1.21%	

=== Twyn Carno ===
Electorate: 1665
Candidate	Party	Votes	%	Notes
Carl Cuss	Welsh Labour	Unopposed	–	Elected

=== Ynysddu ===
Electorate: 2914, Turnout: 34.21%
Candidate	Party	Votes	%	Notes
Phillippa Marsden	Welsh Labour	720	39.37%	Elected
John Philip Ridgewell	Welsh Labour	638	34.88%	Elected
Lyn Ackerman	Plaid Cymru	244	13.34%	
Terry Birkett	Plaid Cymru	227	12.41%	

=== Ystrad Mynach ===
Electorate: 3979, Turnout: 39.31%
Candidate	Party	Votes	%	Notes
Martyn Paul James	Plaid Cymru	919	33.49%	Elected
Alan Patrick Angel	Plaid Cymru	885	32.25%	Elected
Kerry Jones	Welsh Labour	505	18.40%	
Alan Dowler	Welsh Labour	435	15.85%	
