= 2008 Wrexham County Borough Council election =

2008 Welsh local government election

Results of the 2008 Wrexham County Borough Council election

The 2008 Wrexham County Borough Council election took place on 1 May 2008 to elect members of Wrexham County Borough Council, the council of the county of Wrexham County Borough in Wales. This was on the same day as the other 2008 United Kingdom local elections. The previous council election took place in 2004 and the following election was held in 2012.

In the election, the council stayed under no overall control.

== Results ==
Party	Seats	Change
Independent	20	Steady
Liberal Democrats	12	▲2
Labour	11	▼8
Conservative	5	▲2
Plaid Cymru	4	▲4

== See also ==
- 2008 Welsh local elections
