= 2004 Isle of Anglesey County Council election =

2004 Welsh local government election

Results of the 2004 Isle of Anglesey County Council election

The 2004 Isle of Anglesey County Council election took place on Thursday 10 June 2004 to elect members of the Isle of Anglesey County Council in Wales. This was the same day as other United Kingdom local elections. The next full council election was on 1 May 2008.

== Election result ==
Forty county councillors were elected from forty electoral wards. Fourteen seats had no election because there were no opposing candidates.

Prior to the election the county council had been governed for 15 months by a coalition led by Plaid Cymru's Bob Parry. After the 2004 election Plaid Cymru became the official opposition with 8 councillors. There were 28 councillors not affiliated to any political party, comprising ten declared Independents and eighteen who gave no description.

Isle of Anglesey Council Election 2004
Party	Seats	Gains	Losses	Net gain/loss	Seats %	Votes %	Votes	+/−
Independent	28				70.0			
Plaid Cymru	8				20.0			
Conservative	2				5.0			
Labour	1				2.5			
Liberal Democrats	1				2.5			

== Events prior to 2008 election ==
The Plaid Cymru councillor for the Llanfihangel Ysgeifiog ward, Hughie Noel Thomas, resigned from the party group in October 2006. He was jailed for nine months on 6 November 2006 (and disqualified from being a county councillor) for falsifying Post Office records. He had been sub-postmaster in the village of Gaerwen. Independent councillor Eric Jones was elected at a by-election in 2007.
