= 2017 Bridgend County Borough Council election =

2017 Welsh local government election

- 4 May 2017

All 54 seats to Bridgend County Borough Council 28 seats needed for a majority
	First party	Second party
Party	Labour	Independent
Last election	39 seats, 47.4%	10 seats, 21.2%
Seats before	39	10
Seats won	26	13
Seat change	▼13	▲3
Popular vote	15,476	12,757
Percentage	36.5%	30.1%
Swing	▼10.9 pp	▲8.9 pp
	Third party	Fourth party
Party	Conservative	Plaid Cymru
Last election	1 seat, 12.2%	1 seat, 7.0%
Seats before	1	1
Seats won	11	3
Seat change	▲10	▲2
Popular vote	8,875	3,540
Percentage	20.9%	8.3%
Swing	▲8.7 pp	▲1.3 pp
	Fifth party
Party	Liberal Democrats
Last election	3 seats, 10.0%
Seats before	3
Seats won	1
Seat change	▼2
Popular vote	1,303
Percentage	3.1%
Swing	▼6.9 pp
- Results of the 2017 Bridgend County Borough Council election
Council control before election
Labour
Council control after election
No overall control

As part of the 2017 local elections in Wales on 4 May 2017, the 54 seats of Bridgend County Borough Council were up for election. Labour lost 13 seats, losing control of the council, while remaining the largest party.

== Election result ==
Bridgend Council Election 2017
Party	Seats	Gains	Losses	Net gain/loss	Seats %	Votes %	Votes	+/−
Labour	26	3	16	▼13	48.1	36.5	15,476	▼10.9
Independent	13	7	4	▲3	24.1	30.1	12,757	▲8.9
Conservative	11	10	0	▲10	20.4	20.9	8,875	▲8.7
Plaid Cymru	3	2	0	▲2	5.6	8.3	3,540	▲1.3
Liberal Democrats	1	0	2	▼2	1.9	3.1	1,303	▼6.9
Green	0	0	0	0	0.0	0.9	385	▼1.3
UKIP	0	0	0	0	0.0	0.1	63	New
National Front	0	0	0	0	0.0	0.0	21	▼0.1

== Ward results ==
=== Aberkenfig ===
Aberkenfig
Party	Candidate	Votes	%	±%
Plaid Cymru	James Radcliffe	277	39.5	▲20.2
Labour	Daryl Gordon	266	37.9	▲0.1
Independent	Lee Robson	158	22.5	New
Majority		11	1.6	N/A
Plaid Cymru gain from Labour		Swing		

=== Bettws ===
Bettws
Party	Candidate	Votes	%	±%
Labour	Martyn Jones	424	78.5	▲2.2
UKIP	Glenda Davies	63	11.7	New
Conservative	Christian Wallis	53	9.8	New
Majority		361	66.8	▲14.2
Labour hold		Swing		

=== Blackmill ===
Blackmill
Party	Candidate	Votes	%	±%
Labour	Hywel Williams	383	55.6	▼44.4
Independent	Andrew McKay	306	44.4	New
Majority		77	11.2	N/A
Labour hold		Swing		

=== Blaengarw ===
Blaengarw
Party	Candidate	Votes	%	±%
Independent	Sorrel Dendy	270	52.2	New
Labour	Gareth Andrews	247	47.8	▼52.2
Majority		23	4.4	N/A
Independent gain from Labour		Swing		

=== Brackla ===
Brackla (4)
Party	Candidate	Votes	%	±%
Conservative	Kay Rowlands	1,106	38.5	
Conservative	Tom Giffard	1,084		
Conservative	Aniel Pucella	1,067		
Labour	John Spanswick	1,065	37.1	
Conservative	Tyler Walsh	1,028		
Labour	Hailey Townsend	952		
Labour	Craig Jones	950		
Labour	Ciaron Jackson	928		
Independent	Shaun Bastin	432	15.0	
Independent	Nathan Goldsworthy	413		
Independent	Marcelle Humphreys	400		
Independent	Stuart Charles	364		
Independent	Jeremy Young	342		
Plaid Cymru	Nick Thomas	269	9.4	
Majority		37		
Conservative gain from Labour		Swing		
Conservative gain from Labour		Swing		
Conservative gain from Labour		Swing		
Labour hold		Swing		

=== Bryncethin ===
Bryncethin
Party	Candidate	Votes	%	±%
Labour	Gary Thomas	148	45.8	▼30.8
Independent	Mark John	115	35.6	New
Plaid Cymru	Nick Alderton	35	10.8	New
Independent	Luke Richards	25	7.7	New
Majority		33	10.2	▼43.0
Labour hold		Swing		

=== Bryncoch ===
Bryncoch
Party	Candidate	Votes	%	±%
Labour	Janice Lewis	278	50.7	▼23.5
Independent	Beth Ellis	212	38.7	New
Plaid Cymru	Sara Thomas	58	10.6	New
Majority		66	12.0	▼36.4
Labour hold		Swing		

=== Bryntirion, Laleston and Merthyr Mawr ===
Bryntirion, Laleston and Merthyr Mawr (2)
Party	Candidate	Votes	%	±%
Liberal Democrats	Cheryl Green	810	33.4	
Labour	Pamela Davies	719	29.7	
Conservative	Gordon Lewis	700	28.9	
Liberal Democrats	Ian Spiller	664		
Labour	Ian Griffiths	650		
Conservative	Wayne Warlow	642		
Green	Kathy Lewis	194	8.0	
Majority		19		
Liberal Democrats hold		Swing		
Labour hold		Swing		

=== Caerau ===
Caerau (3)
Party	Candidate	Votes	%	±%
Labour	Paul Davies	829	48.1	
Labour	Gareth Howells	753		
Labour	Phil White	753		
Independent	Phil John	575	33.4	
Independent	Stephen Smith	573		
Independent	Jen Terry	339		
Plaid Cymru	Kyle Duggan	319	18.5	
Majority		178		
Labour hold		Swing		
Labour hold		Swing		
Labour hold		Swing		

=== Cefn Cribwr ===
Cefn Cribwr
Party	Candidate	Votes	%	±%
Labour	Huw David	381	67.7	▼32.3
Plaid Cymru	Kevin Burnell	120	21.3	New
Conservative	Betty Kettley	62	11.0	New
Majority		261	46.4	N/A
Labour hold		Swing		

=== Cefn Glas ===
Cefn Glas
Party	Candidate	Votes	%	±%
Labour	Jon-Paul Blundell	212	38.5	▼23.0
Conservative	Jamie Evans	121	22.0	▲10.0
Independent	Paul Warren	115	20.9	New
Independent	Cleone Westwood	103	18.7	New
Majority		91	16.5	▼18.5
Labour hold		Swing		

=== Coity ===
Coity
Party	Candidate	Votes	%	±%
Independent	Amanda Williams	297	36.4	New
Conservative	James Davies	203	24.8	New
Independent	Ella Dodd	193	23.6	▼49.9
Labour	Ramsey Jamil	124	15.2	▲6.2
Majority		94	11.6	N/A
Independent hold		Swing		

=== Cornelly ===
Cornelly (2)
Party	Candidate	Votes	%	±%
Independent	Jeff Tildesley	907	47.4	
Labour	Richard Granville	724	37.8	
Independent	Lopper Wilson	593		
Labour	Gemma Hartnoll	535		
Independent	Dorian Morgan	454		
Conservative	Rosemary Deere	283	14.8	
Conservative	Mary Emment-Lewis	247		
Majority		131		
Independent hold		Swing		
Labour gain from Independent		Swing		

=== Coychurch Lower ===
Coychurch Lower
Party	Candidate	Votes	%	±%
Independent	Elaine Venables	325	53.6	▼17.8
Conservative	Louise Barham	199	32.8	▲18.1
Plaid Cymru	Richard Jenkins	37	6.1	New
Labour	Matthew Churchill	24	4.0	▼9.9
Liberal Democrats	Briony Davies	21	3.5	New
Majority		126	20.8	▼35.9
Independent hold		Swing		

=== Felindre ===
Felindre
Party	Candidate	Votes	%	±%
Labour	Bridie Sedgebeer	408	48.9	▼15.9
Conservative	John Butcher	338	40.5	New
Independent	Simon Curwood	88	10.6	New
Majority		70	8.4	▼21.2
Labour hold		Swing		

=== Hendre ===
Hendre (2)
Party	Candidate	Votes	%	±%
Conservative	Julia Williams	572	45.3	
Labour	John McCarthy	516	40.9	
Labour	Richard Williams	514		
Conservative	Jamie Wallis	483		
Plaid Cymru	Viv Jenkins	174	13.8	
Majority		2		
Conservative gain from Labour		Swing		
Labour hold		Swing		

=== Litchard ===
Litchard
Party	Candidate	Votes	%	±%
Conservative	Sadie Vidal	406	42.1	▲1.9
Labour	Cherie Jones	375	38.9	▼20.9
Independent	Alan Wathan	184	19.1	New
Majority		31	3.2	N/A
Conservative gain from Labour		Swing		

=== Llangeinor ===
Llangeinor
Party	Candidate	Votes	%	±%
Independent	Roz Stirman	162	54.4	New
Labour	Marlene Thomas	136	45.6	▼54.4
Majority		26	8.8	N/A
Independent gain from Labour		Swing		

=== Llangewydd and Brynhyfryd ===
Llangewydd and Brynhyfryd
Party	Candidate	Votes	%	±%
Labour	Charles Smith	311	44.1	▼22.2
Liberal Democrats	Tony Berrow	134	19.0	▼7.0
Conservative	Claire Lewis	124	17.6	New
Independent	Eric Hughes	115	16.3	New
National Front	Adam Lloyd	21	3.0	▼4.7
Majority		177	25.1	▼15.2
Labour hold		Swing		

=== Llangynwyd ===
Llangynwyd
Party	Candidate	Votes	%	±%
Plaid Cymru	Malcolm James	593	58.3	▲4.2
Labour	Elaine Guscott	345	33.9	▼12.0
Green	Tom Muller	79	7.8	New
Majority		248	24.4	▲16.2
Plaid Cymru hold		Swing		

=== Maesteg East ===
Maesteg East (2)
Party	Candidate	Votes	%	±%
Independent	Keith Edwards	858	51.8	
Independent	Tom Beedle	684		
Labour	Mal Reeves	544	32.8	
Labour	Rose Martin	473		
Plaid Cymru	Illtyd ap Dafydd	255	15.4	
Majority		174		
Independent gain from Labour		Swing		
Independent gain from Labour		Swing		

=== Maesteg West ===
Maesteg West (2)
Party	Candidate	Votes	%	±%
Independent	Ross Thomas	1,167	55.0	
Labour	Richard Collins	742	35.0	
Labour	Ceri Reeves	497		
Independent	Dave Evans	472		
Plaid Cymru	Dai Berry	214	10.1	
Independent	Robert Vincent	202		
Plaid Cymru	Paula Thomas	143		
Independent	Ian Jones	140		
Majority		245		
Independent gain from Labour		Swing		
Labour hold		Swing		

=== Morfa ===
Morfa (2)
Party	Candidate	Votes	%	±%
Labour	Stuart Baldwin	466	40.7	
Labour	Nicole Burnett	458		
Independent	Pete Foley	406	35.5	
Independent	Steven Bletsoe	384		
Independent	Martin Williams	215		
Conservative	Tom Overfield	197	17.2	
Conservative	Judith Butcher	184		
Green	John Evans	75	6.6	
Majority		52		
Labour hold		Swing		
Labour gain from Independent		Swing		

=== Nant-y-moel ===
Nant-y-moel
Party	Candidate	Votes	%	±%
Independent	David Owen	506	61.6	▲7.4
Labour	Sandy Blackburn	316	38.4	▼7.4
Majority		190	23.2	▲14.8
Independent hold		Swing		

=== Newcastle ===
Newcastle (2)
Party	Candidate	Votes	%	±%
Conservative	Carolyn Webster	610	34.3	
Labour	David White	590	33.1	
Independent	Tim Wood	581	32.6	
Labour	Neelo Farr	553		
Conservative	Craig Lawton	424		
Independent	David Unwin	419		
Majority		9		
Conservative gain from Labour		Swing		
Labour hold		Swing		

=== Newton ===
Newton
Party	Candidate	Votes	%	±%
Conservative	Kenneth Watts	597	40.8	▼13.3
Independent	Graham Walter	485	33.2	New
Liberal Democrats	Jonathan Pratt	224	15.3	New
Labour	Will Hingley	156	10.7	▼20.0
Majority		112	7.6	▼15.8
Conservative hold		Swing		

=== Nottage ===
Nottage
Party	Candidate	Votes	%	±%
Independent	Norah Clarke	843	62.7	New
Conservative	Robert Lee	316	23.5	▼1.1
Labour	Paul Winstanley	185	13.8	▼15.2
Majority		527	39.2	N/A
Independent gain from Liberal Democrats		Swing		

=== Ogmore Vale ===
Ogmore Vale
Party	Candidate	Votes	%	±%
Labour	Dhanisha Patel	496	53.4	▲8.4
Independent	Louvain Lake	260	28.0	New
Plaid Cymru	Richard Shakeshaft	173	18.6	New
Majority		236	25.4	N/A
Labour gain from Independent		Swing		

=== Oldcastle ===
Oldcastle (2)
Party	Candidate	Votes	%	±%
Conservative	Lyn Walters	587	37.3	
Conservative	Matthew Voisey	560		
Independent	Edith Hughes	516	32.8	
Labour	Angela Morelli	470	29.9	
Labour	Gary Sassoon-Hales	394		
Independent	Freya Bletsoe	376		
Independent	Rebecca Porter	297		
Majority		44		
Conservative gain from Labour		Swing		
Conservative gain from Labour		Swing		

=== Pen-y-fai ===
Pen-y-fai
Party	Candidate	Votes	%	±%
Conservative	Altaf Hussain	367	42.8	▲11.4
Labour	Heidi Bennett	320	37.3	▼0.2
Independent	Meryl Wilkins	95	11.1	▼20.0
Plaid Cymru	Sarah Parry	76	8.9	New
Majority		47	5.5	N/A
Conservative gain from Labour		Swing		

=== Pendre ===
Pendre
Party	Candidate	Votes	%	±%
Labour	Richard Young	260	45.7	▼6.7
Conservative	Kevin Edger	115	20.2	New
Liberal Democrats	Anita Davie	114	20.0	▼17.3
Independent	Dean Barrington	80	14.1	New
Majority		145	25.5	▲10.4
Labour hold		Swing		

=== Penprysg ===
Penprysg
Party	Candidate	Votes	%	±%
Conservative	Alex Williams	612	57.2	New
Labour	Alex Owen	372	34.8	▼27.6
Plaid Cymru	Leanne Lewis	85	8.0	New
Majority		240	22.4	N/A
Conservative gain from Labour		Swing		

=== Pontycymmer ===
Pontycymmer
Party	Candidate	Votes	%	±%
Labour	Roderick Shaw	461	74.8	▼25.2
Independent	Claire Walters	155	25.2	New
Majority		306	49.6	N/A
Labour hold		Swing		

=== Porthcawl East Central ===
Porthcawl East Central
Party	Candidate	Votes	%	±%
Independent	Brian Jones	512	54.1	▼2.6
Labour	Raynor Lewis	247	26.1	▼8.1
Conservative	Bobby Lewis	187	19.8	New
Majority		265	28.0	▲5.5
Independent hold		Swing		

=== Porthcawl West Central ===
Porthcawl West Central
Party	Candidate	Votes	%	±%
Independent	Sean Aspey	631	51.8	▼7.9
Conservative	Alun Thomas	340	27.9	▲8.0
Labour	Alana Davies	247	20.3	Steady
Majority		291	23.9	▼15.5
Independent hold		Swing		

=== Pyle ===
Pyle (3)
Party	Candidate	Votes	%	±%
Labour	Mike Kearn	1,006	54.1	
Labour	Jane Gebbie	910		
Labour	Stephen Smith	801		
Conservative	Phil Barham	457	24.6	
Plaid Cymru	Rhys Watkins	396	21.3	
Conservative	David Deere	320		
Conservative	Ann Lee	310		
Majority		344		
Labour hold		Swing		
Labour hold		Swing		
Labour hold		Swing		

=== Rest Bay ===
Rest Bay
Party	Candidate	Votes	%	±%
Independent	Mike Clarke	665	64.8	New
Conservative	Caroline Vaughan	253	24.6	▼20.2
Labour	John Bunker	72	7.0	New
Green	Alex Harris	37	3.6	New
Majority		412	40.2	N/A
Independent gain from Liberal Democrats		Swing		

=== Sarn ===
Sarn
Party	Candidate	Votes	%	±%
Labour	Watkin Lewis	325	55.6	▼28.2
Independent	Sally Hyde	127	21.7	New
Conservative	Irina Scelkunova	70	12.0	New
Plaid Cymru	Claire Thomas	63	10.8	New
Majority		198	33.9	▼33.7
Labour hold		Swing		

=== Ynysawdre ===
Ynysawdre
Party	Candidate	Votes	%	±%
Plaid Cymru	Tim Thomas	396	40.8	▲6.3
Labour	Fadhel Abedalkarim	286	29.5	▼29.5
Independent	Christopher Lavis	161	16.6	New
Independent	Haydn Morgan	127	13.1	New
Majority		110	11.3	N/A
Plaid Cymru gain from Labour		Swing		
