= Risca West =

Community in Caerphilly, Wales

Coordinates: 51°36′37″N 3°06′17″W

- Community

- Location within Caerphilly
- Area: 5.14 km^{2} (1.98 sq mi)
- Population: 5,229 (2011 census)
  - Density: 1,017/km^{2} (2,630/sq mi)
- Community: Risca West
- Principal area: Caerphilly
- Country: Wales
- Sovereign state: United Kingdom
- Police: Gwent
- Fire: South Wales
- Ambulance: Welsh
- Website: Risca Town Council

Risca West is a community and electoral ward in Caerphilly County Borough. It is one of two communities to cover the town of Risca. In 2011 the community and ward had a population of 5229. The community borders Bedwas, Trethomas and Machen, Crosskeys, Graig, Henllys, Risca East and Rogerstone.

The community of Risca West was formed in April 2013, alongside Risca East, and the council was soon renamed to Risca Town Council. In 2023 a change was proposed to merge the community with the neighbouring Risca East to form a new Risca Community Council.

As of November 2021, Risca Town Council charged the highest council tax rate in Caerphilly County Borough.
