= 2022 Caerphilly County Borough Council election =

2022 Welsh local government election

- 5 May 2022

All 69 seats for Caerphilly County Borough Council 35 seats needed for a majority
	First party	Second party	Third party
	Labour	Plaid Cymru	Independent
Leader	Philippa Marsden	Colin Mann	N/A
Party	Labour	Plaid Cymru	Independent
Leader's seat	Ynysddu (lost)	Llanbradach	N/A
Last election	50	18	5
Seats after	45	18	6
Seat change	▼5	0	▲1
Popular vote	41,013	34,235	14,656
Percentage	43.38%	36.21%	15.5%

The 2022 Caerphilly County Borough Council election was held on 5 May 2022 to elect 69 members to the Caerphilly County Borough Council in Wales, as a part of both the 2022 Welsh local elections, and the 2022 United Kingdom local elections. The electoral ward divisions had been altered, and the number of councillors elected had dropped from 73 to 69. Labour held their majority of the council.

== Background ==
=== Previous election ===
Results of the 2017 Caerphilly council election
Party	Seats	Change
Labour	50	0
Plaid Cymru	18	–2
Independent	5	–2

=== Process ===
The Local Government and Elections Wales Act 2021 made changes to the election system enabling 16 year olds to vote. Caerphilly County Borough launched a pilot scheme to increase voter participation, this would include being able to vote on the weekend before 5 May. A boundary review reduced the number of seats in the council from 73 to 69. Boundaries and member numbers were changed in all but six wards, Crosskeys, Hengoed, Llanbradach, St Cattwg, Ynysddu and Ystrad Mynach.

== Election result summary ==
2022 Caerphilly County Borough Council election
Party	Seats	Gains	Losses	Net gain/loss	Seats %	Votes %	Votes	+/−
Labour	45				65.22	43.38	41,013	
Plaid Cymru	18				26.09	36.21	34,235	
Independent	6				8.70	15.50	14,656	
Conservative	0				0.00	3.38	3,195	
Liberal Democrats	0				0.00	0.96	904	
Green	0				0.00	0.23	214	
SDP	0				0.00	0.22	210	
TUSC	0				0.00	0.12	111	

== Ward results ==
The results for each ward were:

=== Cwm Aber/ Aber Valley ward ===
Cwm Aber
Party	Candidate	Votes	%	±%
Plaid Cymru	John Eryl Roberts	903	72.9	
Plaid Cymru	John Taylor	901	72.8	
Plaid Cymru	Charlotte Bishop	773	62.4	
Labour	Joy Morgan	440	35.5	
Turnout		1,238	26.43	
Plaid Cymru win (new seat)				
Plaid Cymru win (new seat)				
Plaid Cymru win (new seat)				

=== Aberbargoed & Bargoed ===
Aberbargoed & Bargoed
Party	Candidate	Votes	%	±%
Labour	Tudor Davies	904	46.9	
Labour	Dianne Price	810	42.0	
Labour	Dawn Ingram-Jones	803	41.6	
Plaid Cymru	Chris Bissex-Foster	743	38.5	
Plaid Cymru	Paul Ted Edwards	729	37.8	
Plaid Cymru	Ken Houston	676	35.1	
Independent	Rob Puddefoot	259	13.4	
Independent	Belinda Gingell	219	11.4	
Turnout		1,928	27.09	
Labour win (new seat)				
Labour win (new seat)				
Labour win (new seat)				

=== Abercarn ===
Abercarn
Party	Candidate	Votes	%	±%
Labour	Andy Whitcombe	743	61.0	
Labour	Denver Preece	653	53.6	
Plaid Cymru	Jill Jones	484	39.7	
Plaid Cymru	Illtud Jones	408	33.5	
Turnout		1,219	29.90	
Labour win (new seat)				
Labour win (new seat)				

=== Argoed ===
Argoed
Party	Candidate	Votes	%	±%
Labour	Walter Henry Edgar Williams	356	61.3	
Independent	Iestyn James	121	20.8	
Plaid Cymru	Shane Parsons	104	17.9	
Turnout		581	28.75	
Labour win (new seat)				

=== Bedwas & Trethomas ===
Bedwas & Trethomas
Party	Candidate	Votes	%	±%
Labour	Lisa Phipps	1,197	69.9	
Labour	Liz Aldworth	1,023	59.8	
Labour	Jill Winslade	913	53.3	
Plaid Cymru	Chris Bissex-Foster	469	27.4	
Plaid Cymru	Paul Ted Edwards	434	25.4	
Conservative	Kieran Lloyd	273	15.9	
TUSC	Peter Thomas	111	6.5	
Turnout		1,712	33.78	
Labour win (new seat)				
Labour win (new seat)				
Labour win (new seat)				

=== Blackwood ===
Blackwood
Party	Candidate	Votes	%	±%
Independent	Kevin Etheridge	1,877	76.2	
Independent	Andrew Farina-Childs	1,695	68.9	
Independent	Nigel Stuart Dix	1,634	66.4	
Labour	Dean Jones	738	30.0	
Labour	Hero Marsden	482	19.6	
Turnout		2,462	37.88	
Independent win (new seat)				
Independent win (new seat)				

=== Cefn Fforest & Pengam ===
Cefn Fforest & Pengam
Party	Candidate	Votes	%	±%
Labour	Shane Williams	929	54.1	
Labour	Teresa Heron	886	51.6	
Labour	Marina Chacon-Dawson	856	49.9	
Independent	Louise Phillips	582	33.9	
Independent	Gerwyn James	554	32.3	
Independent	George Edwards	553	32.2	
Conservative	Johnny Parker	238	13.9	
Turnout		1,716	30.38	
Labour win (new seat)				
Labour win (new seat)				
Labour win (new seat)				

=== Crosskeys ===
Crosskeys
Party	Candidate	Votes	%	±%
Labour	Julian Simmonds	415	51.5	
Plaid Cymru	Chris Cook	334	41.4	
Liberal Democrats	Tony Potts	57	7.1	
Turnout		806	32.2	
Labour hold		Swing		

=== Crumlin ===
Crumlin
Party	Candidate	Votes	%	±%
Labour	Carl Thomas	929	64.6	
Labour	Kristian Woodland	652	45.3	
Plaid Cymru	Mike Davies	562	39.1	
Plaid Cymru	Claire Morgan	470	32.7	
Liberal Democrats	Mary Elizabeth Lloyd	104	7.2	
Liberal Democrats	Steve Lloyd	83	5.8	
Turnout		1,438	33.09	
Labour win (new seat)				
Labour win (new seat)				

=== Darren Valley ===
Darren Valley
Party	Candidate	Votes	%	±%
Labour	Robert Edward Chapman	512	89.5	
Independent	Gavin Hughes	60	10.5	
Turnout		572	30.19	
Labour win (new seat)				

=== Gilfach ===
Gilfach
Party	Candidate	Votes	%	±%
Labour	Carol Julia Andrews	343	72.7	
Plaid Cymru	Elaine Meredith	129	27.3	
Turnout		472	31.07	
Labour win (new seat)				

=== Hengoed ===
Hengoed
Party	Candidate	Votes	%	±%
Plaid Cymru	Donna Cushing	608	53.2	
Plaid Cymru	Teresa Parry	576	50.4	
Labour	Tracey Rowlands	502	43.9	
Labour	Rhiannon Stone	494	43.2	
Turnout		1,143	27.89	
Plaid Cymru hold		Swing		
Plaid Cymru hold		Swing		

=== Llanbradach ===
Llanbradach
Party	Candidate	Votes	%	±%
Plaid Cymru	Colin Mann	775	66.3	
Plaid Cymru	Gary Enright	643	55.0	
Labour	Adam Birkinshaw-Bird	394	33.7	
Labour	Rhydian Dafydd Birkinshaw-Bird	365	31.2	
Turnout		1,169	36.59	
Plaid Cymru hold		Swing		
Plaid Cymru hold		Swing		

=== Machen and Rudry ===
Machen and Rudry
Party	Candidate	Votes	%	±%
Labour	Amanda McConnell	714	55.2	
Labour	Chris Morgan	670	51.8	
Liberal Democrats	Steve Aicheler	417	32.3	
Conservative	Ellis Michael Smith	283	21.9	
Liberal Democrats	Gareth Colin Bryant	243	18.8	
Turnout		1,293	34.15	
Labour win (new seat)				
Labour win (new seat)				

=== Maesycwmmer ===
Maesycwmmer
Party	Candidate	Votes	%	±%
Labour Co-op	Jo Rao	337	59.9	
Plaid Cymru	Garin Rhys Davies	226	40.1	
Turnout		563	29.58	
Labour Co-op win (new seat)				

=== Morgan Jones ===
Morgan Jones
Party	Candidate	Votes	%	±%
Labour	Jamie Pritchard	1,092	50.1	
Labour	Shayne Cook	1,002	46.0	
Labour	Anne Broughton-Pettit	916	42.1	
Plaid Cymru	Mike Prew	816	37.5	
Plaid Cymru	John Martin Downes	636	29.2	
Plaid Cymru	Mark Andrew Robotham	625	28.7	
Conservative	John Child	242	11.1	
Conservative	Judith Elizabeth Child	229	10.5	
Green	Alexis Celnik	214	9.8	
Turnout		2,178	37.91	
Labour win (new seat)				
Labour win (new seat)				
Labour win (new seat)				

=== Moriah and Pontlottyn ===
Moriah and Pontlottyn
Party	Candidate	Votes	%	±%
Labour	Mansel Powell	907	71.4	
Labour	David Harse	781	61.5	
Plaid Cymru	Rhodri Morgan	305	24.0	
Plaid Cymru	Alyn Davies	259	20.4	
Turnout		1,270	31.74	
Labour win (new seat)				
Labour win (new seat)				

=== Nelson ===
Nelson
Party	Candidate	Votes	%	±%
Labour	Sean Morgan	627	43.9	
Labour	Brenda Miles	518	36.3	
Independent	Rod Powell	383	26.8	
Independent	Brett Jenkins	365	25.6	
Plaid Cymru	Eifion Dafydd	296	20.7	
Plaid Cymru	Aled John	286	20.0	
Conservative	Naomi Ruth Miles	82	5.7	
Turnout		1,427	39.55	
Labour win (new seat)				
Labour win (new seat)				

=== New Tredegar ===
New Tredegar
Party	Candidate	Votes	%	±%
Labour	Eluned Stenner	675	71.5	
Labour	Mark Anthony Evans	617	65.4	
Independent	Tracey Gifford	299	31.7	
Independent	Faebian Vann	154	16.3	
Turnout		944	28.68	
Labour win (new seat)				
Labour win (new seat)				

=== Newbridge ===
Newbridge
Party	Candidate	Votes	%	±%
Labour	Adrian Hussey	745	49.2	
Labour	Gary Johnston	733	48.4	
Labour	Leeroy Jeremiah	729	48.2	
Plaid Cymru	Lyn Ackerman	687	45.4	
Plaid Cymru	Rhys Mills	468	30.9	
Plaid Cymru	Wayne Morrisey	415	27.4	
Conservative	Christine Edwards	193	12.7	
Conservative	Kyle Butcher	182	12.0	
Turnout		1,514	31.16	
Labour win (new seat)				
Labour win (new seat)				
Labour win (new seat)				

=== Penmaen ===
Penmaen
Party	Candidate	Votes	%	±%
Labour	Roy Saralis	831	60.3	
Labour	Jim Sadler	775	56.3	
Plaid Cymru	Andrew Short	458	33.3	
Plaid Cymru	Kevin Jones	454	33.0	
Turnout		1,377	31.48	
Labour win (new seat)				
Labour win (new seat)				

=== Penyrheol ===
Penyrheol
Party	Candidate	Votes	%	±%
Plaid Cymru	Lindsay Geoffrey Whittle	1,975	66.0	
Plaid Cymru	Jon Scriven	1,660	55.5	
Plaid Cymru	Steven John Skivens	1,626	54.3	
Plaid Cymru	Greg Ead	1,458	48.7	
Labour	Phil Rosser	1,159	38.7	
Conservative	Brandon Philip Gorman	532	17.8	
Turnout		2,993	31.48	
Plaid Cymru win (new seat)				
Plaid Cymru win (new seat)				
Plaid Cymru win (new seat)				
Plaid Cymru win (new seat)				

=== Pontllanfraith ===
Pontllanfraith
Party	Candidate	Votes	%	±%
Labour	Mike Adams	1,045	52.9	
Labour	Pat Cook	926	46.8	
Labour	Colin John Gordon	815	41.2	
Independent	Laura Jane Richards	782	39.6	
Independent	Roy Williams	565	28.6	
Independent	James Wells	515	26.0	
Conservative	Cathrine Clark	373	18.9	
SDP	Jacob Pearce	210	10.6	
Turnout		1,977	30.99	
Labour win (new seat)				
Labour win (new seat)				
Labour win (new seat)				

=== Risca East ===
Risca East
Party	Candidate	Votes	%	±%
Labour	Nigel George	698	59.3	
Labour	Arianna Leonard	631	53.6	
Labour	Philippa Leonard	626	53.1	
Plaid Cymru	Brandon Ham	404	34.3	
Plaid Cymru	Alan Thomas	401	34.0	
Plaid Cymru	Matthew Farrel	301	25.6	
Turnout		1,178	25.89	
Labour win (new seat)				
Labour win (new seat)				
Labour win (new seat)				

=== Risca West ===
Risca West
Party	Candidate	Votes	%	±%
Independent	Bob Owen	983	71.9	
Labour	Ceri Wright	629	46.0	
Independent	Rob Derraven	585	42.8	
Turnout		1,367	34.28	
Independent win (new seat)				
Labour win (new seat)				

=== St. Cattwg ===
St. Cattwg
Party	Candidate	Votes	%	±%
Plaid Cymru	Haydn Pritchard	902	49.6	
Labour	Ann Gair	848	46.6	
Plaid Cymru	Judith Ann Pritchard	843	46.3	
Labour	Carmen Marie Bezzina	822	45.2	
Labour	John Tully Toner	784	43.1	
Plaid Cymru	Catrin Sara Moss	752	41.3	
Turnout		1,820	32.81	
Plaid Cymru gain from Labour		Swing		
Labour hold		Swing		
Plaid Cymru gain from Labour		Swing		

=== St. Martins ===
St. Martins
Party	Candidate	Votes	%	±%
Plaid Cymru	Colin Elsbury	1,581	57.1	
Plaid Cymru	James Emanuel Fussel	1,522	54.9	
Plaid Cymru	Stephen Kent	1,421	51.3	
Labour	Cath Lewis	1,165	42.1	
Conservative	Robert Stanley Lea	568	20.5	
Turnout		2,770	41.33	
Plaid Cymru win (new seat)				
Plaid Cymru win (new seat)				
Plaid Cymru win (new seat)				

=== Twyn Carno ===
Twyn Carno
Party	Candidate	Votes	%	±%
Labour	Carl Cuss	652	80.4	
Independent	Peter Bailie	159	19.6	
Turnout		811	35.75	
Labour win (new seat)				

=== Van ===
Van
Party	Candidate	Votes	%	±%
Labour	Christine Forehead	536	53.4	
Labour	Elaine Forehead	490	48.8	
Plaid Cymru	Lynne Hughes	443	44.1	
Plaid Cymru	Jeff Grenfell	408	40.6	
Turnout		1,004	30.27	
Labour win (new seat)				
Labour win (new seat)				

=== Ynysddu ===
Ynysddu
Party	Candidate	Votes	%	±%
Independent	Jan Jones	1,162	83.9	
Independent	Janine Reed	1,150	83.0	
Labour	Philippa Marsden	213	15.4	
Labour	Phoebe Marsden	182	13.1	
Turnout		1,385	45.78	
Independent gain from Labour		Swing		
Independent gain from Labour		Swing		

=== Ystrad Mynach ===
Ystrad Mynach
Party	Candidate	Votes	%	±%
Plaid Cymru	Martyn James	972	63.9	
Plaid Cymru	Alan Angel	914	60.1	
Labour	Mathew Cook	640	42.1	
Turnout		1,521	37.32	
Plaid Cymru win (new seat)				
Plaid Cymru win (new seat)				

== By-elections between 2022 and 2027 ==
=== Penmaen (2023) ===
A by-election took place on 31 August 2023 following the death of Labour councillor, Jim Sadler. The by-election was held by Labour's Elizabeth Davies.

Penmaen by-election: 31 August 2023
Party	Candidate	Votes	%	±%
Labour	Elizabeth Davies	457	35.1	
Plaid Cymru	Andrew Short	346	26.6	
Independent	George Edwards-Etheridge	247	19.1	
Liberal Democrats	Jonathan David Errington	125	9.6	
Conservative	Imogen Martin	120	9.2	
Gwlad	Clayton Francis Jones	8	0.6	
Majority				
Turnout		1,303	29.1	
Labour hold		Swing		

=== Penyrheol (2025) ===
A by-election took place on 12 December 2025 due the resignation of Plaid Cymru councillor Lindsay Whittle, following his victory in the 2025 Caerphilly by-election. The seat was held by Plaid Cymru's candidate, Aneurin Minton.

Penyrheol by-election: 12 December 2025
Party	Candidate	Votes	%	±%
Plaid Cymru	Aneurin Minton	956	60.1	−19.8
Reform	James Bevan	422	26.5	N/A
Labour	Keiran Russell	114	7.2	−6.4
Conservative	Brandon Philip Gorman	66	4.2	−2.1
Liberal Democrats	Mary Elizabeth Lloyd	32	2.0	N/A
Majority		534	33.6	−32.5
Turnout		1,590	16.16	−15.32
Plaid Cymru hold		Swing		

=== Van (2026) ===
A by-election took place on 19 February 2026 following the death of Labour councillor, Christine Forehead on 21 November 2025. The seat was won by Plaid Cymru's candidate, Jeff Grenfell.

Van by-election: 19 February 2026
Party	Candidate	Votes	%	±%
Plaid Cymru	Jeff Grenfell	374	43.3	▼0.8
Reform	Russel Larke	246	28.5	N/A
Labour	Matthew Ferris	231	26.8	▼26.6
Liberal Democrats	Tony Potts	12	1.4	N/A
Majority		128	14.8	+5.4
Turnout		863	25.87	▼4.4
Plaid Cymru gain from Labour		Swing		

=== Hengoed (2026) ===
Hengoed by-election: 6 August 2026
Party	Candidate	Votes	%	±%
Plaid Cymru	Anthony Cook	509	49.9	−4.9
Reform	Kimberley Heath	371	36.4	N/A
Labour	Dan Kelly	103	10.1	−35.1
Conservative	David Emmins	21	2.1	N/A
Liberal Democrats	David Scullin	16	1.6	N/A
Majority		138	13.5	N/A
Turnout		1020	24.9	−3.0
Plaid Cymru hold		Swing		

=== Risca East (2026) ===
Risca East by-election: 19 November 2026
Party	Candidate	Votes	%	±%
Reform	Darren Crandon	438	42.5	N/A
Labour	Marcus Leonard	285	27.7	−35.7
Plaid Cymru	Brandon Ham	139	13.5	−23.2
Independent	Peter Heathcote	91	8.8	N/A
Conservative	Ceithin Dennes	46	4.5	N/A
Green	Tracy Barrington	31	3.0	N/A
Majority		153	14.9	N/A
Turnout		1030	22.6	−3.3
Reform gain from Labour		Swing		
