= 2008 Caerphilly County Borough Council election =

2008 Welsh local government election

- 1 May 2008

All 73 seats to Caerphilly County Borough Council 37 seats needed for a majority
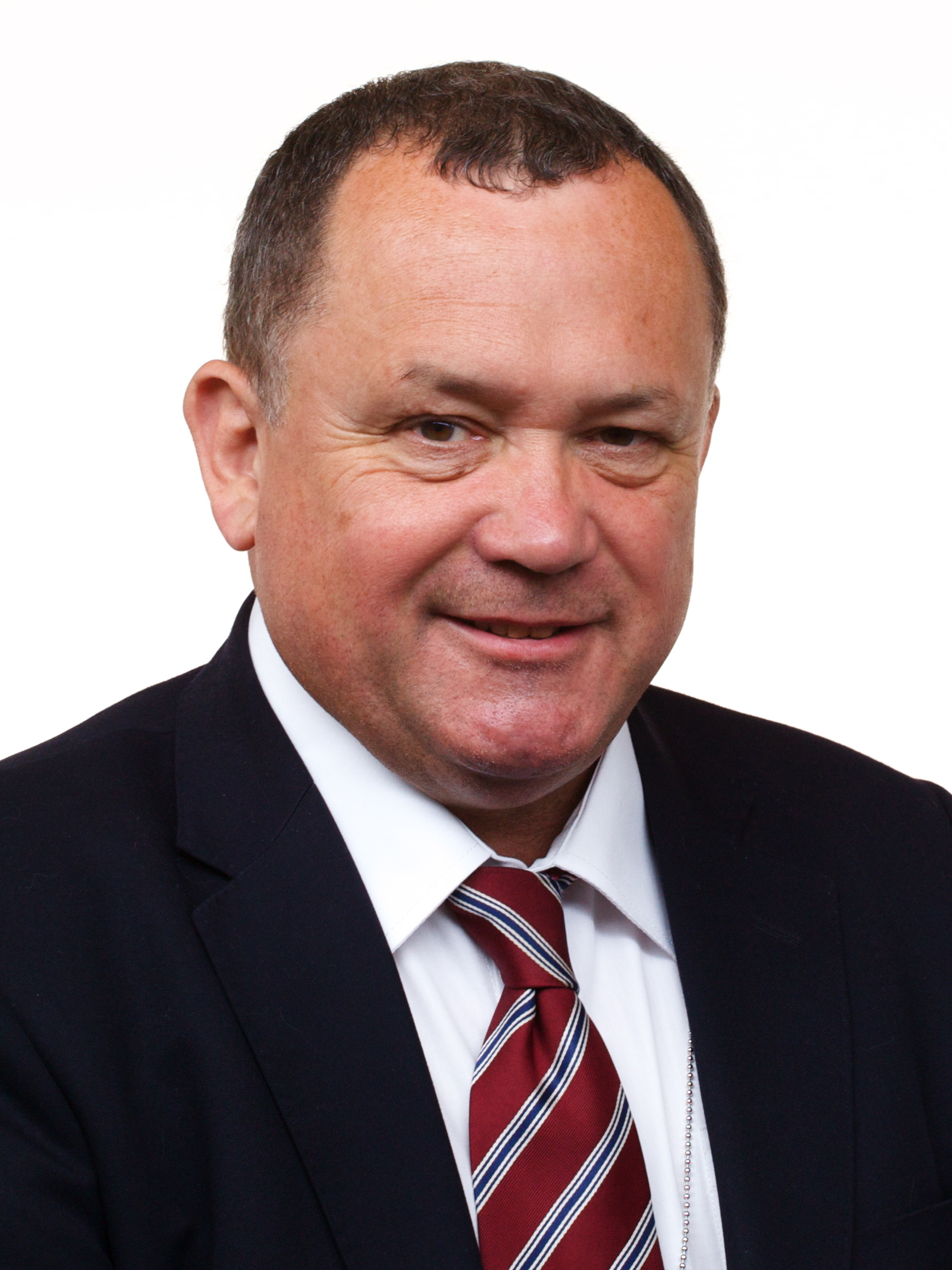
	First party	Second party	Third party
		Lab	Ind
Leader	Lindsay Whittle	Harry Andrews	N/A
Party	Plaid Cymru	Labour	Independent
Leader's seat	Penyrheol	Gilfach	N/A
Seats before	26	41	6
Seats won	32	32	9
Seat change	▲6	▼9	▲3
Popular vote	19,607	20,181	9,539
Percentage	36.3%	37.3%	17.6%

The 2008 Caerphilly County Borough Council election took place on 1 May 2008 to elect 73 members to Caerphilly County Borough Council in Wales, as a part of both the 2008 Welsh local elections, and the 2008 United Kingdom local elections. Labour lost control of the council, and was replaced by a Plaid Cymru-led minority administration.

== Results ==
2008 Caerphilly County Borough Council election
Party	Seats	Gains	Losses	Net gain/loss	Seats %	Votes %	Votes	+/−
Plaid Cymru	32			+6	44	36.3	20,181	
Labour	32			-9	44	37.3	20,181	
Independent	9			+9	12	17.6	9,539	
Conservative	0			0	0	6.3	3,419	
Liberal Democrats	0			0	0.0	2.2	1,214	
Communist	0			0	0	0.2	123	
