= 2008 Conwy County Borough Council election =

2008 Welsh local election

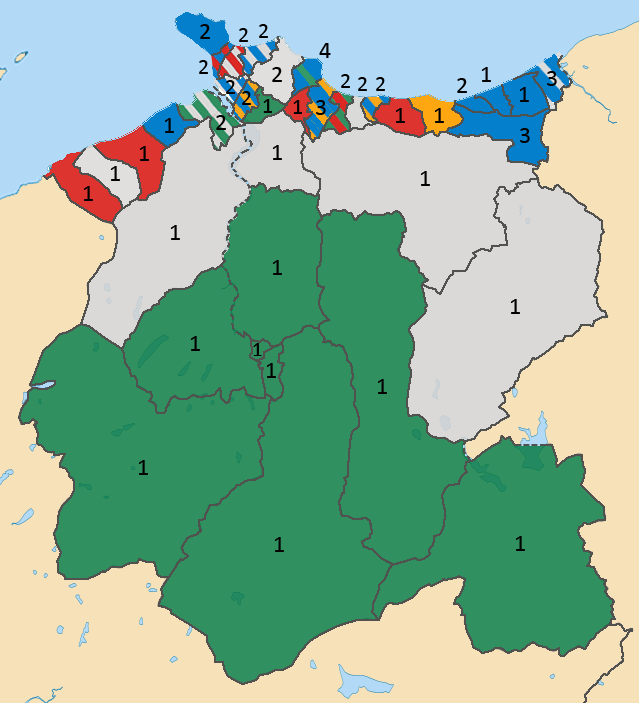
2008 election results map, showing numbers of councillors per ward and their party affiliations

The 2008 Conwy Borough Council election took place on 1 May 2008 to elect members of Conwy County Borough Council in Wales. It was on the same day as other 2008 United Kingdom local elections. The previous elections took place on 10 June 2004 and the following election took place on 3 May 2012.

Fifty nine county councillors were elected from the county's thirty eight electoral wards. The biggest gains were by the Conservative Party with eight additional seats, while the Labour Party and Independent group lost out. There were several very close results, with the Conservatives winning in Capelulo by 26 votes, the sitting veteran Labour councillor in Llandudno's Tudno losing by 27 votes and the Independent councillor in Llansannan winning by only four votes. Similarly to the previous Conwy elections in 1995, 1999 and 2004, no party or group ended in overall majority control.

== Overview ==
Conwy County Borough Council election result 2017
| Party | Seats | Gains | Losses | Net gain/loss | Seats % | Votes % | Votes | +/− |
|---|---|---|---|---|---|---|---|---|
| Conservative | 22 | | | +8 | 37.3 | 37.0 | | |
| Independent | 14 | | | | 23.7 | 26.0 | | |
| Plaid Cymru | 12 | | | | 20.3 | 12.0 | | |
| Labour | 6 | | | | 10.2 | 10.0 | | |
| Liberal Democrats | 4 | | | | 6.8 | 11.0 | | |
| Labour Co-op | 1 | | | | 1.7 | <1.0 | | |
| BNP | 0 | | | 0 | 0.0 | 1.0 | | |
| Green | 0 | | | 0 | 0.0 | <1.0 | | |
| Alliance for Green Socialism | 0 | | | 0 | 0.0 | <1.0 | | |

== By-elections between 2009-2011 ==
=== Marl (2011) ===
20 January 2011 - Liberal Democrat gain from Conservative. This followed the resignation of a Conservative councillor.

=== Uwchaled (2011) ===
16 June 2011 - Independent gain from Plaid Cymru.
