= Risca East =

Community in Caerphilly, Wales

Coordinates: 51°36′35″N 3°05′13″W

- Community

- Location within Caerphilly
- Area: 2.75 km^{2} (1.06 sq mi)
- Population: 6,464 (2011 census)
  - Density: 2,351/km^{2} (6,090/sq mi)
- Community: Risca East
- Principal area: Caerphilly
- Country: Wales
- Sovereign state: United Kingdom
- Police: Gwent
- Fire: South Wales
- Ambulance: Welsh
- Website: Risca East Community Council

Elm Drive, Risca East

Risca East is a community and electoral ward in Caerphilly County Borough. It is one of two communities to cover the town of Risca. In 2011 the community and ward had a population of 6464. The community borders Henllys, Risca West and Rogerstone.

The community of Risca East was formed in 2012. In 2023 a change was proposed to merge the community with the neighbouring Risca West to form a new Risca Community Council.
