= 2008 Isle of Anglesey County Council election =

2008 Welsh local government election

Results of the 2008 Isle of Anglesey County Council election

An election was held on Thursday 1 May 2008 to elect members of the Isle of Anglesey County Council in Wales. This was the same day as other United Kingdom local elections. The previous full council election was on 10 June 2004 and the next full council election was held on 2 May 2013.

== Election result ==
Forty county councillors were elected from forty electoral wards (by the 2013 election this had been reduced to 30 councillors and eleven electoral divisions). Seven seats had no election because there were no opposing candidates (this was a reduction in comparison with 2004, when 14 seats were uncontested).

Isle of Anglesey Council Election 2008
Party	Seats	Gains	Losses	Net gain/loss	Seats %	Votes %	Votes	+/−
Independent	23			-5	57.5			
Plaid Cymru	8			-1	20.0			
Labour	5			+4	12.5			
Conservative	2			+1	5.0			
Liberal Democrats	2			+1	5.0			

Following the election a group of Independent councillors, known as the Original Independents and led by Cllr Phil Fowlie, formed a coalition with Plaid Cymru to control the council. Cllr Fowlie resigned from the council (and his Rhosneigr ward) in 2009 after the council continued to be embroiled in controversy.

== By-elections prior to 2013 elections ==
A by-election was held in the Rhosneigr ward in November 2010, following the resignation of Independent councillor (and former council leader) Phil Fowlie in September 2010. The seat was won by independent candidate, Richard Dew, by 261 votes.

== See also ==
- Isle of Anglesey electoral boundary changes 2012
