= 2012 Flintshire County Council election =

Welsh local election

Results of the 2012 Flintshire County Council election

The 2012 Flintshire County Council election took place on 3 May 2012 to elect members of Flintshire Council in Wales. This was on the same day as other 2012 United Kingdom local elections.

== Results ==
Flintshire County Council election 2012
Party	Seats	Gains	Losses	Net gain/loss	Seats %	Votes %	Votes	+/−
Labour	31			+9	44.3	39.9	16,024	+11.3
Independent	23			-3	32.9	38.4	15,426	-0.9
Conservative	8			-1	11.4	10.2	4,080	-2.2
Liberal Democrats	7			-5	10.0	9.4	3,792	-8.6
Plaid Cymru	1			0	1.4	2.0	796	+1.4
Green	0			0	0.0	0.2	61	New
BNP	-	-	-	-	-	-	-	-0.7

Nine seats (5 Lab, 2 Con, 1 Ind & 1 LD) out of seventy were elected unopposed.
