= Caerphilly County Borough Council =

Local government of Caerphilly County Borough, Wales

Caerphilly County Borough Council Cyngor Bwrdeistref Sirol Caerffili (Welsh)

Type
- Type: Principal council

History
- Founded: 1 April 1996
- Preceded by: Islwyn Borough Council; Rhymney Valley District Council; Mid Glamorgan County Council; Gwent County Council

Leadership
- Presiding member: Colin Gordon, Labour since 9 May 2024
- Leader: Jamie Pritchard, Labour since 11 November 2025
- Chief Executive: Ed Edmunds since 30 January 2025

Structure
- Seats: 69 councillors
- Graph of the party split among 69 seats.
- Political groups: Administration (41) Labour (41) Other parties (27) Plaid Cymru (19) Green (1) Independent (7) Vacancy (1) Vacant (1)
- Length of term: 5 years

Elections
- Voting system: First-past-the-post
- Last election: 5 May 2022
- Next election: 6 May 2027

Meeting place
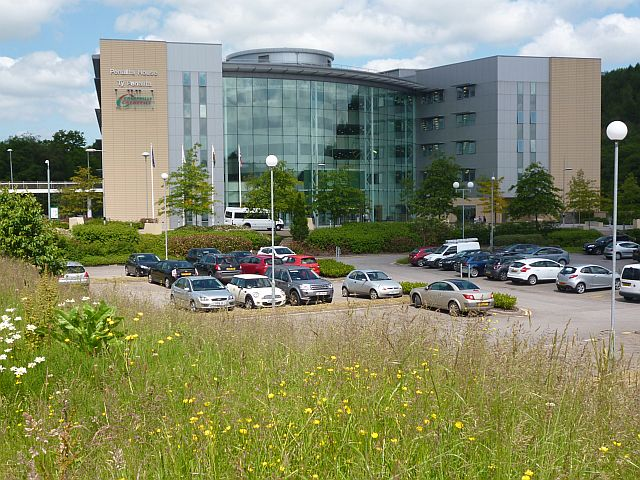
- Penallta House, Tredomen Park, Ystrad Mynach, Hengoed, CF82 7PG

Website
- www.caerphilly.gov.uk

Caerphilly County Borough Council (Welsh: Cyngor Bwrdeistref Sirol Caerffili) is the local authority for the county borough of Caerphilly, one of the principal areas of Wales. The council is based at Penallta House in Ystrad Mynach. The council has been under Labour majority control since 2012. The last full council elections took place on 5 May 2022.

== History ==
The county borough and its council were created on 1 April 1996, covering the area of the abolished Rhymney Valley district of Mid Glamorgan and the Islwyn borough of Gwent. The new council took over the functions of both abolished district councils and of the two abolished county councils.

The council is allowed to appoint a mayor; until 2024 the mayor chaired council meetings and also acted as the council's ceremonial figurehead. In 2024 the separate role of presiding member was created to chair meetings, leaving the mayor a purely ceremonial role. The role of mayor was discontinued in 2026 as a cost saving measure.

== Political control ==
The council has been under Labour majority control since 2012.

The first election to the new council was held in 1995. It initially operated as a shadow authority alongside the outgoing authorities before assuming its powers on 1 April 1996. Political control of the council since 1996 has been as follows:

Party in control	Years
Labour	1996–1999
Plaid Cymru	1999–2004
Labour	2004–2008
No overall control	2008–2012
Labour	2012–present

=== Leadership ===
Political leadership is instead provided by the leader of the council. The first leader, Graham Court, was the last leader of the old Rhymney Valley District Council. The leaders of Caerphilly County Borough Council since 1996 have been:

Councillor	Party	From	To
Graham Court	Labour	1 Apr 1996	May 1999
Lindsay Whittle	Plaid Cymru	20 May 1999	Jun 2004
Harry Andrews	Labour	24 Jun 2004	15 May 2008
Lindsay Whittle	Plaid Cymru	15 May 2008	24 May 2011
Allan Pritchard	Plaid Cymru	24 May 2011	May 2012
Harry Andrews	Labour	24 May 2012	8 May 2014
Keith Reynolds	Labour	8 May 2014	10 Apr 2017
David Poole	Labour	18 May 2017	20 Sep 2019
Philippa Marsden	Labour	19 Nov 2019	May 2022
Sean Morgan	Labour	19 May 2022	11 Sep 2025
Jamie Pritchard	Labour	11 Nov 2025	

=== Composition ===
Following the 2022 election, and subsequent by-elections and changes of allegiance up to October 2026, the composition of the council was:

Party	Seats
Labour	41
Plaid Cymru	19
Green	1
Independent	7
Vacant	1
Total	69

A by-election may be held for the vacant seat. The next full council election is due in 2027.

== Elections ==
Year	Seats	Labour	Plaid Cymru	Independent	Liberal Democrats	Notes
1995	67	**55**	9	3	0	Labour majority controlled
1999	73	28	**38**	6	1	Plaid Cymru majority control
2004	73	**41**	26	6	0	Labour majority control
2008	73	**32**	**32**	9	0	No overall control; Plaid Cymru led administration.
2012	73	**50**	20	3	0	Labour majority control
2017	73	**50**	18	5	0	Labour majority control
2022	69	**45**	18	6	0	Labour majority control

Party with the most elected councillors in bold. Coalition agreements in notes column

== Premises ==
The council is based at Penallta House in Tredomen Park, Ystrad Mynach (in the community of Gelligaer). The building was purpose-built for the council and opened in April 2008.

When first created, the council inherited two main offices from its predecessor authorities: Ystrad Fawr House at Ystrad Mynach from Rhymney Valley District Council, and Pontllanfraith House in Pontllanfraith from Islwyn Borough Council. Ystrad Fawr House was demolished in 2008 to make way for the Ysbyty Ystrad Fawr hospital. The other office at Pontllanfraith House subsequently closed in 2015 and has since been demolished.

== Electoral divisions ==
The county borough is divided into 30 electoral wards returning 69 councillors. Many of these wards are coterminous with communities (parishes) of the same name. The following table lists council wards, communities and community ward areas.

Ward	Communities	Community ward	Councillors
Aber Valley	Aber Valley	Abertridwr, Senghenydd	3
Aberbargoed and Bargoed	Bargoed	Aberbargoed, Bargoed	3
Aber-carn	Aber-carn	Aber-carn	2
Argoed	Argoed	Argoed, Hollybush, Markham	1
Bedwas and Trethomas	Bedwas, Trethomas and Machen	Bedwas, Trethomas	3
Blackwood	Blackwood	Blackwood Central, Blackwood North, Blackwood South, Cefn Fforest East	3
Cefn Fforest and Pengam	Cefn Fforest, Pengam	Cefn Fforest, Pengam	3
Crumlin	Crumlin	Crumlin	2
Darran Valley	Darran Valley	Deri, Fochriw	1
Gilfach	Bargoed	Gilfach	1
Hengoed	Gelligaer	Cefn Hengoed, Hengoed	2
Llanbradach	Llanbradach and Pwllypant	Llanbradach, Pwllypant, Wingfield	2
Machen and Rudry	Bedwas, Trethomas and Machen, Rudry	Llanfedw, Machen, Rhydygwern, Rudry	2
Maesycwmmer	Maesycwmmer	Maesycwmmer	1
Morgan Jones	Caerphilly	Bryncenydd, Parcyfelin, Tonyfelin	3
Moriah and Pontlottyn	Rhymney	Abertysswg, Moriah, Pontlottyn, St David's	2
Nelson	Nelson	Llanfabon, Llwyncelyn	2
New Tredegar	New Tredegar	Brithdir, Cwmsyfiog, New Tredegar, Phillipstown, Tir-phil	2
Newbridge	Newbridge	Newbridge	3
Penmaen	Penmaen	Penmaen	2
Penyrheol	Penyrheol, Trecenydd and Energlyn	Energlyn, Penyrheol, Trecenydd	4
Pontllanfraith	Pontllanfraith	Pontllanfraith, Springfield	3
Risca East	Risca East	Pontymister and Ty-Sign, Pontymister Upper, Trenewydd	3
Risca West	Risca West	Pontymister Lower, Risca Danygraig, Risca Fernlea and Town, Ty-Isaf Fields Road	2
St Cattwg	Gelligaer	Cascade, Greenhill, Tir-y-berth	3
St Martins	Caerphilly	Castle, Cwrt Rawlins, Twyn, Watford	3
Twyn Carno	Rhymney	Twyn Carno	1
Van	Van	Brynau, Lansbury, Porset	2
Ystrad Mynach	Gelligaer	Ystrad Mynach	3

=== Former wards ===
Until 2022, the county borough was divided into 33 electoral wards returning 73 councillors. Communities with a community council are indicated with a '*':

Ward	Communities (Parishes)	Other geographic areas
Aberbargoed	Bargoed Town* (Aberbargoed ward)	Bedwellty
Abercarn	Abercarn	Chapel of Ease, Cwmcarn, Llanfach, West End
Aber Valley	Aber Valley*	Senghenydd, Abertridwr
Argoed	Argoed*	Cwm Corrwg, Hollybush, Manmoel, Markham
Bargoed	Bargoed Town* (Bargoed and Park wards)	Gilfach Estate
Bedwas, Trethomas and Machen	Bedwas, Trethomas and Machen*	Bedwas, Trethomas, Machen, Graig-y-Rhacca
Blackwood	Blackwood Town*	Britannia, Cwm Gelli, Highfields
Cefn Fforest	Cefn Fforest	
Crosskeys	Crosskeys	Pontywaun
Crumlin	Crumlin	Bont Pren, Croespenmaen, Hafodyrnynys, Kendon, Treowen, Trinant
Darran Valley	Darran Valley*	Deri, Groesfaen, Pentwyn, Fochriw
Gilfach	Bargoed Town* (Gilfach ward)	
Hengoed	Gelligaer* (Cefn Hengoed and Hengoed wards)	
Llanbradach	Llanbradach & Pwllypant*	
Maesycwmmer	Maesycwmmer*	
Morgan Jones	Caerphilly Town* (Bryncenydd, Parcyfelin and Tonyfelin wards)	Bryncenydd, Churchill Park, Pontypandy
Moriah	Rhymney* (Abertysswg, Moriah and St.David's wards)	Abertysswg, Tan-y-bryn
Nelson	Nelson*	
Newbridge	Newbridge	Cwmdows, Pant, Pentwynmawr
New Tredegar	New Tredegar*	Brithdir, Phillipstown, Tirphil, Elliotstown, Cwmsyfiog
Pengam	Pengam	Britannia, Fleur de Lis, Gellihaf
Penmain	Penmain (Penmaen)	Oakdale, Pen-y-fan, Woodfieldside
Penyrheol	Penyrheol, Trecenydd and Energlyn*	Trecenydd, Hendredenny, Energlyn, Groeswen
Pontllanfraith	Pontllanfraith	Bryn, Gelligroes, Springfield, Penllwyn
Pontlottyn	Rhymney* (Pontlottyn ward)	
Risca East	That part of the Community of Risca bounded by a line commencing at the point on the boundary of the former borough of Islwyn at Grid Reference ST 24879259, thence southwards along a track to Grid Reference ST 24799214, thence southwestwards along a cart track to Grid Reference ST 24679204, thence southwestwards along field boundaries to the stream at Grid Reference ST 24459185, thence along that stream southwestwards to the place where it enters the Monmouthshire Canal.	Ty Sign
Risca West	The area of Risca not contained in Risca East	
St. Cattwg	Gelligaer*	Cascade, Cefn Hengoed, Glan-y-nant, Penpedairheol, Tir-y-berth
St. James	Rudry*, Van*	Lansbury Park, Mornington Meadows, Waterloo, Llwyn Gwyn
St. Martins	Caerphilly Town* (Castle, Twyn and Watford wards)	Watford, Bonfield Park, Castle View
Twyn Carno	Rhymney* (Twyn Carno ward)	Llechryd, Princetown
Ynysddu	Ynysddu	Brynawel, Wattsville, Wyllie, Cwmfelinfach, Mynyddislyn
Ystrad Mynach	Gelligaer* (Ystrad Mynach ward)	Tredomen, Penallta
