= Dick Uzzell =

Wales international rugby union player

- Full name: John Richard Uzzell
- Born: 28 March 1942 (age 84) Deri, Caerphilly, Wales
- School: Bargoed Grammar School
- University: St Luke's College Exeter
- Notable relative: Brian Price (cousin)

Rugby union career
- Position: Centre
International career
Years	Team	Apps	(Points)
1963–65	Wales	5	(0)

John Richard Uzzell (born 28 March 1942) is a Welsh former rugby union international.

== Biography ==
Uzzell grew up in the town of Deri in Caerphilly and attended Bargoed Grammar School.

=== Rugby career ===
A centre, Uzzell was a Wales Schools representative and played his early rugby with Cross Keys, before joining Newport in the 1961–62 season, on the recommendation of his cousin Brian Price. He is best remembered for a drop goal he kicked against the All Blacks at Rodney Parade in 1963. His 17th-minute drop goal was the only score of a 3–0 win, which made Newport the only side to beat the All Blacks during their 36-match tour.

Uzzell, capped five times, made his Wales debut against the 1963 All Blacks at Cardiff Arms Park, two months after his famous goal. He featured in all four matches of the 1965 Five Nations Championship, as Wales claimed the triple crown.

== See also ==
- List of Wales national rugby union players
