= Wattsville (disambiguation) =

Wattsville is a small village in south Wales.

Wattsville may also refer to:

- Wattsville, Alabama, an unincorporated community
- Wattsville, Ohio, an unincorporated community
- Wattsville, Virginia, a census-designated place
- Wattsville F.C., a Welsh football team
