= Grade II* listed buildings in Caerphilly County Borough =

Caerphilly County Borough shown within Wales

In the United Kingdom, the term listed building refers to a building or other structure officially designated as being of special architectural, historical, or cultural significance; Grade II* structures are those considered to be "particularly important buildings of more than special interest". Listing was begun by a provision in the Town and Country Planning Act 1947. Once listed, strict limitations are imposed on the modifications allowed to a building's structure or fittings. In Wales, the authority for listing under the Planning (Listed Buildings and Conservation Areas) Act 1990 rests with Cadw.

== Buildings ==
Name	Location Grid Ref. (Note: Sometimes known as OSGB36, the grid reference is based on the British national grid reference system used by the Ordnance Survey.) Geo-coordinates	Date Listed	Function	Notes	Reference Number	Image
Gelligroes Mill	Pontllanfraith; ST1779194715; 51°38′43″N 3°11′22″W	25 May 1962	Mill	Reached by a side road running SE from Newport Road (A4048); the Mill faces the Sirhowy River and the bridge and is within a grassy enclosure which retains sluices, channelled millrace and tail race, grinding stones and other machinery.	1880	See more images
Penllwyn, former manor house now Penllwyn Arms public house	Pontllanfraith; ST1740695592; 51°39′11″N 3°11′43″W	25 May 1962	Inn	On the hillside W of the town centre, in an open space but surrounded by Penllwyn estate development.	1881	Penllwyn, former manor house now Penllwyn Arms public house
Church of St Tudor Mynyddislwyn	Ynysddu; ST1933593917; 51°38′18″N 3°10′01″W	25 May 1962	Church	On the crest of Mynyddislwyn, surrounded by a walled churchyard.	1882	See more images
Navigation Colliery Chimney	Crumlin; ST2110798790; 51°40′56″N 3°08′33″W	27 January 1982	Colliery chimney	In the centre of the main Revetment Wall, between the N and S Winding Engine Houses and close to the Workshops and Store, and Lamp Room to rear.	1890	See more images
Navigation Colliery South Winding Engine House	Crumlin; ST2114098740; 51°40′55″N 3°08′31″W	27 January 1982	Colliery engine house	Standing on the main Revetment Wall at the S end. Paired with the North Winding Engine House at N end.	1891	Navigation Colliery South Winding Engine House
Navigation Colliery North Winding Engine House	Crumlin; ST2110598841; 51°40′58″N 3°08′33″W	27 January 1982	Colliery engine house	Standing on the main Revetment Wall at the N end. Paired with the South Winding Engine House at S end.	1894	Navigation Colliery North Winding Engine House
Navigation Colliery Power House and Pump House	Crumlin; ST2112098860; 51°40′59″N 3°08′32″W	27 January 1982	Colliery power house	Located on a lane N from Kendon Road near the centre of Crumlin. At the N end of the colliery complex at road level, paired in position with the Fan House on the other side of the Heapstead.	1896	Navigation Colliery Power House and Pump House
Navigation Colliery Fan House and Fan Drift	Crumlin; ST2116098750; 51°40′55″N 3°08′30″W	27 January 1982	Colliery fan house	Located on a lane N from Kendon Road near the centre of Crumlin. At the S end of the colliery complex at road level, paired in position with the Power House on the other side of the Heapstead.	1897	Navigation Colliery Fan House and Fan Drift
Cwmdows Farmhouse	Newbridge; ST2048096923; 51°39′56″N 3°09′04″W	27 January 1982	Farmhouse	Aligned N/S at right angles to the road, set on a platform in the hillside and now surrounded by C19 and later housing development.	1899	Upload Photo
Church of St Luke, Abercarn	Abercarn; ST2164095077; 51°38′57″N 3°08′02″W	3 May 1987	Church (disused)	Set into the wooded hillside above the Ebbw Vale just above the centre of Abercarn, reached up a side road and approached through a shallow stone tiled gateway and up a steep terraced double flight of steps to W front.	1903	See more images
Church of St Barrwg	Bedwas, Bedwas, Trethomas and Machen; ST1710889196; 51°35′44″N 3°11′53″W	23 November 1961	Church	Located in a high prominent position in the village at the N end of Church Street. Surrounded by a large graveyard.	13542	See more images
Hengoed Viaduct	Gelligaer; ST1542294936; 51°38′49″N 3°13′26″W	31 July 1980	Viaduct	A prominent landscape feature spanning the Rhymney Valley between Maesycwmmer and Hengoed. Partly in Maesycwmmer Community.	13566	See more images
The Woollen Mill, Maesycwmmer	Maesycwmmer; ST1544494894; 51°38′47″N 3°13′24″W	31 July 1980	Woollen Mill	Backing onto the River Rhymney beneath the Hengoed railway viaduct. Accessed from the driveway to Maesycwmmer House	13567	Upload Photo
Groeswen Chapel	Groeswen, Penyrheol, Trecenydd and Energlyn; ST1279787000; 51°34′30″N 3°15′35″W	8 April 1987	Chapel	Set within its burial ground, the chapel faces the road with vestry adjoining to the W. Located at the E end of Groeswen village.	13573	See more images
Church of St David, Rhymney	Rhymney; SO1118208026; 51°45′50″N 3°17′18″W	7 December 1990	Church	On the main thoroughfare a little N of the town centre, surrounded by an extensive walled churchyard sloping to S and W.	13578	See more images
Penallta Colliery Engine Hall and Fan House	Gelligaer; ST1398095839; 51°39′17″N 3°14′41″W	11 May 1991	Engine house	Situated between Ystrad Mynach and Gelligaer, on the east side of Penalltau Road. The Engine Hall is at the north side of the colliery complex.	13579	Penallta Colliery Engine Hall and Fan House
Penallta Colliery Baths Building	Gelligaer; ST1387695717; 51°39′13″N 3°14′47″W	11 May 1991	Colliery baths	Situated between Ystrad Mynach and Gelligaer, on the east side of Penalltau Road. The Baths Building faces Penalltau Road, on the west of the complex.	13580	Upload Photo
Penallta Colliery No.1 Headframe	Gelligaer; ST1396295780; 51°39′15″N 3°14′42″W	11 May 1991	Colliery headstock	Situated between Ystrad Mynach and Gelligaer, on the east side of Penalltau Road. The western of the two headframes, at the centre of the complex.	13585	Penallta Colliery No.1 Headframe
Penallta Colliery No.2 Headframe	Gelligaer; ST1401995812; 51°39′16″N 3°14′39″W	11 May 1991	Colliery headstock	Situated between Ystrad Mynach and Gelligaer, on the east side of Penalltau Road. The eastern of the two headframes, at the east of the complex.	13586	Penallta Colliery No.2 Headframe
Ruperra Castle	Rudry; ST2197986311; 51°34′13″N 3°07′38″W	5 August 1964	Castle	About 2.5km E of Rudry Church, on high ground above Rhymney valley and reached by private drive W of minor road between Michaelston-y-Fedw and Draethen.	14069	See more images
Tabor United Reformed Church, Maesycwmmer	Maesycwmmer; ST1558994743; 51°38′43″N 3°13′17″W	14 October 1997	Church	On prominent site fronting Tabor Road with North Avenue to the rear.	18961	Tabor United Reformed Church, Maesycwmmer
Bryngwyn Colliery Engine House	Bedwas, Bedwas, Trethomas and Machen; ST1620389288; 51°35′46″N 3°12′40″W	2 August 1999	Engine House	Located in a small field on the W side of Bedwas village. The building is accessible by footpath, either from Pandy Mawr Road to the W or from Nursery Road (?) to the E. The building is heavily overgrown with vegetation.	21311	Upload Photo
Hanbury Road Baptist Chapel and Schoolrooms, including gates and gatepiers	Bargoed; ST1516899734; 51°41′24″N 3°13′43″W	3 January 1999	Public library	Situated in the centre of Bargoed, about 150m N of the police station, set back behind small forecourt with railings.	21428	Hanbury Road Baptist Chapel and Schoolrooms, including gates and gatepiers
Penuel Baptist Church	Rhymney; SO1107308241; 51°45′57″N 3°17′24″W	3 January 1999	Church	Located some 100m W of Post Office, on NW side of street, set in grassed yard with iron railings.	21430	Penuel Baptist Church
Church of Our Lady of Peace and attached Presbytery	Newbridge; ST2106797620; 51°40′19″N 3°08′34″W	17 March 1999	Church/Presbytery	On the N edge of Newbridge, near the border with the Crumlin Community, on the W hillside of and overlooking the Ebbw Valley. Set on a walled terrace with gate piers and terraced steps, incorporating a small shrine.	21499	See more images
Tomb of William Edwards in the churchyard of St Ilan, Eglwysilan	Aber Valley; ST1065288983; 51°35′33″N 3°17′28″W	28 June 1999	Tomb	On the S side of the nave to SW of the porch, adjacent to path on the W side.	21957	Upload Photo
Hengoed Viaduct	Maesycwmmer; ST1556094920; 51°38′48″N 3°13′18″W	31 July 1980	Viaduct	A prominent landscape feature spanning the Rhymney valley between Maesycwmmer and Hengoed.	22325	See more images
Elliot Colliery Winding Engine House and Engine	New Tredegar; SO1473802720; 51°43′00″N 3°14′08″W	22 June 2001	Colliery Engine House	Now standing on a terrace with landscaped surroundings above the E bank of Rhymney River, S of New Tredegar centre, in the area known as Elliot'sTown.	25495	Elliot Colliery Winding Engine House and Engine
Church of St Sannan	Bargoed; SO1665800309; 51°41′43″N 3°12′26″W	17 July 2001	Church	In a large churchyard on the ridge of hill approximately 1.5km NE of Bargoed.	25522	See more images
Blackwood Miners Welfare Institute	Blackwood; ST1739497425; 51°40′10″N 3°11′45″W	31 May 2002	Miner's Welfare	At the N end of High Street approximately 240m S of the parish church.	26710	See more images

== See also ==
- Listed buildings in Wales
- Grade I listed buildings in Caerphilly County Borough
- List of Scheduled Monuments in Caerphilly
- Registered historic parks and gardens in Caerphilly County Borough
