= Registered historic parks and gardens in Caerphilly County Borough =

List of buildings in county borough of Wales

Caerphilly County Borough shown within Wales

Caerphilly County Borough is a county borough in south-east Wales. It covers an area of 227 km^{2} (88 sq mi). In 2021 the population was approximately 176,000.

The Cadw/ICOMOS Register of Parks and Gardens of Special Historic Interest in Wales was established in 2002 and given statutory status in 2022. It is administered by Cadw, the historic environment agency of the Welsh Government. Elisabeth Whittle described Cadw as having a "somewhat special and guiding role" in the preservation of historic parks and gardens, since they are "an integral part of Welsh archaeological and architectural heritage". The register includes just under 400 sites, ranging from gardens of private houses, to cemeteries and public parks. Parks and gardens are listed at one of three grades, matching the grading system used for listed buildings. Grade I is the highest grade, for sites of exceptional interest; Grade II*, the next highest, denotes parks and gardens of great quality; while Grade II denotes sites of special interest.

There are five registered parks and gardens in Caerphilly County Borough. All five are listed at Grade II.

== Key ==
Grade	Criteria
I	Parks and gardens of exceptional interest
II*	Parks and gardens of great quality
II	Parks and gardens of special interest

== List of parks and gardens ==
List of parks and gardens
Name	Location Grid Ref. (Note: Sometimes known as OSGB36, the grid reference is based on the British national grid reference system used by the Ordnance Survey.) Geo-coordinates	Date Listed	Description / Notes	Grade	Reference Number	Image
Cefn Mably	Rudry; ST2178384158; 51°33′01″N 3°07′42″W	1 February 2022	Park and country house garden The house is surrounded by gardens of formal terraces and informal woodland. Its present form developed from the early eighteenth century and by the late nineteenth century the park was fully developed and the general layout established. The walls of the former kitchen garden are grade II listed. The house (also grade II) was badly damaged by fire in 1994.	II	PGW(Gm)11(CAE)	A view of a large mansion with a garden in the foreground and flower beds
Maes Manor	Blackwood; ST1739398841; 51°40′54″N 3°11′42″W	1 February 2022	Country house garden The garden, designed c. 1907 by Thomas H Mawson, is formal and architectural in design. To the south of the house are a series of grass terraces. To the north was a rectangular walled garden, the interior layout of which has gone and been partly built over.	II	PGW(Gm)54(CAE)	a large stone building with shrubs and grass in the foreground
Ruperra Castle	Rudry; ST2188986437; 51°34′15″N 3°07′38″W	1 February 2022	Park and country house garden The deer park, known to have been present in 1764, may have been of medieval origin. The Jacobean mock castle (built 1626) is surrounded by gardens and pleasure grounds. In the early twentieth century the formal gardens were elaborately laid out with an Edwardian glasshouse as the centrepiece. However, the house was abandoned after being gutted by fire in 1941.	II	PGW(Gm)17(CAE)	a ruinous castle with trees and grassland
The Van	Van; ST1652586901; 51°34′28″N 3°12′17″W	1 February 2022	Country house garden Van House was built mainly in the late Tudor period and incorporated parts of an earlier sixteenth-century structure. The gardens are thought to be contemporary with the rebuilding of the house and include a walled and terraced garden adjoining the house. At the north of the site is a grade II listed dovecote.	II	PGW(Gm)13(CAE)	a group of stone buildings amongst farmland and forests
Welsh National and Universal Mining Disaster Memorial Garden	Senghenydd; ST1141891105; 51°36′42″N 3°16′50″W	12 March 2024	Memorial garden Opened in 2013 to commemorate the anniversary of the Senghenydd colliery disaster of 1913 and dedicated to all who lost their lives in colliery disasters in Wales. Landscape architect, Stephanie Wilkins, designed the layout and planting scheme making use of local materials. Features include a life-size bronze statue of two miners, sculpted by Les Johnson, a wooden sculpture titled 'Waiting for News' by Dai Edwards, and wall of remembrance on which are 521 individual clay tiles naming the victims of 1913 and an earlier disaster of 1901.	II	PGW(Gm)78(CAE)	bronze sculpture of two miners

== See also ==
- List of scheduled monuments in Caerphilly
- Grade I listed buildings in Caerphilly County Borough
- Grade II* listed buildings in Caerphilly County Borough
