= List of scheduled monuments in Caerphilly County Borough =

Caerphilly County Borough straddles the boundary of the historic counties of Glamorgan and Monmouthshire in South Wales. The 46 scheduled monuments include burial cairns from the Bronze Age, an Iron Age hillfort, and Roman camps. The medieval sites include two castles and a further four mottes as well as dwellings, crosses and churches. Finally the post-medieval sites include the blast furnaces and ironworks of the industrial period.

Scheduled monuments have statutory protection. The compilation of the list is undertaken by Cadw Welsh Historic Monuments, which is an executive agency of the National Assembly of Wales. The list of scheduled monuments below is supplied by Cadw with additional material from RCAHMW and Glamorgan-Gwent Archaeological Trust.

== Scheduled monuments in Caerphilly ==
Image	Name	Site type	Community	Location	Details	Historic County	Period	SAM No & Refs
	Cairnfield on Mynydd Eglwysilan	Round cairn	Aber Valley	51.6223°N 3.2792°W, ST115922		Glamorganshire	Prehistoric	GM352
	Garnedd Lwyd	Round cairn	Aber Valley	51.6051°N 3.2904°W, ST107903		Glamorganshire	Prehistoric	GM462
	Two Round Cairns on the Bryn	Round cairn	Aber Valley	51.6096°N 3.2479°W, ST136908		Glamorganshire	Prehistoric	GM463
	Begwns Round Barrow, Mynydd Machen	Round cairn	Bedwas, Trethomas and Machen	51.6036°N 3.1222°W, ST223900		Monmouthshire	Prehistoric	MM071
	Cairn 270m N of Pont Ffosyrhebog	Round cairn	Darran Valley	51.7168°N 3.2857°W, SO112027		Glamorganshire	Prehistoric	GM313
Maen Cattwg	Maen Cattwg (cup-marked stone)	Cup-marked stone	Gelligaer	51.6689°N 3.2638°W, ST126974		Glamorganshire	Prehistoric	GM176
	Bryn Owen Farm Cairns, Llanfabon	Round cairn	Llanbradach	51.6096°N 3.2378°W, ST143908		Glamorganshire	Prehistoric	GM051
	Cairn Cemetery on Mynydd Bach, Bedwas	Round cairn	Maesycwmmer	51.6206°N 3.2025°W, ST168919		Monmouthshire	Prehistoric	MM196
	Pen-y-Rhiw Round Cairn	Round cairn	Maesycwmmer	51.6204°N 3.2033°W, ST167919		Monmouthshire	Prehistoric	MM149
	Carneddi Llwydion	Round cairn	Nelson	51.6198°N 3.294°W, ST105920		Glamorganshire	Prehistoric	GM302
	Round Cairn 315m S of Upper Wenallt	Round cairn	Risca	51.609°N 3.0754°W, ST256905		Monmouthshire	Prehistoric	MM046
	Twyn Cae-Hugh Round Barrow	Round barrow	Ynysddu	51.6163°N 3.1947°W, ST173915		Monmouthshire	Prehistoric	MM033
	Twyn-Yr-Oerfel Round Barrows	Round barrow	Ynysddu	51.6091°N 3.1839°W, ST181906		Monmouthshire	Prehistoric	MM070
Hill Fort on Craig Ruperra	Ruperra Hillfort and Motte	Hillfort	Rudry	51.5733°N 3.1231°W, ST222866		Glamorganshire	Prehistoric	GM511
	Cefn Manmoel cross-ridge dyke	Cross Ridge Dyke	Argoed, (also Cwm, Blaenau Gwent)	51.7442°N 3.2018°W, SO171057	Linear defensive earthwork which may be from neolithic or medieval period. This site crosses the border into Blaenau Gwent	Monmouthshire	Unknown	MM345
	Rectangular Earthworks 530m SSW of Heol-Ddu-Uchaf	Practice camp	Bargoed	51.6845°N 3.2477°W, ST138991		Glamorganshire	Roman	GM164
	Fforest Gwladys Roman practice camp	Practice camp	Gelligaer	51.6838°N 3.2579°W, ST131990		Glamorganshire	Roman	GM273
Gelligaer Roman Fort site	Gelligaer Roman Site	Fort	Gelligaer	51.667°N 3.2548°W, ST133972		Glamorganshire	Roman	GM016
	Fort South of Pen-Llwyn-Fawr	Fort	Pontllanfraith	51.651°N 3.195°W, ST174953		Monmouthshire	Roman	MM096
	Cross Ridge Dyke & Cairn on Twyn Hywel	Cross Ridge Dyke	Aber Valley, (also Pontypridd)	51.6116°N 3.3007°W, ST100911	(The dyke crosses the border into Rhondda Cynon Taf)	Glamorganshire	Unknown	GM456
Capel Gwladys memorial	Capel Gwladys	Chapel	Darran Valley	51.6856°N 3.2671°W, ST125992		Glamorganshire	Early Medieval	GM309
	Dyke 387m E of Clawdd Trawscae Farm	Ditch	Darran Valley	51.6944°N 3.278°W, SO117002		Glamorganshire	Early Medieval	GM261
	Site of Tegernacus Stone	Inscribed stone	Darran Valley	51.7157°N 3.2498°W, SO137026		Glamorganshire	Early Medieval	GM339
St Sannan's churchyard, cross and lych gate, Bedwellty	St. Sannan's Churchyard Cross, Bedwellty	Cross	Argoed	51.6951°N 3.2074°W, SO166002		Monmouthshire	Medieval	MM310
Remains of church cross, Bedwas	Bedwas Churchyard Cross	Cross	Bedwas, Trethomas and Machen	51.5954°N 3.1981°W, ST171891		Monmouthshire	Medieval	MM143
	House Platforms to W of Mynydd Machen	House platform	Bedwas, Trethomas and Machen	51.6043°N 3.1249°W, ST221900		Monmouthshire	Medieval	MM337
Caerphilly Castle	Caerphilly Castle	Castle	Caerphilly	51.5763°N 3.2206°W, ST155870		Glamorganshire	Medieval	GM002
Ruins of Castell Morgraig	Castell Morgraig	Castle	Caerphilly, (also Lisvane)	51.5519°N 3.213°W, ST159843	(Site is on the border with Cardiff)	Glamorganshire	Medieval	GM031
Capel y Brithdir	Capel y Brithdir	Chapel	Darran Valley	51.7149°N 3.2481°W, SO138025		Glamorganshire	Medieval	GM451
	Platform Houses on East Side of Gelligaer Common	Platform house	Darran Valley	51.7164°N 3.2806°W, SO116027		Glamorganshire	Medieval	GM311
	Three Platform Houses on Cefn Brithdir	Platform house	Darran Valley	51.7193°N 3.2623°W, SO128030		Glamorganshire	Medieval	GM317
	Twyn Castell	Motte	Gelligaer	51.6646°N 3.2496°W, ST136969		Glamorganshire	Medieval	GM121
Twmbarlwm from Mynydd Henllys	Twmbarlwm Mound and Bailey Castle	Motte	Risca	51.6272°N 3.0961°W, ST243926		Monmouthshire	Medieval	MM044
	Gwern-y-Domen Castle Mound	Motte	Van	51.5837°N 3.192°W, ST175878		Glamorganshire	Medieval	GM218
Twyn Tudur. (Tudor's Mound), Mynyddislwyn	Twyn Tudor	Motte	Ynysddu	51.6373°N 3.1669°W, ST193938		Monmouthshire	Medieval	MM035
	Charcoal Blast Furnace at Abercarn	Blast Furnace	Abercarn	51.6471°N 3.1342°W, ST216948		Monmouthshire	Post-Medieval/Modern	MM250
	Cornish Type Engine House, Bryngwyn Colliery	Engine house	Bedwas, Trethomas and Machen	51.5962°N 3.2111°W, ST162892		Glamorganshire	Post-Medieval/Modern	GM440
	Machen Forge and Tinplate Works	Water Power System	Bedwas, Trethomas and Machen	51.593°N 3.1511°W, ST203888		Glamorganshire	Post-Medieval/Modern	GM516
	Caerffili Mountain Shaft Mounds	Shaft Mounds	Caerphilly	51.5583°N 3.2229°W, ST153850		Glamorganshire	Post-Medieval/Modern	GM454
	Former Dam of Cwmcarn Canal Reservoir	Dam	Crosskeys	51.6353°N 3.1249°W, ST222935		Monmouthshire	Post-Medieval/Modern	MM259
Sunset at Pen-y-fan Pond	Pen-y-fan Pond	Reservoir	Crumlin	51.6979°N 3.1641°W, SO196005	Canal Reservoir	Monmouthshire	Post-Medieval/Modern	MM269
	Caerphilly Iron Furnace	Ironworks	Penyrheol, Trecenydd and Energlyn	51.5815°N 3.2394°W, ST142876		Glamorganshire	Post-Medieval/Modern	GM503
Rhymney Upper Furnace	Rhymney Upper Furnace	Blast Furnace	Rhymney	51.7741°N 3.2934°W, SO108091		Glamorganshire	Post-Medieval/Modern	GM403
	Rudry Ironworks	Ironworks	Rudry	51.5873°N 3.1622°W, ST195882		Glamorganshire	Post-Medieval/Modern	GM357
Ruperra Castle	Ruperra Castle	House (domestic)	Rudry	51.5703°N 3.1271°W, ST219863		Glamorganshire	Post-Medieval/Modern	GM379
	Ruperra Castle lower summerhouse remains	Garden building	Rudry	51.5729°N 3.1221°W, ST223866		Glamorganshire	Post-Medieval/Modern	GM590

Scheduled monuments in Caerphilly, Wales.
=Prehistoric =Roman =Early Medieval =Medieval =Post-Medieval/Modern

== See also ==
- List of Cadw properties
- List of castles in Wales
- List of hill forts in Wales
- Historic houses in Wales
- List of monastic houses in Wales
- List of museums in Wales
- List of Roman villas in Wales
- Grade I listed buildings in Caerphilly
- Grade II* listed buildings in Caerphilly
