= Brian Price (rugby union) =

British Lions & Wales international rugby union footballer (1937–2023)

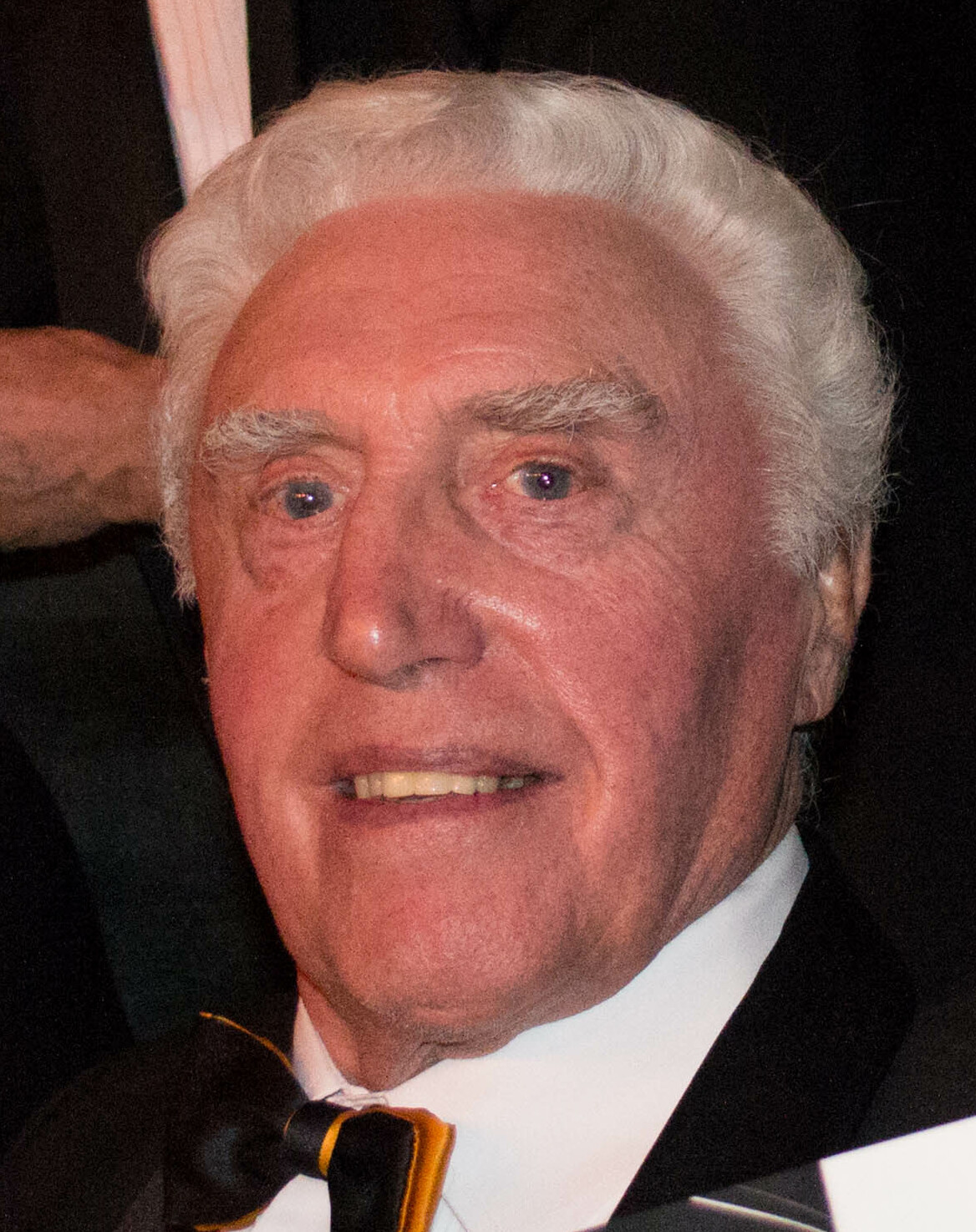
- Price in 2014
- Born: Brian Price; 30 October 1937 Deri, Caerphilly County Borough, Wales
- Died: 18 December 2023 (aged 86)
- Height: 1.93 m (6 ft 4 in)
- Weight: 101 kg (15 st 13 lb)
- University: Cardiff College of Education; St Luke's College, Exeter

Rugby union career
- Position: Lock
Amateur team(s)
Years	Team	Apps	(Points)
- Cardiff College of Education
- St Luke's College, Exeter
1960	Cross Keys RFC		
1960-69	Newport RFC		
–	Barbarian F.C.		
International career
Years	Team	Apps	(Points)
1961–69	Wales	32	(0)
1966	British Lions	4	(0)

Brian Price (30 October 1937 – 18 December 2023) was a Wales international rugby union player. Price first played international rugby for Wales in 1961 after impressing in the Barbarians squad against South Africa. He was selected for the 1966 British Lions tour of Australia and New Zealand playing in all four tests, and spent the majority of his career playing at club level for Newport. A teacher by profession he later became a journalist and sports presenter for radio and television. In 2006 he became President of the Former Player Association.

== Rugby career ==
Price was born in Deri near Bargoed in South Wales. After leaving national service he took a place at St Luke's College, Exeter and represented the college's rugby team. He also played for Cardiff College of Education, where he gained a teaching qualification, later becoming a PE and a Technical Drawing teacher at Thomas Richard Mining & Tech Institute in Tredegar and Caldicot Comprehensive.

After leaving education he played briefly for Cross Keys RFC before joining Newport in 1960. In early 1961 Price was part of the Newport team who narrowly lost to the touring South Africa squad. Less than a month later he was selected to play for the Barbarians against the same South African team, beating them 6–0. Uncapped at the time, his performance for the Barbarians saw him fast-tracked into the Wales international team playing against Ireland just a month later in the 1961 Five Nations Championship.

He captained the club, most notably in the victory against the 1963 New Zealand All Blacks and attained 32 international caps for Wales including Triple Crown wins in 1965 and 1969 as captain of Wales. He was selected for Wales' first overseas tour in 1964 and played in the Welsh rugby team's first match outside of Europe and its first in the Southern Hemisphere; played against East Africa in Nairobi on 12 May 1964, Wales winning 8-26. He played 252 games for Newport in all scoring 16 tries.

Price also played for the British and Irish Lions on the 1966 tour of Australia and New Zealand.

== Death ==
Price died on 18 December 2023, at the age of 86.

== Bibliography ==
- Billot, John (1974). Springboks in Wales. Ferndale: Ron Jones Publications.
- Jenkins, John M.; et al. (1991). Who's Who of Welsh International Rugby Players. Wrexham: Bridge Books. ISBN 1-872424-10-4.

Rugby Union Captain
Preceded by Glyn Davidge	Newport RFC captain 1963/64	Succeeded by David Watkins
Preceded by Martin Webber	Newport RFC captain 1968/69	Succeeded by John Anthony
