= North Gwent Football League =

- Founded: 1961
- Country: Wales
- Number of clubs: 27
- Level on pyramid: 7 (plus reserves divisions)
- Promotion to: Gwent County League
- Domestic cup(s): Roly Parfitt Cup; Tom Perkins Cup
- Current champions: Newbridge Town (2025–26)

The North Gwent Football League (currently billed as the Premier Financial Services North Gwent Football League for sponsorship reasons) is a football league in South Wales. The headquarters are located at The Ex-Servicemens Club, Ebbw Vale.

The league was formed in 1961 as a merger of the Abertillery League and the Ebbw Vale League, originally as the North Monmouthshire Amateur League. The league first formed a reserve division for the 2007–08 season.

== Area ==
The league's area comprises the following areas: Blackwood, Ebbw Vale, Tredegar, Rhymney, Maesycwmmer, Wattsville, Hafodyrynys and Llanelly Hill.

== Member clubs for 2026–27 season ==
=== Premier Division ===
- Ashvale
- Beaufort Colts
- Blackwood Town
- Fleur De Lys
- Garnlydan
- Maesycwmmer
- Pengam BG
- Rhymney Rovers
- Twyn-Y-Ffald Blues

=== Reserve Division One ===
- Aberbargoed Buds (reserves)
- Abertillery Bluebirds (development)
- Ashvale (reserves)
- Cefn Fforest (reserves)
- Blackwood Town (reserves)
- Nantyglo (reserves)
- Newbridge Town (development)
- Wattsville (reserves)

=== Reserve Division Two ===
- Aberbargoed Buds (development)
- Brynmawr United (development)
- Fleur De Lys (reserves)
- Garnlydan (reserves)
- Nantyglo (development)
- Pentwynmawr Athletic (development)
- Pengam (reserves)
- RTB Ebbw Vale (development)
- Trinant (reserves)
- Wattsville (thirds)

== Promotion and relegation ==
The Premier Division champions (or runners-up if the champions do not meet ground criteria) may be promoted to the Gwent County League.

== Champions - Top division ==
- 1970–71: – Cwmtillery
- 1973–74: – Beaufort Welfare
- 1977–78: – Fields Park Athletic reserves
- 1979–80: – Fields Park Athletic reserves
- 1980–81: – Cwmtillery
- 1983–84: – Abertillery Town
- 1984–85: – Abertillery Town
- 1985–86: – Fields Park Athletic reserves
- 1987–88: – Brynmawr
- 1989–90: – Cwm
- 1993–94: – Cwm Welfare
- 1994–95: – Blaina West Side
- 1996–97: – Hafodyrynys Bluebirds
- 1997–98: – Central Cars
- 1999–2000: – Abertillery Bluebirds
- 2000–01: –
- 2001–02: – Fochriw Sports
- 2002–03: – Rhymney
- 2003–04: – Aberbargoed Town
- 2004–05: – Tredegar
- 2005–06: – Castle United
- 2006–07: – Abertillery Bluebirds reserves
- 2007–08: – Fleur-De-Lys Welfare
- 2008–09: – Fleur-De-Lys Welfare
- 2009–10: – Rhymney
- 2010–11: – Tredegar Athletic
- 2011–12: – Neuadd Wen
- 2012–13: – Cwm
- 2013–14: – The Oak
- 2014–15: – Wattsville
- 2015–16: – Brynmawr
- 2016–17: – The Oak
- 2017–18: – Aberbargoed Town
- 2018–19: – Aberbargoed Town
- 2019–20: – Llanhilleth Athletic
- 2020–21: – No competition
- 2021–22: – Neuadd Wen
- 2022–23: – Newbridge Town
- 2023–24: – Brynmawr United
- 2024–25: – Fleur-De-Lys
- 2025–26: – Newbridge Town
