= Ogilvie Village Halt railway station =

Disused railway station in Deri, Caerphilly

Coordinates: 51.7148°N 3.2677°W

Ogilvie Village Halt

General information
- Location: Deri, Caerphilly; Wales

Other information
- Status: Disused

History
- Post-grouping: Great Western Railway

Key dates
- 16 May 1935: Opened
- 31 December 1962: Closed
Location

Ogilvie Village Halt railway station served the village of Deri, Caerphilly, Wales on the Brecon and Merthyr Tydfil Junction Railway. The site of the halt does not appear on os maps but was likely in private ownership. Nothing remains of the halt.

Preceding station	Disused railways	Following station
Fochriw; Line and station closed	Great Western Railway; Brecon and Merthyr Tydfil Junction Railway	Darran and Deri; Line and station closed
