= Grade I listed buildings in Caerphilly County Borough =

Caerphilly County Borough shown within Wales

In the United Kingdom, the term listed building refers to a building or other structure officially designated as being of special architectural, historical, or cultural significance; Grade I structures are those considered to be "buildings of exceptional interest". Listing was begun by a provision in the Town and Country Planning Act 1947. Once listed, strict limitations are imposed on the modifications allowed to a building's structure or fittings. In Wales, the authority for listing under the Planning (Listed Buildings and Conservation Areas) Act 1990 rests with Cadw.

== Buildings ==
Name	Location Grid Ref. (Note: Sometimes known as OSGB36, the grid reference is based on the British national grid reference system used by the Ordnance Survey.) Geo-coordinates	Date Listed	Function	Notes	Reference Number	Image
Caerphilly Castle	Caerphilly; ST1552687066; 51°34′34″N 3°13′13″W	28 January 1963	Castle	On a low-lying marshy site surrounded by hills to the N, S and W. Two streams, the Nant Gledyr and Nant yr Aber, cross the area and drain into the R Rhymney which flows towards the E. These streams were dammed to make the moat and great lakes.	13539	See more images
Llancaiach Fawr	Gelligaer; ST1136096620; 51°39′41″N 3°16′59″W	25 October 1951	House	Close to the W community boundary which follows Nant Caeach, a short distance NE of Nelson and reached by a short track from the main road. Fronts a re-created formal garden, the surrounding walls incorporating stone benches.	13562	See more images

== See also ==
- Listed buildings in Wales
- Grade II* listed buildings in Caerphilly County Borough
- Scheduled Monuments in Caerphilly
- Registered historic parks and gardens in Caerphilly County Borough
