= Groesfaen Colliery Platform railway station =

Disused railway station in Bargoed, Caerphilly

Coordinates: 51.6955°N 3.2491°W

Groesfaen Colliery Platform

General information
- Location: Bargoed, Caerphilly; Wales
- Platforms: 1

Other information
- Status: Disused

History
- Post-grouping: Great Western Railway

Key dates
- 1926: Opened
- 31 December 1962: Closed
Location

Groesfaen Colliery Platform railway station served the workers at Groesfaen Colliery near the town of Bargoed, Caerphilly, Wales on the Brecon and Merthyr Tydfil Junction Railway. The site of the platform does not appear on OS maps and the station was only for workers at the nearby colliery. Nothing remains of the platform or colliery and the station site has since been reused by the A469.

The station was considered for closure before formulation of the Beeching cuts report The Reshaping of British Railways, and was closed before the publication of that report in March 1963.

Preceding station	Disused railways	Following station
Darran and Deri; Line and station closed	Great Western Railway	Bargoed; Line closed, station open
