= Nine Mile Point Colliery =

Welsh coal mine

Coordinates: 51°36′53″N 3°10′06″W

Nine Mile Point colliery was a coal mine at Cwmfelinfach in the South Wales Valleys, originally known as "Coronation Colliery", and constructed between 1902 and 1905. The deepest shaft was 1,176 feet deep. Seven men were killed on 13 August 1904 during the establishment of the mine.

It was renamed Nine Mile Point as that was the distance of the tramroad from the edge of Lord Tredegar's boundary in Newport to the colliery.

At its peak it employed 2,105 men, who lived mainly in the surrounding villages of Wattsville and Cwmfelinfach. In 1935, 164 men "stayed down" in a "sit in" protest, the first ever in the South Wales coalfield, over the use of scab labour.

In 1929 riots broke out at the colliery. The reasons for the riot were to be found in the employment of blackleg labour, with more than 700 villagers and miners rioting at the time, taking several days for police to disperse and maintain control.

The colliery closed in 1964.
