= Mynyddislwyn =

Former civil parish in Monmouthshire, Wales

- Area
  - 1911: 5,152 acres (20.85 km^{2})
  - 1961: 5,415 acres (21.91 km^{2})
- Population
  - 1911: 9,980
  - 1971: 15,464
- History
  - Created: 1903
  - Abolished: 1974
  - Succeeded by: Islwyn
- Status: Urban district
  - HQ: Pontllanfraith

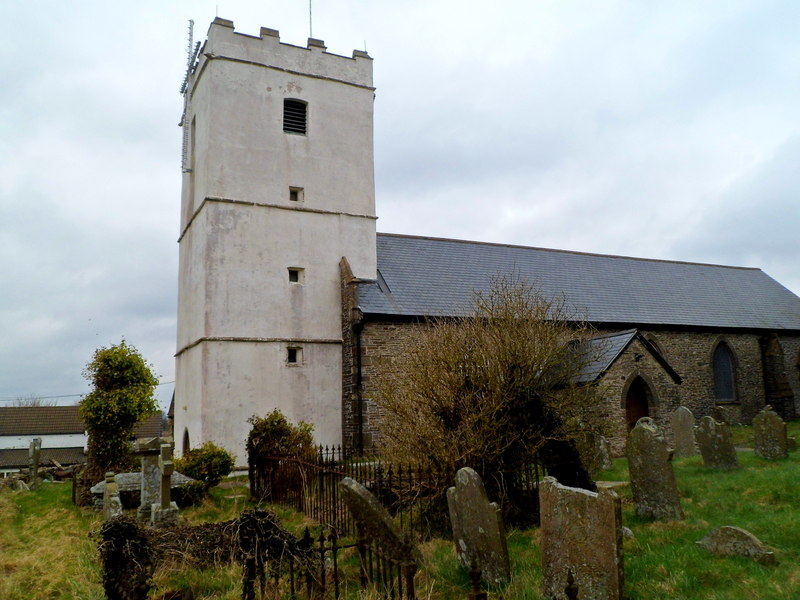
South side of St Tudor's Church, Mynyddislwyn

Mynyddislwyn was a civil parish and urban district in the historic county of Monmouthshire, South East Wales. It was abolished in the local government reorganisation of 1974. It is named for the hill or common at its centre, “Mynydd Islwyn”. The Welsh-language poet William Thomas (1832–1878) took his bardic name of “Islwyn” from the place “Mynydd Islwyn”, after which “Islwyn” became a common boy's name in Wales.

The ancient parish of Mynyddislwyn covered a large part of the lower Ebbw and Sirhowy Valleys. In 1894 the Crosskeys area was included in the urban district of Risca, and Abercarn was constituted a separate urban district. The remainder of the parish was included in St Mellons Rural District, and included the hamlets of Fleur-de-Lis, Gelligroes, Penmain, Pontllanfraith and Ynysddu.

On 1 October 1903 Mynyddislwyn became an urban district. In 1926 it formed the “West Monmouthshire Omnibus Board” with neighbouring Bedwellty urban district, to maintain local ownership of local bus services. In 1935 the boundaries were adjusted with Bedwas and Machen and Bedwellty urban districts under a County Review Order.

“Mynyddislwyn Urban District” was abolished in 1974, with its area passing to the borough of Islwyn, in the newly created administrative county of Gwent. Further local government reform in 1996 included the area in the county borough of Caerphilly.

St Tudor's church is part of the Benefice of Upper Islwyn, and has services on the first Sunday of every month.
