= Ricky Valance =

Welsh singer (1936–2020)

- Birth name: David Spencer
- Born: 10 April 1936 Ynysddu, Monmouthshire, Wales
- Died: 12 June 2020 (aged 84) Skegness, Lincolnshire, England
- Genres: Pop, Doo-wop, Rock and Roll
- Occupation: Singer
- Years active: 1958–2020
- Labels: Columbia, Decca, Crystal, One Media iP

David Spencer (10 April 1936 – 12 June 2020), known professionally as Ricky Valance, was a Welsh pop singer. He was best known for the UK number one single "Tell Laura I Love Her", which sold more than a million copies in 1960. He was the first male Welsh singer to have a UK number one single hit.

== Early life ==
Born as David Spencer in Ynysddu, Monmouthshire, Wales, the eldest of seven children, he sang in his church choir and worked in a coal mine and a factory before joining the RAF at the age of 17.

== Music career ==
He started his musical career after leaving the armed forces. He performed in local clubs in the north of England as a cabaret singer for a couple of years, before he was discovered by an A&R representative from EMI, signed to EMI's Columbia label, and placed with the record producer Norrie Paramor.

He claimed he selected the stage name Ricky Valance because he liked the name Ricky, and took the name Valance from that of a trainer at a horse racing meeting; it was not a tribute to Ritchie Valens as sometimes reported.

At his first recording session, Paramor suggested that Valance cover Ray Peterson's American hit, "Tell Laura I Love Her", co-written by Jeff Barry. The recording was arranged by Frank Barber. Peterson's original version of the song had never been released in the United Kingdom, as Decca Records considered a rock song about death and tragedy to be in bad taste. The BBC refused to play teenage tragedy songs like "Tell Laura I Love Her", but, thanks to airplay on Radio Luxembourg, Valance was rewarded with a number 1 hit in September 1960. Valance thus became the first Welsh man to reach the top spot – Shirley Bassey being the first Welsh female with "As I Love You" in February 1959. The record was his only chart hit in the UK.

After topping the UK Singles Chart, Valance appeared in the 1961 A Song For Europe competition, hoping to represent the UK in the upcoming Eurovision Song Contest. His song, "Why Can't We?", placed third out of the nine entries; the winner was "Are You Sure?" performed by the Allisons.

Further singles included "Movin' Away" and "Jimmy's Girl". More than 100,000 copies were sold of "Jimmy's Girl", and "Movin' Away" made it to number one in Australia and Scandinavia.

While Valance continued to have some international success, changes in musical taste in the mid 1960s resulted in the ending of his Columbia contract. He sang in Ireland with a showband, the Chessmen, in 1967, and also undertook work as an actor, and performed country music. In later years, he featured in 1960s revival festivals in Britain, and on cruise ships. In 1989, he visited Nashville where he appeared on the show Nashville Now, and he returned there in 2001 to record an album, One of the Best. Later, he continued to perform, when living in Spain, and hosted a local golf-based chat show on television, Play a Round with Ricky.

In 2015, he was given an award at the Wales Millennium Centre, as the first Welsh man to have a UK number one hit. He released a single, "Welcome Home", in 2017, to raise funds for the Royal Air Force Museum.

== Personal life and death ==
Valance lived in Cabo Roig on the outskirts of Torrevieja on the Costa Blanca in Spain, where he performed regularly. In 2015 he and his wife moved to Skegness, Lincolnshire.

He died in Skegness on 12 June 2020. He was 84, and had been hospitalised for dementia in the months leading up to his death. His funeral was held at St. Mary's Church in Goldington, Bedfordshire on 13 July 2020.

== UK singles ==
=== Columbia ===
- DB4493 – "Tell Laura I Love Her" / "Once Upon a Time" (1960)
- DB4543 – "Movin' Away" / "Lipstick on Your Lips" (1960)
- DB4586 – "Jimmy's Girl" / "Only the Young" (1961)
- DB4592 – "Why Can't We" / "Fisherboy" (1961)
- DB4680 – "Bobby" / "I Want to Fall in Love" (1961)
- DB4725 – "I Never Had a Chance" / "It's Not True" (1961)
- DB4787 – "Try to Forget Her" / "At Times Like These" (1962)
- DB4864 – "Don't Play No.9" / "Till the Final Curtain Falls" (1962)

=== Decca ===
- F12129 – "Six Boys" / "A Face in the Crowd" (1965)

=== Crystal ===
- CR7004 – "Abigail" / "My Summer Love" (1969) (as Jason Merryweather)

=== Tank ===
- BSS313 – "Hello Mary Lou" / "Walking in the Sunshine" (1978)

=== Umbrella ===
- UMO111 – "Daddy's Little Girl" / "Ticket to Dream" (1988)

=== One Media iP ===
- "Welcome Home" / "Tell Laura I Love Her" (55th Anniversary Edition) (2016)

== See also ==
- List of artists who reached number one on the UK Singles Chart
- List of Eurovision: Your Decision contestants
