= Osi Rhys Osmond =

Welsh painter (1942–2015)

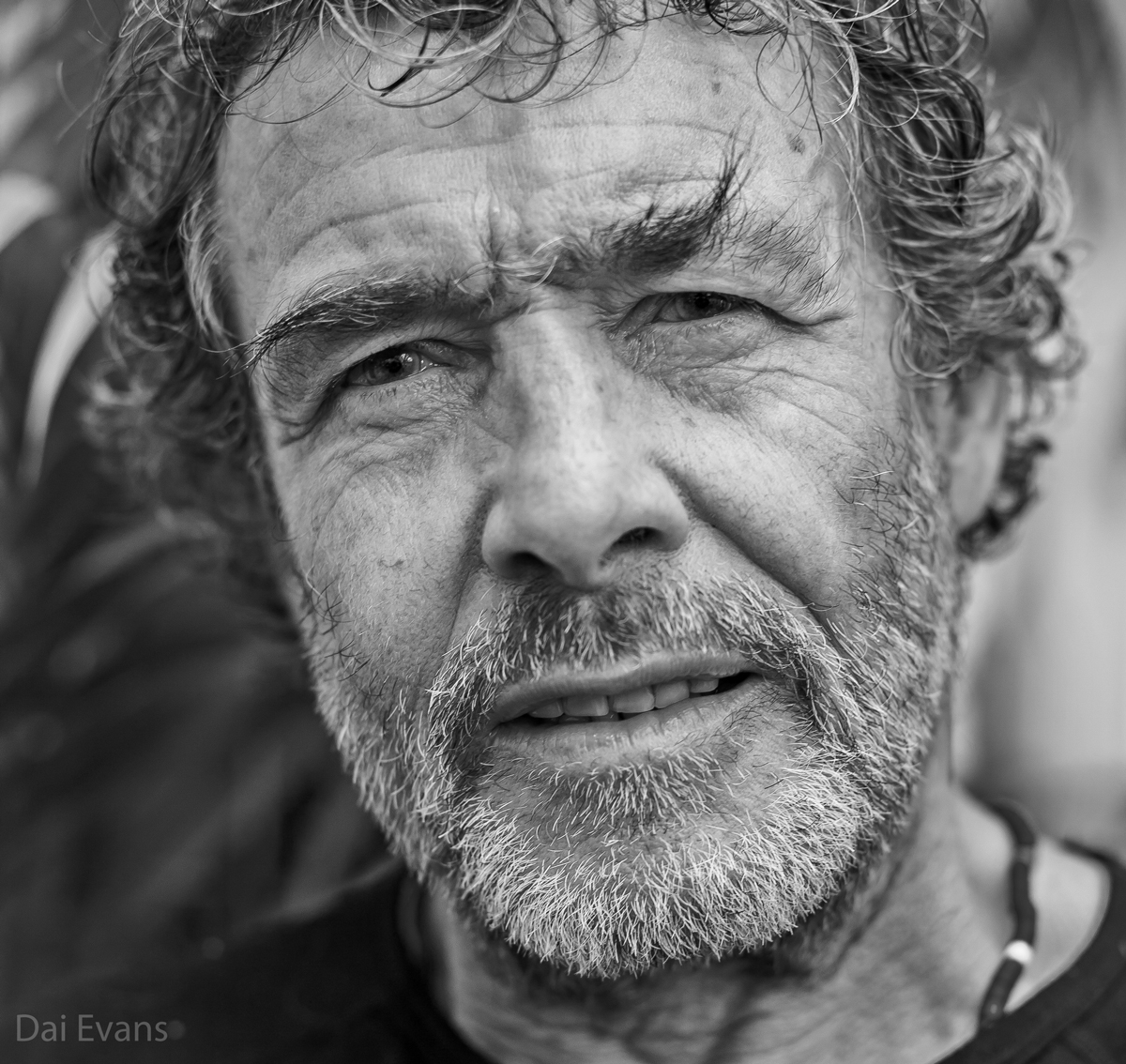
Osi Rhys Osmond

Osi Rhys Osmond (born Donald Malcolm Osmond; 28 June 1942 – 6 March 2015) was a Welsh painter and an occasional television and radio presenter.

== Biography ==
Osmond was born in Bristol to Welsh parents from Wattsville, Sirhowy, Caerphilly, where his family were miners. Air raids during the Second World War caused his family to move back to Wales when he was an infant. He later adopted the name Rhys from his second wife, Hilary Rhys, great granddaughter of the musician John Thomas Rees.

He was educated in Newport Art College and Cardiff Art College. He was fascinated with colour throughout his career. "Colour is the basis of my craft – I talk through colour, I speak through colour, I use colour to express myself and convey my ideas", he told the Western Mail in 2009.

In 2006, Osmond presented the Welsh-language television series, Byd o Liw, on S4C. He also presented features on BBC Radio 3. In March 2012, Osmond was profiled on BBC 2's The Culture Show. In June 2012 Osmond was co-presenter and mentor on the BBC Wales television series, The Exhibitionists, where participants compete to become art experts. He wrote on the visual representation of South Wales in periodicals such as Planet, New Welsh Review, Tu Chwith and Barn and Golwg. In 2006 he published Carboniferous Collisions, on the painter Josef Herman.

In April 2012 Osmond returned to the area of his youth to hold an exhibition of his paintings, in tribute to his family and the local community. Osmond lived in Llansteffan, Carmarthenshire for 30 years. He became a member of the Gorsedd at the National Eisteddfod in Swansea in 2006, and was made an honorary fellow of the University of Wales, Trinity Saint David in July 2013. He was a lecturer at Swansea Metropolitan University and a member of the Arts Council of Wales.

== Death ==
Osmond died on 6 March 2015, aged 71, of cancer in Llansteffan, Carmarthenshire. At the time of his death he was completing a final painting, with the process recorded in a documentary. The painting was due to go on display in 2017 in Cardiff's new Maggie's centre at the Velindre Cancer Centre.
