= Fochriw =

Coordinates: 51.7402°N 3.2985°W

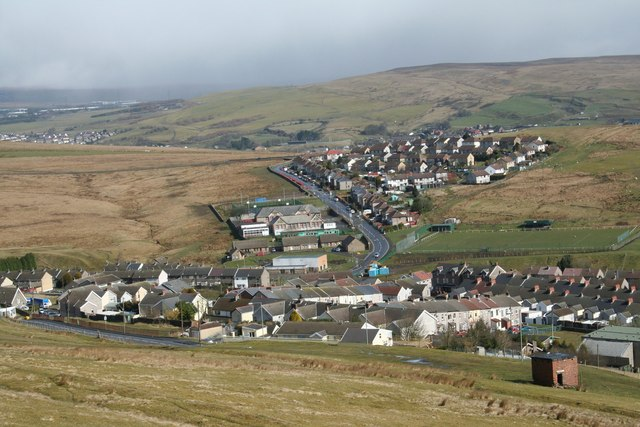

- Location within Caerphilly
- Population: 1,250 (2011)
- OS grid reference: SO107058
- Community: Darran Valley
- Principal area: Caerphilly
- Preserved county: Gwent
- Country: Wales
- Sovereign state: United Kingdom
- Post town: BARGOED
- Postcode district: CF81
- Dialling code: 01685
- Police: Gwent
- Fire: South Wales
- Ambulance: Welsh
- UK Parliament: Blaenau Gwent and Rhymney
- Senedd Cymru – Welsh Parliament: Merthyr Tydfil and Rhymney

Fochriw (Welsh pronunciation: [vɔxˈrɪu̯]) is a village in Caerphilly County Borough, Wales. It was well known for its neighbouring collieries, which employed nearly the entire local population in the early 20th century. It lies within the historic county boundaries of Glamorgan. The village appears as the backdrop on the BBC Wales sitcom High Hopes credits. The village's population was 1,250 in 2011.

== History ==
Fochriw's growth was germinated to a lesser extent by the Rhymney Iron Company’s demand for ironstone, and to a greater extent by the Dowlais Ironworks’ need for high-quality coal. The coal was of such good quality that it could be directly used in the iron-making process without the need for conversion to coke.

Over a period of about 130 years, the landscape changed from rural to industrial and then back to rural, as it is today. However, the latter changes did not take place until relatively recently when nearly all the remnants of the coal mining industry were removed from around the village.

== Location ==
Fochriw is a typical South Wales Valleys coal mining village that developed from its rural existence by the need for iron and coal during the 19th century. It is located on the north-east flank of Mynydd Fochriw at the head of the Bargoed Fach (now called the Darran) valley, approximately 5 miles (8.0 km) north of Bargoed, and 5 miles (8.0 km) south east of Merthyr Tydfil. The village straddles two ancient hamlets in the parish of Gelligaer, these being the Ysgwyddgwyn and Brithdir hamlets, the dividing line being the brook (Bargoed Fach) which flows in the bottom of the valley. The boundaries of these hamlets were walked by a number of parishioners of the parish on 24th day of May, 1750, and a document detailing the boundaries of each hamlet, namely Keven, Hengode, Garthgynyd, Ysgwyddgwyn, and Brithdecr (Brithdir) was produced, extracts of same are reproduced below.

Ysgwyddgwyn Hamlet It begins where Nant Goch goes to Bargoed by Pont Cradoc then along Nant Goch upwards to the stone standing on the Common opposite Mardy Bach house then from that stone directly westward along the old ditch to the Highway that leadeth from Pen yr Hrwl Ddu to Pen y Bryn Oie then along the way to Trosater Henla then to Three Great Stones standing in the Heath below Twyn y Wayn between Merthyr and Gellygaer then directly eastward to Bargoed River little below the way that leadeth from Keven y Brith

Brithdecr (Brithdir) Hamlet It begins where Bargoed River goes to Rhymney by Aberbargoed Bridge then along the River Bargoed upwards till it comes very near the way upon the Common that leadeth from Keven y Brith decr to Twyn y Wayn then directly eastwards to the three stones in the Heath below Twyn y Wayn between Merthyr and Gellygaer then directly to the E sid Twyn y Wayn then directly to Fynnon Gwellin then to the old water pond in Pantywayn Coal pits then directly to the spring head of a Brook called Nant y Glynon then to Pwll Elwch Uarc then to Carn y Clyndir or Mark Ycha then to Carn Helig then to Rhyd y Milwr on the River Rhymney then along the River Rhymney to Aberbargoed Bridge aforesaid.

The foregoing boundaries were perambulated the 24th day of May 1750 by George Parry Curate of Gellygaer, William Perrott Churchwarden, Edmond LLewelyn of Garthgynyd, George Williams of Carno, Henry Thomas of Brithdee, Thomas Lewis of Keven Bach, David Evans of Blaen Rhymney, Moses David of Pitwellt, Lewis Edwards of Ysgwyddgwyn and several others of the Parishioners of the said parish.

== Origin of the name ==
It was identified as Brohru Carn in the 12th century, and a reference to Fforch y Rhiw is made in the book Parish of Gelligaer by T.V. Davies, in the section dealing with Roman History and the route of Heol Adam. It states that “The holding called Fforch y Rhiw is mentioned in several Gelligaer leases of the 17th century. The name probably arises from a number of old tracks in the Brithdir Hamlet which tend to converge near Fochriw”.

It has also been known as Boch Rhiw Carn, Ffochreiw, Fochrhiw, Vochriw, Vochrhiw, and, currently, Fochriw. The interpretation of the name from an my original Fochriw family was Foch Y Rhiw Pentwyn Mawr which translates in English to : the cheek of the slope of the head hill (Pentwyn Mountain). This seems to describe the village's actual location.

== In ancient times ==
By 75 AD the Romans had reached the flat plain where, within a mile or so of each other, the three rivers, Rhymney, Taff and Ely reach the sea, and had built there a wooden fort. Later this was rebuilt in stone and its remains can still be seen in patches at the base of the walls of Cardiff Castle. This was the principal centre of occupation of what was the old county of Glamorgan.

Leaving at Cardiff a permanent garrison, the Romans pushed west and north. A Roman road was made to Gelligaer as a connecting link between the forts of Cardiff and Brecon. In addition to a fort at Gelligaer another was eventually built at Penydarren. Thence the road ran through Pontsarn and Vaynor to Y Gaer, near Brecon. On an Ordnance Survey map one can trace the line of the Roman road on Gelligaer common, where it is known as Heol Adam. The Roman road from the fort at Gelligaer lies just west of Fochriw and Pant-y-Waun.

It is said that the Romans marched 11 Roman miles a day and there was a rest post at Twyn-y-Waun which was 11 miles from the fort at Gelligaer. A Roman fort also exists at Pen-y-Darren which is located underneath the current site of Merthyr Town F.C.

== Industrial era ==
Fochriw existed to provide accommodation for miners at the Fochriw Colliery, later for the Ogilvie Colliery to the South. By the end of the 19th century there were a few houses on Brook Road, still the main road through the village, and three terraced streets to the west of Railway Terrace. The streets are still marked on maps and traces of the roads remain, although all buildings have been cleared and they are now a bare field. At this time there were two chapels: baptist and Carmel, a school and a station.

By 1919 the village had grown and the terraces to the south around Aelbryn and Glyn Terrace had been built. A church and two larger schools had also appeared.

=== Fochriw Colliery ===
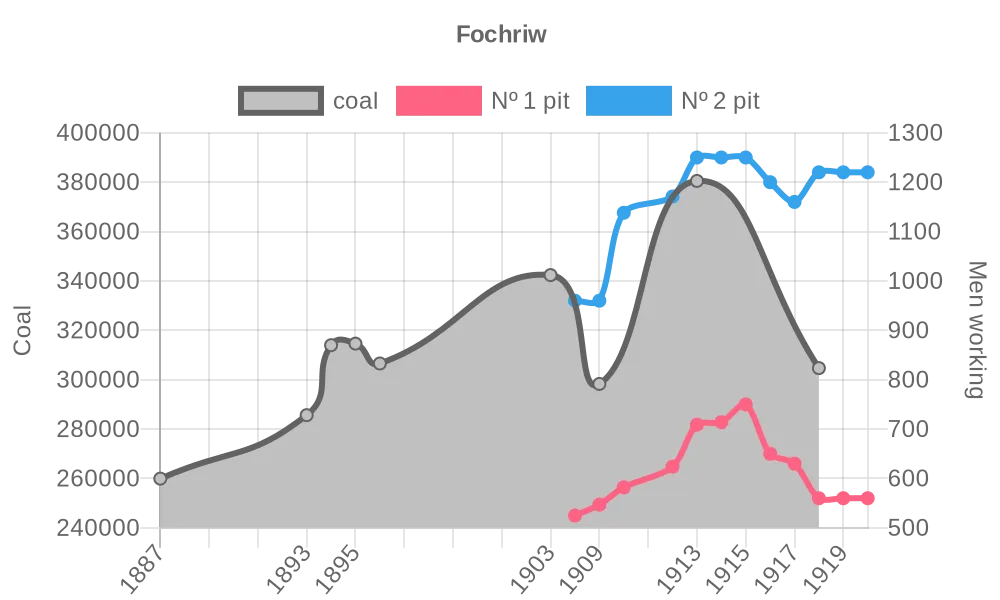
Production and men working

Fochriw Colliery was sunk by the Dowlais Iron Co. to provide coal for their blast furnaces at Dowlais. Sinking began in 1857 and by 1866 two shafts were producing coal. In 1910 the No. 1 pit was producing 1,900 tons weekly from the Upper Two Feet Nine and the Upper Four Feet seams, with the No. 2 pit producing 3,900 tons from the Big Coal, Red Coal and Rhas Las seams. It closed in 1924.

Fochriw Colliery		1887	-	1893	1894	1895	1896	-	1903	-	1908	1909	1910	-	1912	1913	1914	1915	1916	1917	1918	1919	1920
Coal (tons)		259,926		285,640	313,974	314,614	306,573		342,372			298,283				380,500					304,690		
Men employed	No 1 pit										525	547	582		624	709	714	750	650	630	560	560	560
Men employed	No 2 pit										960	960	1,138		1,171	1,250	1,250	1,250	1,200	1,160	1,220	1,220	1,220

=== Railway ===
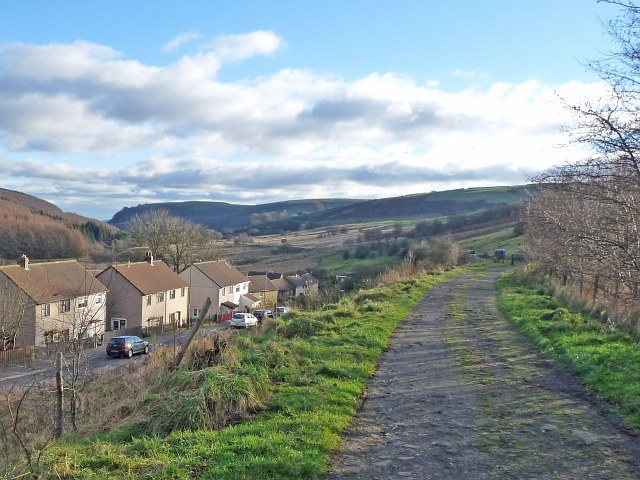
Looking south down the Darran valley, along the track of the disused railway line

Fochriw was on the Brecon and Merthyr Railway line from Bargoed to Dowlais Top. The Bargoed branch of the Rhymney Railway ran north from Bargoed to Deri Junction, then the B&M constructed the line from Deri northwards, through Fochriw. Each company had running rights, with the Rhymney running as far north as Fochriw Colliery, past a number of other collieries in the Darran valley. The Rhymney section to Deri was opened in 1864, but the B&M did not open through Fochriw to Dowlais Top until 1 September 1867, as they had been legally obliged to complete their connection from Dowlais to Merthyr first. The line through Fochriw may have been completed some years before this, and coal shipped northwards from the colliery, but the line was not yet officially opened for passenger service. Increasing coal traffic southwards from Cilhaul and Ogilvie collieries after 1900 led to the Rhymney section being relaid as double track. The Ogilvie Colliery at Deri was sunk between 1918 and 1923.

The climb from Deri Junction to Fochriw was steep, three miles of 1:40, a shallow gradient through the station, and then a further climb for a mile of 1:38. The highest point of the line, and the highest railway in South Wales, was in the cutting before Pant-y-waun, adjacent to the still-extant reservoir of Rhaslas Pond. At 1314 feet, this was a single foot higher than Torpantau summit in the Brecon Beacons.

By 1919, there was also a connection from Fochriw Colliery through to Cwm Bargoed, west of the village.

Fochriw railway station was built to the north of Brook Row, on top of the embankment which can still be seen on the east of Railway Terrace. Southwards its path can still be seen as a footpath between Aelbryn and Plantation Terrace. As well as the platform, there was also a small goods shed. The siding and goods shed were removed in 1959 and the railway closed to passengers on the 29 December 1962. (Note: This closure pre-dated the Beeching Axe and was one of those put forward under the 1949 Branch Lines Committee plans.)

Preceding station	Disused railways	Following station
Pantywaun Halt; Line and station closed	Brecon and Merthyr Tydfil Junction Railway; Northern section	Ogilvie Village Halt; Line and station closed

== Education ==
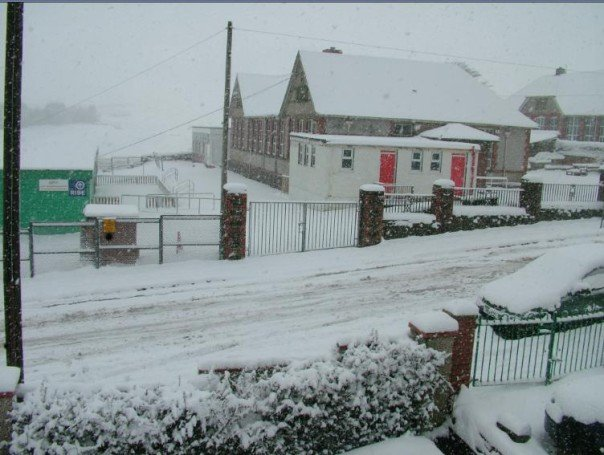
Fochriw Primary School

The first school in the area was a National School at Pentwyn. It was opened in 1856 by the Gellygaer Charities which were left to the parish by Edward Lewis of Gilfach Bargoed in 1715.

The new infant school was opened in July 1910 and was attended for instruction by the scholars for the first time on the first Monday of September 1910. In April 1911 a half acre of land adjacent to the existing school was bought for £20. It was not until September 1912 that a letter was written to the building committee of the County Council recommending that a new school be built.

On 1 April 1971 both Infants and Junior schools combined under one Head Teacher to become Fochriw Primary School. A Nursery was opened at Plantation Terrace in 1973.

== See also ==
- Rhymney Valley

== Bibliography ==
- Coggan, Ifor (2012). A History of Coal Mining in the Darran Valley.
- Evans, Marion (1994). A Portrait of Rhymney with cameos of Pontlottyn, Tafarnaubach, Princetown, Abertysswg and Fochriw. Vol. 1. Old Bakehouse Publications. ISBN 1-874538-40-9.
- — (1995). A Portrait of Rhymney with cameos of Pontlottyn, Tafarnaubach, Princetown, Abertysswg and Fochriw. Vol. 2. Old Bakehouse Publications. ISBN 1-874538-70-0.
- — (1996). A Portrait of Rhymney with cameos of Pontlottyn, Tafarnaubach, Princetown, Abertysswg and Fochriw. Vol. 3. Old Bakehouse Publications. ISBN 1-874538-41-7.
- — (1998). A Portrait of Rhymney with cameos of Pontlottyn, Tafarnaubach, Princetown, Abertysswg and Fochriw. Vol. 4. Old Bakehouse Publications. ISBN 1-874538-02-6.
- — (2009). A Portrait of Rhymney with cameos of Pontlottyn, Tafarnaubach, Princetown, Abertysswg and Fochriw. Vol. 5. Old Bakehouse Publications. ISBN 978-1-905967-20-9.
- Owen, John A. (1978). "Merthy Tydfil Industrial Development 1870–1918". Merthyr Historian. Vol. 2. Merthyr Tydfil Historical Society. pp. 41–42. ISBN 0-9504845-1-2.
- Page, James (1989). Rails in The Valleys. David & Charles. ISBN 0-7153-8979-3.
- Price, Peter (1996). A History of Fochriw in Photographs with Pentwyn and Pantywaun. Vol. 1. Old Bakehouse Publications. ISBN 1-874538-11-5.
- — (1997). A History of Fochriw in Photographs with Pentwyn and Pantywaun. Vol. 2. Old Bakehouse Publications. ISBN 1-874538-56-5.
- Price, Peter; Coggan, Ifor (2011). A History of the Darran Valley in Photographs. Vol. 1.
