= Ynysddu =

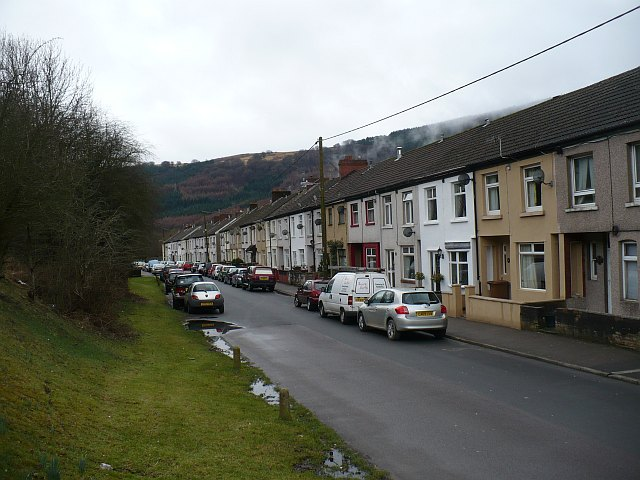
- Graig View

- Location within Caerphilly
- Population: 3,948 (2011)
- OS grid reference: ST180925
- Principal area: Caerphilly
- Preserved county: Gwent
- Country: Wales
- Sovereign state: United Kingdom
- Post town: NEWPORT
- Postcode district: NP11
- Post town: BLACKWOOD
- Postcode district: NP12
- Dialling code: 01495
- Police: Gwent
- Fire: South Wales
- Ambulance: Welsh
- UK Parliament: Islwyn
- Senedd Cymru – Welsh Parliament: Islwyn
- List of places UK Wales Caerphilly 51.6267°N 3.1861°W Map of the community

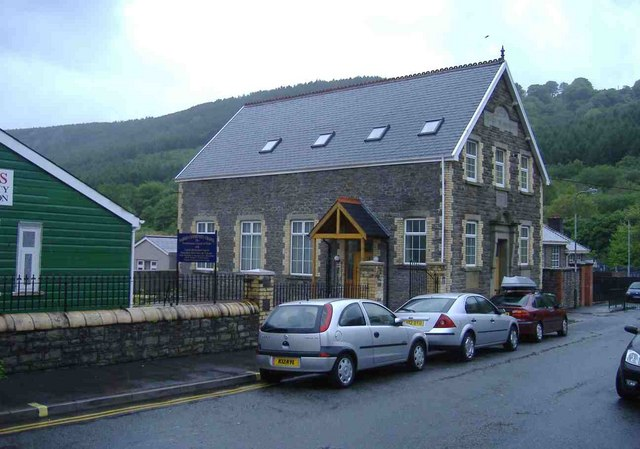
Sardis Community Chapel

Ynysddu is a small village, community and electoral ward in the Sirhowy valley of south-east Wales. It is part of the district of Caerphilly within the historic boundaries of Monmouthshire. It lies between to Cwmfelinfach and Wyllie, 4.3 miles (6.9 km) north of the town of Risca and 4 miles (6.4 km) south of the market town of Blackwood. It is about 10 minutes by road from the M4 motorway and 20 minutes from the Second Severn Crossing. The population in 2008 was 2,905, increasing to 3,948 at the 2011 Census.

The community includes the settlements of Cwmfelinfach, Wyllie and Wattsville.

== History ==
Ynysddu was founded in the early 19th century by the enlightened local colliery owner John Hodder Moggridge, who lived at nearby Woodfield Park. It got its name from Ynsyddu Farm, which was built by Moggridge in 1804. Ynysddu comes from the Welsh descriptive words 'Ynys' ('island' or 'river meadow') and 'ddu' ('black'). 'Black river meadow' is appropriate for the landscape of the area.

After he became alarmed at the terrible living conditions of the poor in the 1820s Moggridge also built 'The Ranks'. Founded as a social experiment 'The Ranks', like similar properties in Blackwood, allowed a few workers to lease a plot of land to build a cottage and garden allotment. 'The Ranks' were situated near the Black Prince pub, but have long since disappeared.

In 1901 Kelly's Directory of Monmouthshire said:

"YNYSDDU is a hamlet of this parish, having a station on the Sirhowy section, London and North Western railway, 10¼ miles north-west from Newport. Here are Baptist and Calvinistic and Primitive Methodist chapels.

Post Office.—John Hughes, sub-postmaster. Letters received through Newport at 8.55 a.m.; dispatched, 6.30 p.m. weekdays only. Postal orders are issued here, but not paid. Pontllanfraith is the nearest money order & Blackwood the nearest telegraph office Board School, erected in 1877, at a cost of £1,500, & erected in 1899, for 167 children; average attendance, 101; Thomas Harries Phillips, master; Miss Susanna Evans, assistant mistress. Railway Station, James Williams, station master"

== Governance ==
Ynysddu is also an electoral ward, coterminous with the community boundaries, which elects two councillors to Caerphilly County Borough Council.

Since 1999 it has been part of the Caerphilly constituency for elections to the Welsh Senedd. The constituency for elections to the UK Parliament is also called Caerphilly.

== Transport ==
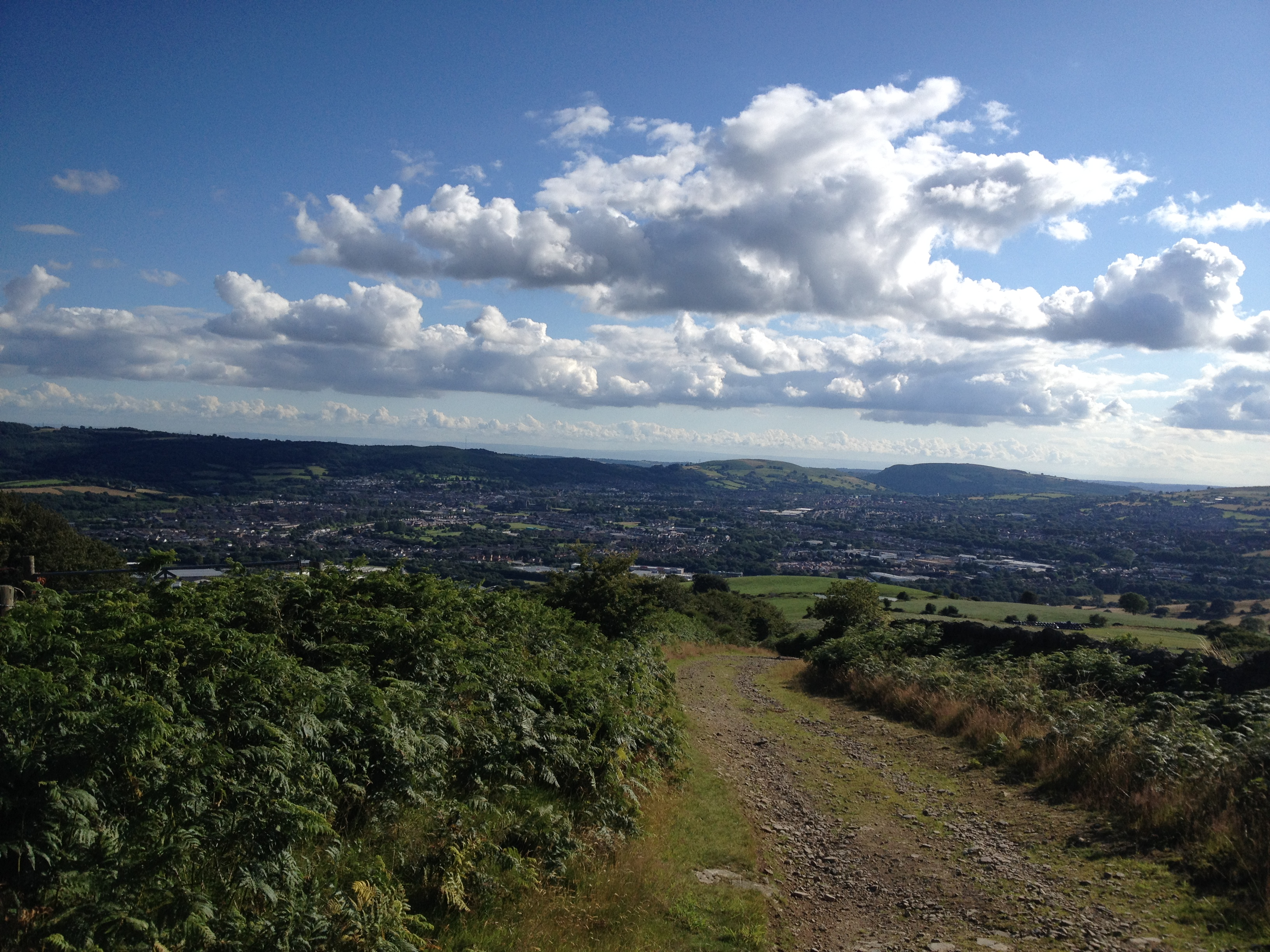
A view of Bedwas and Caerphilly from a side path through Ynys Hywel Activity Centre, which diverts from the main NCN 47 just before Cwmfelinfach.

The village is served by regular buses operated by Stagecoach Group to Tredegar and Blackwood in the north, and Newport city centre in the south.

Ynysddu is also part of the Celtic Trail cycle route (National Cycle Route 47) which connects West Wales from Fishguard through to Carmarthen, Llanelli, Swansea, Merthyr Tydfil, Newport, and the Severn Bridge in the East.

Ynysddu Bus Timetable
Provider	Number	Destination	Journey time	Frequency
Stagecoach Group	56	Tredegar Bus Station	33 minutes	Hourly
Stagecoach Group	56	Blackwood Interchange (Stand 9)	11 minutes	Hourly
Stagecoach Group	56	Newport Bus Station (Market Square)	35 minutes	Hourly

== Notable people ==
See also Category:People from Ynysddu

- Welsh poet William Thomas (1832–1878) was born in Ynysddu, taking his bardic name Islwyn (meaning below the grove) from the parish of Mynyddislwyn, itself named after the mountain which towers over the village. His two best-known poems are both entitled "Yr Ystorm" ("The Storm"); one is a long philosophic poem over 9,000 lines long.
- Singer Ricky Valance (real name David Spencer) was born here.
- Scott Morgan, sports shooter, born 1990; Olympic Trap Shooting (Shotgun)
- Jackie Barnett, who lived in Ynysddu from the age of two, represented Wales at two Commonwealth Games and also played netball for Wales.

== Education ==
Ynysddu Primary School is located in the town; its headmaster as of 2014 was David Witchell.

== Sport and leisure ==
Ynysddu Rugby Club is a member of the Welsh Rugby Union and is a feeder club for the Newport Gwent Dragons. The first Ynysddu game recorded was in 1894 against Abercarn, and was played in the church field at Mynyddislwyn. Ynysddu originally played in an all-black strip, but now play in Black and Red.

Association Football in Ynysddu began in 1905, with the launch of Ynysddu Albion AFC. The club then changed its name to Ynysddu Crusaders AFC in 1915, and existed until the outbreak of WWII in 1939, when it disbanded. The two local wartime clubs, Ynysddu Celtic and Cwmfelinfach Rangers, then merged at the end of WWII in 1945/6 to become Ynysddu Welfare AFC. Following the formal amalgamation of Ynysddu Welfare AFC and Crusaders Seniors AFC in 2008, (the latter having superseded Cwmfelinfach Colts AFC in 2003), the club then became Ynysddu Crusaders FC until the summer of 2013 when the club renamed themselves Ynysddu Welfare FC. They are affiliated to the Gwent County Football Association and are members of the Gwent Premier League (Tier 4 level in the FAW National Pyramid System), with the reserve team playing in the North Gwent Football League. Club Colours are gold and black. They play their home games at the Nine Mile Point Miners' Welfare Ground at Graig View, which they share with Ynysddu RFC.

Nearby is the Sirhowy Valley Country Park. The Ynys Hywel Activity Centre, located there, offers adventure activities such as abseiling, canoeing, mountain biking, rock climbing, orienteering and hill-walking. The Ynysddu Hotel is located in the village.
