= Rhymney A.F.C. =

Football club based in Rhymney

Rhymney
- Full name: Rhymney Association Football Club
- Founded: mid-1960s (reformed)
- Ground: Eisteddfod Field
- League: Gwent County League Division One
- 2024–25: Gwent County League Division One, 14th of 15
Home colours	Away colours

Rhymney A.F.C. is a Welsh football club based in Rhymney, Caerphilly County Borough. They last played in the Gwent County League Division One.

== History ==
In 1902 Rhymney joined the South Wales and Monmouthshire Football Association and the second division of the South Wales League. In 1914 Rhymney planned to join the Welsh Football League. This was successful, and as Rhymney Town they played in the Welsh Football League until 1962.

Rhymney were reformed in the mid-1960s as High Cross FC. They played in the West Gwent League and the Rhymney Valley League. In 1975 they adopted their current name, Rhymney Football Club. In 1977 the West Gwent League folded, so Rhymney moved to the North Gwent Football League. In this league they would go on to win the title in 2002–03 and 2009–10. After their second title they joined the Gwent County League, where they would stay in Division Three for eight seasons before a third place finish was enough to be promoted to Division Two. In 2019 the league was renamed to the Gwent Premier League, and Division Two was renamed to Division One. Rhymney finished 6th in the 2019–20 season, which was ended early due to the COVID-19 pandemic. For the next three seasons after the pandemic (2021–22 to 2023–24) they finished 11th three times in a row. The following season they dropped to 14th and conceded over 100 goals, but remained in Division One for 2025–26. During the 2025–26 season the club withdrew from the league in February 2026.

=== FA Cup ===
Rhymney competed in the FA Cup in two seasons: 1914–15 and 1921–22. In their first ever FA Cup tie they beat Mardy 1–0.

=== Rhymney Brewers ===
Rhymney Brewers was a short-lived club, founded in 2020, and absorbed into Rhymney AFC in 2022.

== Honours ==
- North Gwent Football League - Champions: 2002–03, 2009–10
- Welsh Football League Division Two - Runners-up: 1931–32
