= Fields Park A.F.C. =

Association football club in Wales

Fields Park Football Club
- Founded: 1921
- League: North Gwent Premier Division
- 2025–26: North Gwent Premier Division, (resigned from league)

Fields Park Football Club are a Welsh football club from Newbridge in the county borough of Caerphilly, south Wales. The team reformed in 2014 and plays in the North Gwent Premier Division.

== Club history ==
Originally formed in 1921, the club played in the Tredegar and Ebbw Vale leagues as Fields Park United. In the 1950s the club played in the Abertillery League. This was a period of great success for the club, with six league titles in a 12-year period whilst also reaching 10 cup finals, winning eight of them. In the 1962–63 season the club achieved promotion to the Mon Senior league. In the 1965–66 season, they won the Second Division title to gain promotion to the First Division of the Mon Senior league.

In the 1970–71 season the club was invited to join a new league being set up by the Gwent Football Association called the Gwent Premier League. The club finished runners-up in the inaugural season, 1971–72 and the next ten years saw a period of great success with three league titles and five runners-up spots. The club joined the Gwent County League (an amalgamation of the Gwent Premier League and Mon Senior League) in the Premier Division and were runners-up in the inaugural season of 1980-81 and 1984–85 and champions in 1981–82. The club applied to the Welsh Football League on numerous occasions without success.

In 1992 the club merged with Welsh Football League side Pontllanfraith to form Fields Park Pontllanfraith. This merged club played for 13 seasons in the Welsh Football League until 2005, when the club folded.

In 2014 the team reformed and joined the North Gwent Football League as Fields Park Athletic.

== Honours ==
- Gwent County League Premier Division - Champions (1): 1981–82
- Gwent County League Premier Division - Runners-up (1): 1980–81; 1984–85
- Gwent Premier League - Champions (3): 1973–74; 1978–79; 1979–80
- Gwent Premier League - Runners-up (5): 1971–72; 1974–75; 1975–76; 1977–78; 1980–81
- Mon Senior League Division One - Runners-up (1): 1969–70
- Mon Senior League Division Two - Champions (1): 1962–63
- Abertillery League - Champions (6): 1950–51; 1955–56; 1957–58; 1958–59; 1960–61; 1961–62;
- Tredegar League - Champions (1): 1950–51
- North Gwent League - Champions (3): 1977-78 (reserves); 1979-80 (reserves); 1985-85 (reserves)
- North Gwent League - Runners-up (2): 1972-73 (reserves); 2014–15
- Monmouthshire/Gwent Amateur Cup – Winners: 1969–70, 1978–79
- Gwent Premier League County Motors Cup – Winners: 1981–82, 1984–85
