= Neuadd Wen A.F.C. =

Association football club in Wales

Neuadd Wen Association Football Club
- Nickname: The Farm
- Founded: 2009
- Dissolved: 2024
- Ground: Britannia Playing Field
- 2023–24: Gwent County League Division One
Home colours

Neuadd Wen A.F.C. was a Welsh football club from the town of Aberbargoed in the Welsh county borough of Caerphilly, within the historic boundaries of Monmouthshire, south Wales. Formed in 2009, they played for one season in the Welsh Football League . They last played in the Gwent County League Division One, which is in the fifth tier of the Welsh football pyramid.

== Club history ==
The club was formed in 2009 from a group of players largely playing reserve team football for Welsh Football League club Aberbargoed Buds. The club started in North Gwent Football League hoping to get into the Gwent County League. They were Premier League champions in 2011–12. They moved up the Gwent League pyramid by finishing runners-up in Division Three and Division Two in successive seasons. The following season they completed a successive hat-trick of second places as runners-up in Division One, progressing to the Welsh Football League Division Three. The club remained in the league for just one season, finishing bottom of the league in 16th place by one point. In July 2018 the club folded after relegation from the Welsh Football League.

In September 2019 a reformed version of the club entered the North Gwent Football League Premier Division aiming to climb their way back up through the divisions.

In July 2024, the club announced that they had folded.

== First Team Honours ==
- North Gwent Football League Division One – Champions: 2009–10
- North Gwent Football League Premier Division – Champions: 2011–12; 2021–22
- North Gwent Football League Premier Division – Runners-up: 2010–11
- Gwent County League Division Three – Runners-up: 2014–15
- Gwent County League Division Two – Runners-up: 2015–16; 2022–23
- Gwent County League Division One – Runners-up: 2016–17
- Gwent Senior Cup – Runners-up: 2016–17
- North Gwent Football League Bob Annett Cup – Champions: 2016–17, 2021–22
- North Gwent Football League Roly Parfitt Cup – Champions: 2021–22
- North Gwent Football League Roly Parfitt Cup – Runners-up: 2009–10
- Tom Perkins Cup – Winners: 2011–12
- Tom Perkins Cup – Runners-up: 2010–11

== Reserve Team Honours ==
- North Gwent Football League Reserve Division – Champions: 2017–18, 2022–23

== Welsh Football League history ==
Information in this section is sourced from the Football Club History Database.

Season	League	Final position
2017–18	Welsh Football League Division Three	16th (relegated)
