= William Thomas (Islwyn) =

Welsh poet and clergyman (1832–1878)

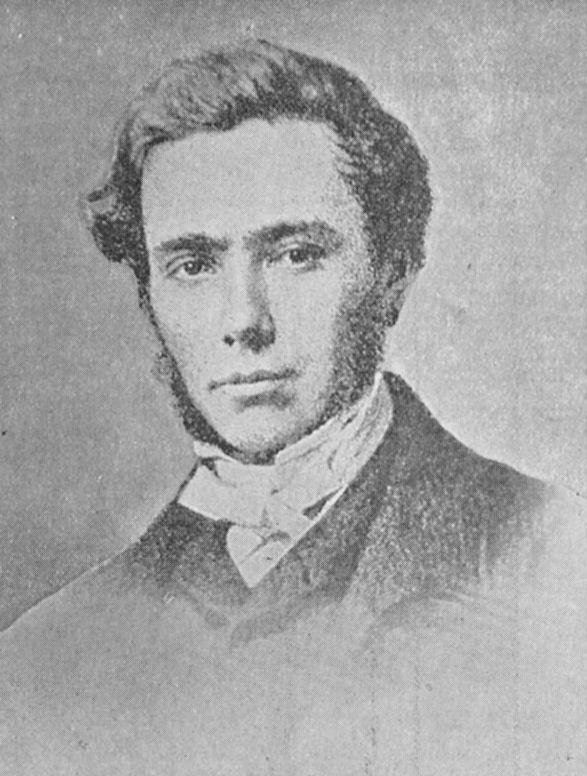
Photographic portrait of Islwyn. The poet was 27 years old when this picture was taken, in 1859.

William Thomas, bardic name Islwyn (3 April 1832 – 20 November 1878), was a Welsh language poet and Christian clergyman. He was born near Ynysddu, in the historic county of Monmouthshire, South East Wales to Morgan Thomas from Ystradgynlais and Mary Jones from Blaengwawr, Aberdare and was the youngest of nine children. His best known poems are entitled Yr Ystorm (The Storm) which he wrote in response to the sudden death of his young fiancée. His poetry was not always greatly regarded in his own lifetime. However, he was respectively called Monmouthshire's main and most important contributor to Welsh literature, the greatest poet of Gwent in the 19th century and the finest Welsh poet of the century.

== Early life ==
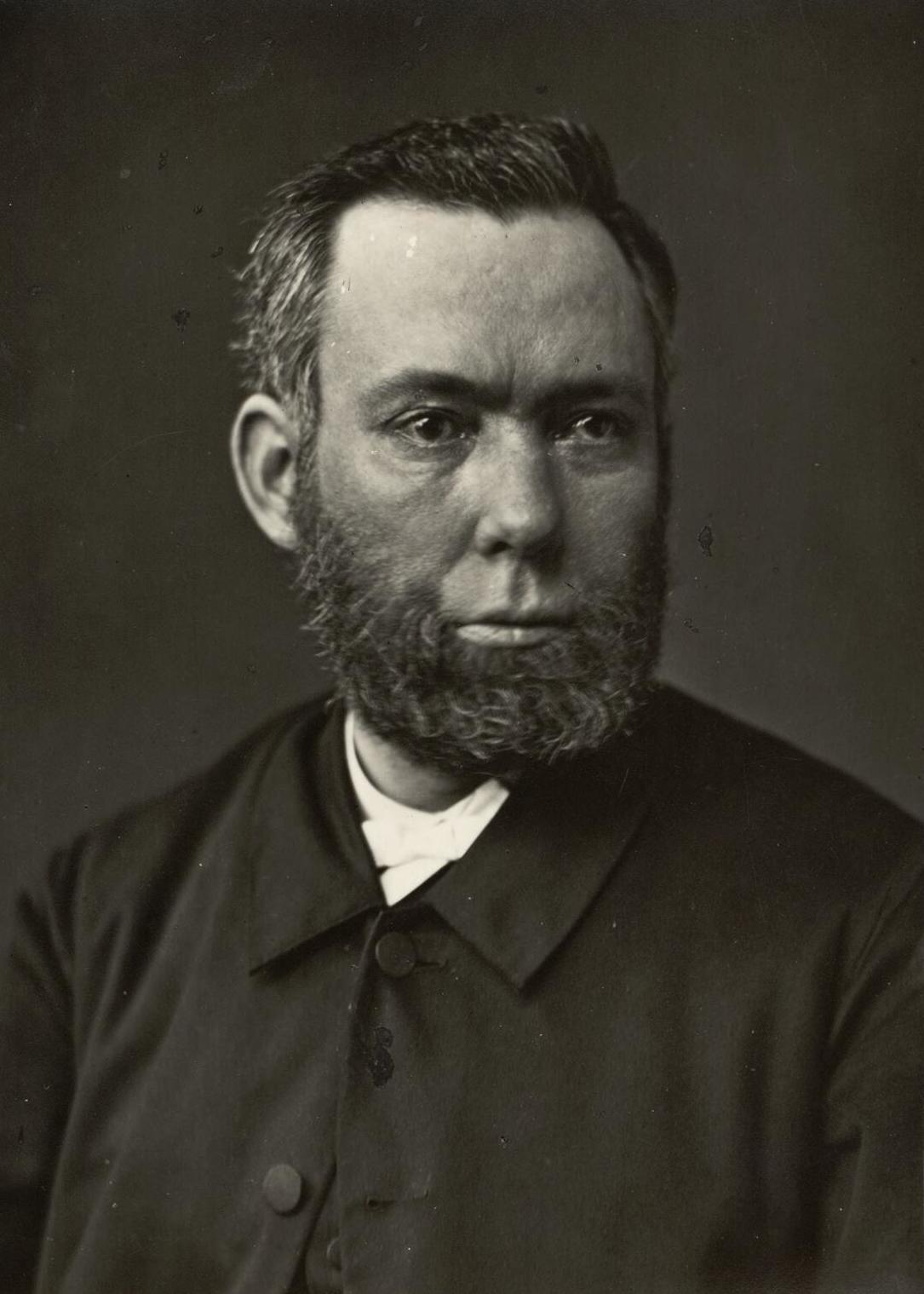
Portrait of William Thomas in the 1870s

Thomas was born in a house called Tŷ'r Agent, the “Agent's House”, in the old parish of Mynyddislwyn near Ynysddu. His father was the mineral agent of the Llanover Estate. He was also probably a Welsh speaker. However, his mother was probably an English-speaker and he was educated entirely in English. Nevertheless, Thomas was fluent in Welsh and he loved the Welsh language, which came from the minister of their local Calvinist Methodist chapel, Rev Daniel Jenkyns, who married his sister Mary and who the young poet greatly admired.

Thomas attended expensive private schools in Newport, Tredegar and Cowbridge, and finally in Swansea, in the Swansea Normal College, a well-known private college which was run by educationalist Evan Davies. Jenkyns encouraged Thomas towards ordination in the church. However, his encouragement annoyed his father, who instead hoped that William would follow his brothers into the financially rewarding career of mining engineering. However, upon the sudden death of his father, which cut short his education, Thomas initially became a land surveyor.

== Later life ==
While Thomas was in Swansea, he became engaged to Ann Bowen. She died in 1853, at the young age of twenty, which became a source of poetic inspiration to him. According to tradition, Lady Llanover suggested he adopt “Islwyn” as his bardic name from Mynyddislwyn, the mountain above his home. (Note: Griffith (1872) documented perhaps the only eye-witness account of Thomas. He saw Thomas from the train in which he was travelling stopped at Abercarn, which he spelt Abercarne, where he saw him on the platform. (Griffith 1872, p. 173).) Subsequently he was a regular winner of local Eisteddfod prizes from the 1850s onwards. In 1853, he won a prize at the Cefn-coed-y-cymmer eisteddfod for his poem Abraham yn aberthu Isaacan and for an elegy to Thomas Price (Carnhuanawc), the Welsh historian, literary figure and polymath, at the Abergavenny Eisteddfod.

Thomas wrote poetry in Welsh and English (Note: Thomas wrote twenty-nine poems in English (Williams & Evans 1913. Reynolds 2005, pp. 143–144).) and produced two books of poems, one of which was published in 1854 and the other of which was published in 1867. His prize-winning poem Ymweliad y Doethion a Bethlehem (The Visit of the Magi to Bethlehem) was published in 1871. His two best-known poems are entitled Y Storm (The Storm), each of which is almost six thousand lines long and which he wrote in response to the sudden death of Anne Bowen. Thomas (1988) observed:

'In some respects they differ from each other, though both reflect his thoughts about life, its trials and tribulations, and about death.'

His poems are noted for their confident expressions of Christian faith, expectation of reunion in heaven, fulfilment of Christian duty and completion of a life fulfilled in God's work. He began preaching in 1854. And he was ordained a Calvinistic Methodist minister in 1859. However, he never took charge of a chapel as was the custom with the Calvinist Methodists at the time. Daniel Jenkyns remained minister of Babell Chapel, Cwmfelinfach. But Thomas was a regular preacher there for more than 20 years while undertaking his ongoing work.

In 1864 Thomas married Martha Davies, Ann Bowen's stepsister. He edited several periodicals, the Welsh column of the Cardiff Times, South Wales Daily News and Gwladgarwr. His poetry was not always greatly regarded in his own lifetime. However, it found favour after his death. Wade and Wade (1909) opined that Thomas 'is generally allowed to have been the finest Welsh poet of the century.' Graves (1917) called him 'the Welsh Wordsworth'. Roderick (1981) described him as 'Monmouthshire's main and most important contributor to Welsh literature'. And Thomas (1988) described him as the greatest poet of Gwent in the 19th century.

Thomas died from bronchitis in Ynysddu in 1878. He is buried in Babell Chapel, Cwmfelinfach, where there is a monolith to his memory.

== The Islwyn Memorial Society ==
Harold Finch, the Member of Parliament for Bedwellty recounted in his book Memoirs of a Bedwellty MP that Edgar Phillips (bardic name Trefin), who was the Archdruid of the National Eisteddfod of Wales from 1960 until 1962, was particularly keen that Islwyn should be remembered in a tangible way. Consequently, Finch convened a meeting in November, 1967 in Blackwood to discuss the possibility. The meeting resulted in the creation of the Islwyn Memorial Society and the election of Finch as its first President. The intention of the Society was 'to fix plaques at notable places associated with the poet; carry out necessary work at Babell so that it can become a cultural centre; award prizes and scholarships at local schools; and award a poetry prize at the Royal National Eisteddfod.'

Finch documented: 'The Society organises annual special services (bilingual) in honour of the poet; and has a keen secretary in Alan Chiplin.' In 1971 the Society launched an appeal for £1,000 to enable the preservation of Babell. In 1977 the Society was registered as a charity with the objects of the advancement of education including 'the provision of prizes and/or scholarships at schools conducted as charities or those maintained by the local education authorities in the County of Gwent', 'awarding a prize annually at the Royal National Eisteddfod of Wales' and 'arranging local eisteddfodau and public lectures on the work of the Welsh poet'. However the Society was removed (i.e. it ceased to exist) in 2013.

== Works ==
- Barddoniaeth. Caerdydd Cardiff: Argraffwyd gan W. Owen. 1854.
- Caniadau / gan Islwyn. Gwrecsam: Cyhoeddwyd gan Hughes a'i Fab. 1867.
- Ymweliad y doethion a Bethlehem : y bryddest fuddugol yn Eisteddfod Ivoraidd Llanelli, 1867. Aberdâr Aberdare: Argraffwyd gan W. Lloyd. 1871.

== Archive ==
- Thomas, William. "Y Storm" (1856). Research notes and papers relating to Islwyn for the MA thesis of Meurig Walters and his publication of '"Y Storm" gyntaf gan Islwyn', ID: NLW MS 5860B. Aberystwyth: National Library of Wales. 22 May 2026.
