= Darran Valley =

Darran Valley: Welsh: Cwm Darran
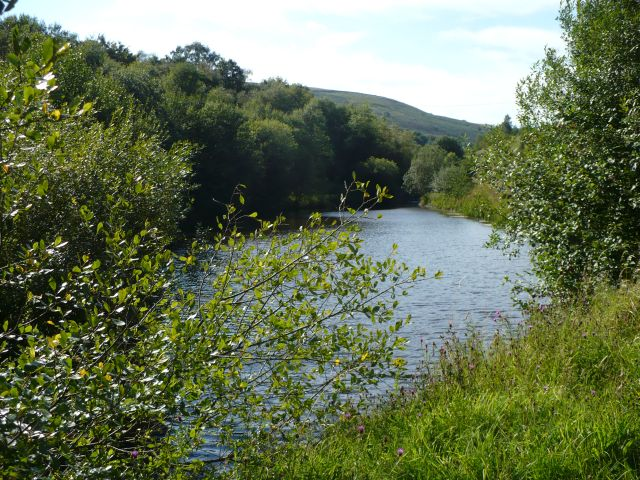
- Parc Cwm Darran

- Location within Caerphilly
- Population: 2,545 (2001)
- OS grid reference: SO112032
- Community: Darran Valley
- Principal area: Caerphilly
- Preserved county: Gwent
- Country: Wales
- Sovereign state: United Kingdom
- Post town: BARGOED
- Postcode district: CF81
- Dialling code: 01443
- Police: Gwent
- Fire: South Wales
- Ambulance: Welsh
- UK Parliament: Blaenau Gwent and Rhymney
- Senedd Cymru – Welsh Parliament: Caerphilly
- List of places UK Wales Caerphilly 51.7204°N 3.2869°W Map of the community

Darran Valley (Welsh: Cwm Darran) is a community in the County Borough of Caerphilly, Wales. The Darran Valley consists of the valley of the Bargod Rhymni and contains the villages of Deri, Pentwyn and Fochriw. These settlements grew around the Industrial Age to serve the collieries of Fochriw, Pencarreg and Groesfaen. As of 2001, the community had a recorded population of 2,545, increasing to 2,607 in 2011.

== History ==
The Groesfaen Colliery, which at 2,160 feet (660 m) was the deepest in the Darran Valley, opened around 1902. It was nationalised in 1947 and closed in 1968.
