= Wattsville F.C. =

Association football club in Wales

Wattsville Football Club
- Nickname: The Ville
- Founded: 2011
- Ground: Woodland View
- Manager: Matt Prosser
- League: Gwent County League Premier Division
- 2025–26: Gwent County League Premier Division, 14th of 16
Home colours	Away colours

Wattsville Football Club is a Welsh football team based in Wattsville in the Sirhowy Valley. The team currently play in the Gwent County League Premier Division.

== History ==
The club was founded by former Ynysddu Welfare Crusaders players Steven Prosser and Shane Bowen in the summer of 2011. The formation of the club came about after differences in opinions over how Ynysddu Welfare Crusaders was being run and managed.

The new club joined the North Gwent Football League First Division for the 2011–12 season, and finished runners-up to Ebbw Vale Town, gaining promotion into the North Gwent Premier. After a couple of seasons of consolidation (with mid-table finishes), the 2014–15 season saw the club being crowned Premier Division champions, scoring 135 goals with a positive goal difference of 103. This granted promotion into the Gwent County League Division Three.

The first season in the Gwent County League saw the club gain another promotion after finishing runners-up to Villa Dino Christchurch in Division Three. In 2017–18 the club challenged for the Division Two title before narrowly missing out to local rivals Ynysddu Welfare. A second-place finish however was enough to seal a fourth promotion in six seasons to the Premier Division.

In January 2021 the club announced plans for a 100-seat stand, one of the prerequisites for playing at Tier 3 level.

== Honours ==
- Gwent County League Division Two - Runners-up: 2017–18
- Gwent County League Division Three - Runners-up: 2015–16
- North Gwent Football League Premier Division - Champions: 2014–15
- North Gwent Football League Division One - Runners-up: 2011-12
