= Darran and Deri railway station =

Former railway station in Wales

Darran and Deri
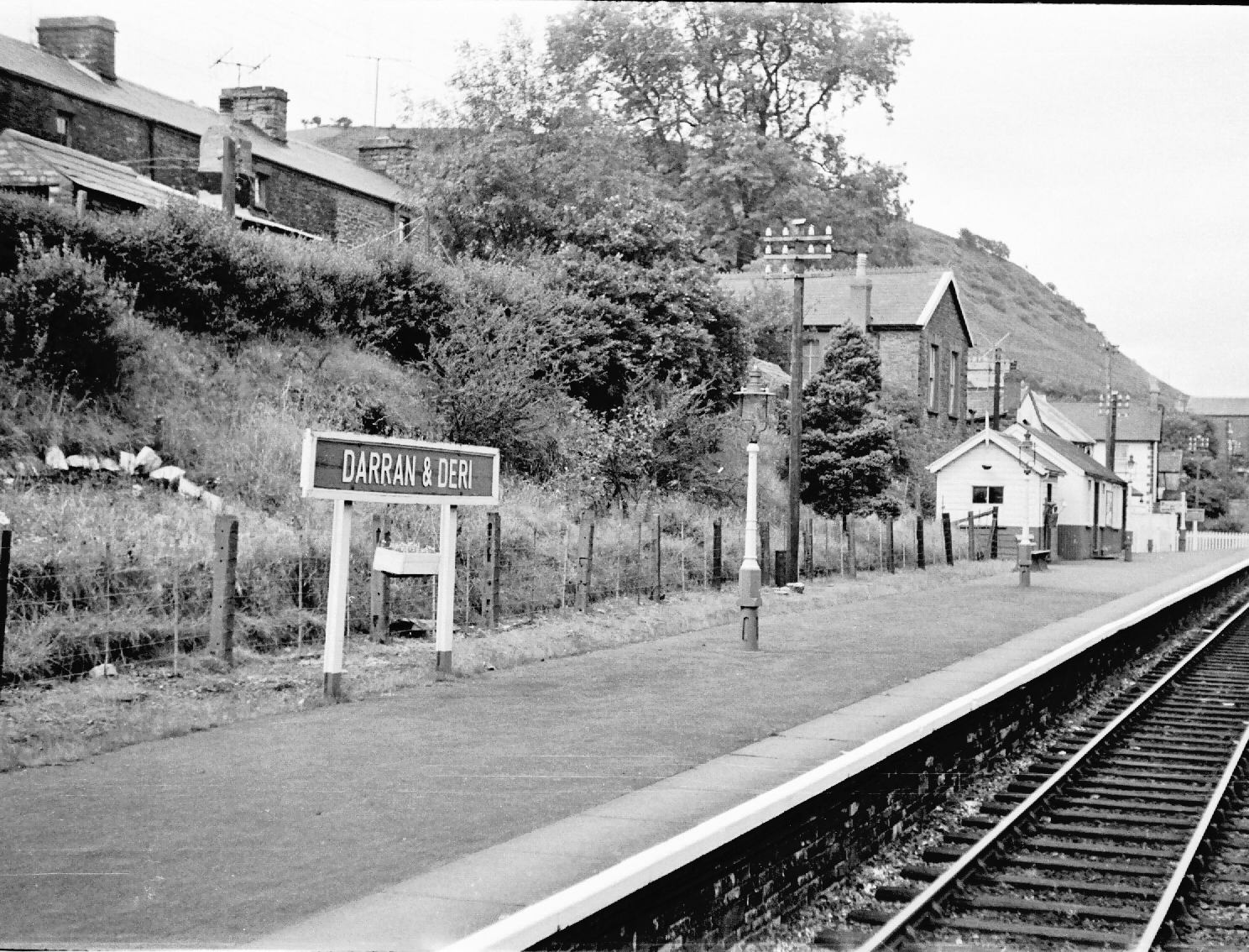
- September 1962

General information
- Location: Deri, Caerphilly; Wales
- Coordinates: 51.7077°N 3.2629°W
- Grid reference: SO 127018
- Platforms: 2

Other information
- Status: Disused

History
- Original company: Rhymney Railway
- Pre-grouping: Rhymney Railway
- Post-grouping: Great Western Railway; Western Region of British Railways

Key dates
- 1 September 1868: Station opens
- 31 December 1962: Station closes to passengers
- 1965: Station closes to goods
Location

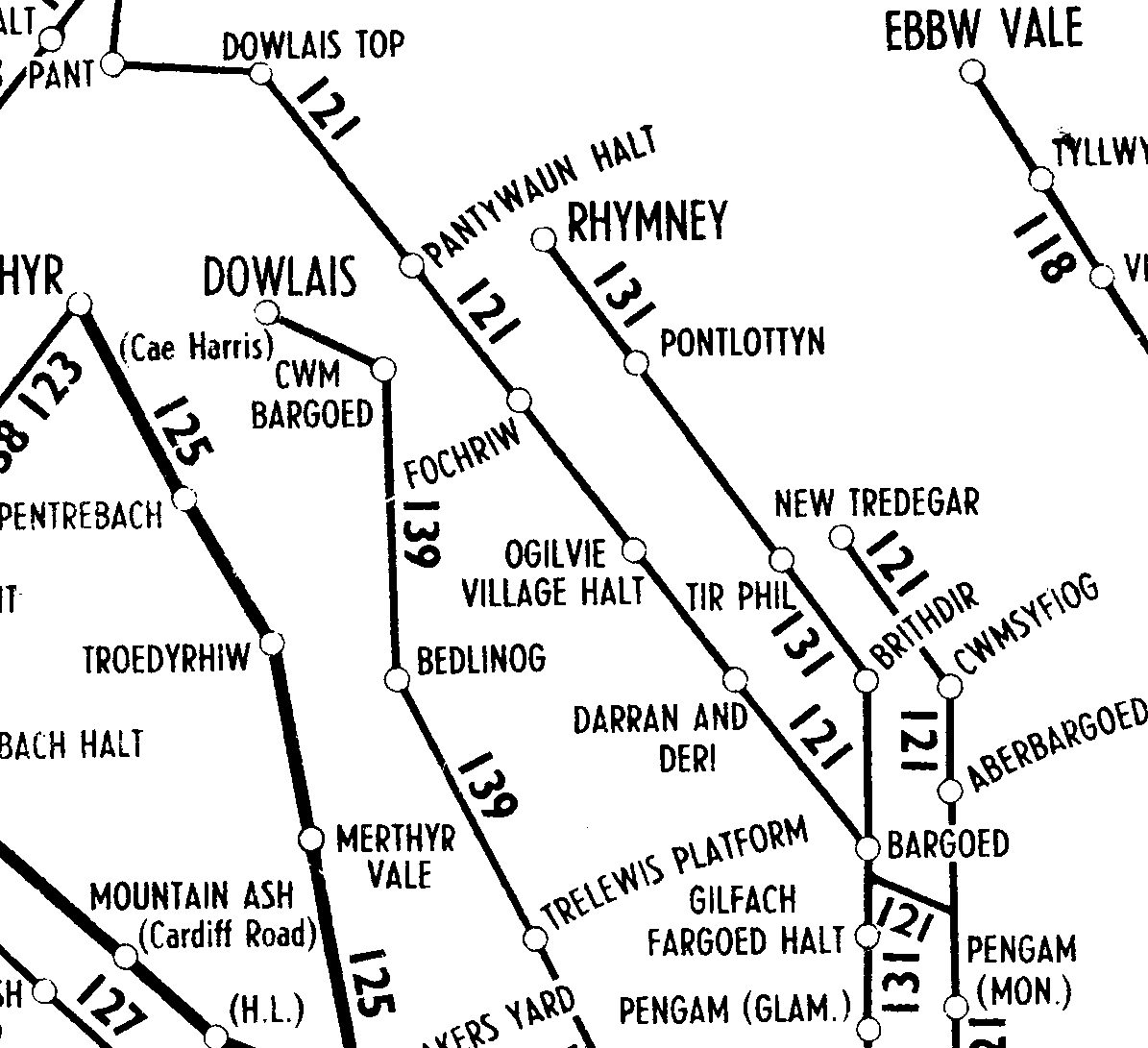
Map of rail lines in the Rhymney area, 1962

Darran and Deri railway station was situated on the Brecon and Merthyr Junction Railway, serving the adjoining village of Deri and the nearby Darran Colliery. It was located at 20 miles 08 chains from Newport. The line was built and owned partly by the Rhymney Railway and partly by the Brecon and Merthyr Railway, the boundary between the two companies lying a short distance north of Darran and Deri. The line passed to the Great Western Railway in 1923 and to British Railways (Western Region) in 1948.

The station opened on 1 September 1868 and passenger services were withdrawn from 31 December 1962. Goods and mineral traffic continued until 1965, but coal traffic passed the station site until final closure of the line in 1975. This portion of line was double track and the station had up and down platforms, with a goods yard on the eastern side as well as connections to local collieries. The passenger service consisted in the 1960s of about ten trains a day in each direction, of which four ran between Brecon and Newport.

The former railway route is now part of the National Cycle Network (route 469), with an access point at Deri village.

== Routes ==
Preceding station	Disused railways	Following station
Ogilvie Village Halt; Line and station closed	Rhymney Railway	Groesfaen Colliery Platform; Line and station closed
