= Cwmfelinfach =

Coordinates: 51.61730°N 3.17854°W

- OS grid reference: ST185916
- Principal area: Caerphilly
- Preserved county: Gwent
- Country: Wales
- Sovereign state: United Kingdom
- Post town: NEWPORT
- Postcode district: NP11
- Dialling code: 01495
- Police: Gwent
- Fire: South Wales
- Ambulance: Welsh
- UK Parliament: Islwyn

Cwmfelinfach is a small village located in the Sirhowy valley of south-east Wales. It is part of the district of Caerphilly within the historic boundaries of Monmouthshire. It is located west of Wattsville, about 5 miles north of the nearest town Risca, and south of Blackwood. To the east the valley is bordered by the hills of Pen-y-Trwyn (1,028 ft / 313 m). To the west is Mynydd y Grug (1,132 ft / 345 m).

Cwmfelinfach can be translated from Welsh as "valley of the little mill".

== History ==
The village was a small hamlet until the late 19th century; the majority of housing is therefore traditional terraced housing from the early 20th century. A map of 1885 shows the Melin (mill) and the Welsh Calvinistic Methodist chapel, Capel y Babell. The grave of William Thomas (Islwyn), a 19th-century poet in the Welsh language, can be found here. Cwmfelinfach was home to a coal mining community during the early to mid 20th century. The colliery, known as "Nine Mile Point", opened in about 1905 and closed in 1964. Nine Mile Point Colliery was the site of the first ever sit-in of miners; during 1935 there was a "stay-down strike" involving 164 colliers. They were protesting over the use of "Scab" miners (men not members of the Miners' Federation of Great Britain, unlike the rest of the "Points" workforce) and their ordeal only ended after the company promised that no non-Federation men would be employed at the colliery; the stay-down strike lasted for 177 hours. Miners from other collieries in the area, some taking similar action, supported their action.

== Transport ==
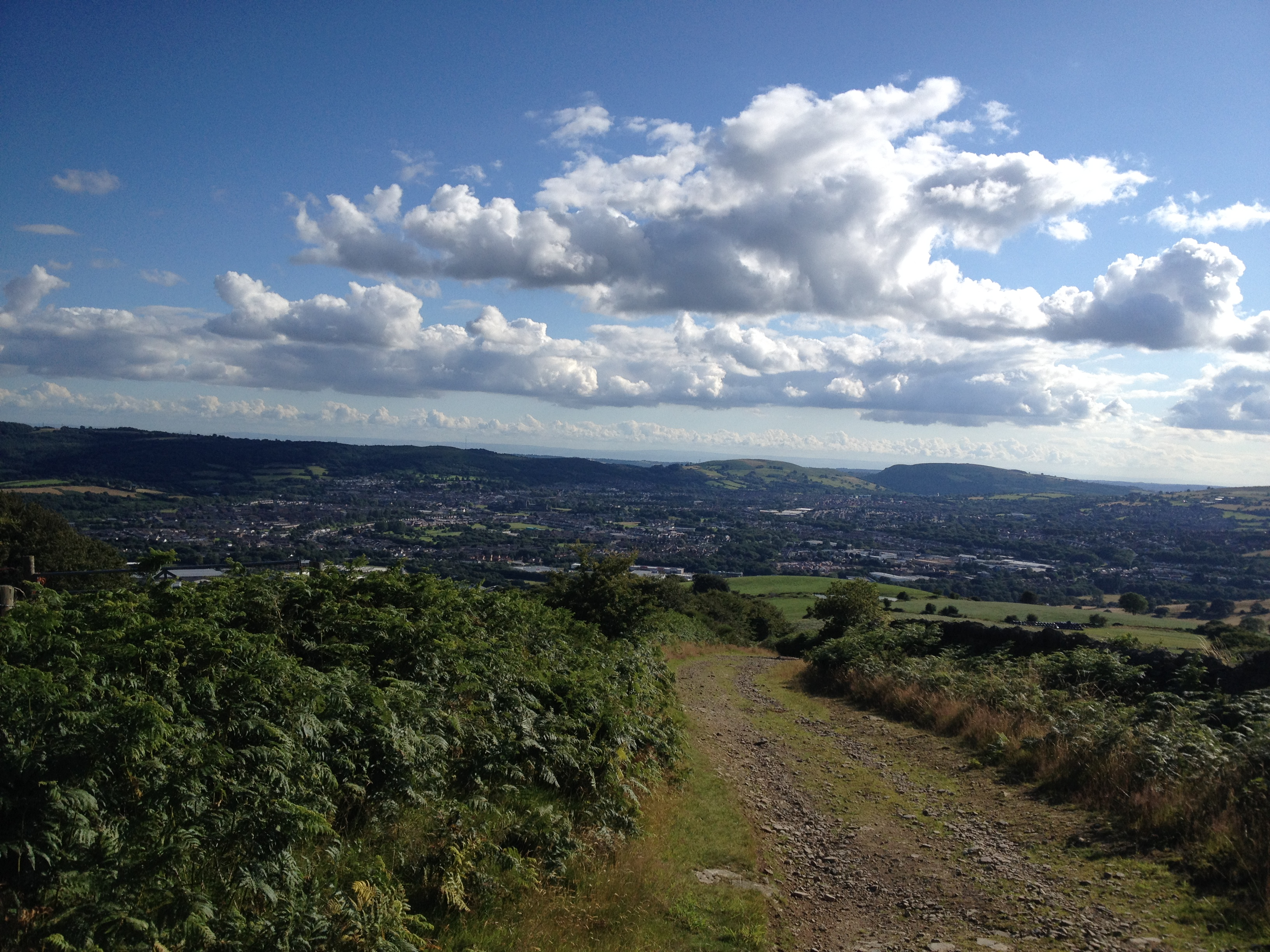
A view of Bedwas and Caerphilly from a side path through Ynys Hywel Activity Centre, which diverts from the main NCN 47 just before Cwmfelinfach.

The village is served by regular buses operated by Stagecoach Group to Tredegar and Blackwood in the north, and Newport city centre in the south.

Cwmfelinfach is also part of the Celtic Trail cycle route (National Cycle Route 47) which connects West Wales from Fishguard through to Carmarthen, Llanelli, Swansea, Merthyr Tydfil, Newport, and the Severn Bridge in the East.

Cwmfelinfach Bus Timetable
| Provider | Number | Destination | Journey time | Frequency |
|---|---|---|---|---|
| Stagecoach Group | 56 | Tredegar Bus Station | 39 minutes | Hourly |
| Stagecoach Group | 56 | Blackwood Interchange (Stand 9) | 16 minutes | Hourly |
| Stagecoach Group | 56 | Newport Bus Station (Market Square) | 33 minutes | Hourly |
