= Navigation Colliery, Crumlin =

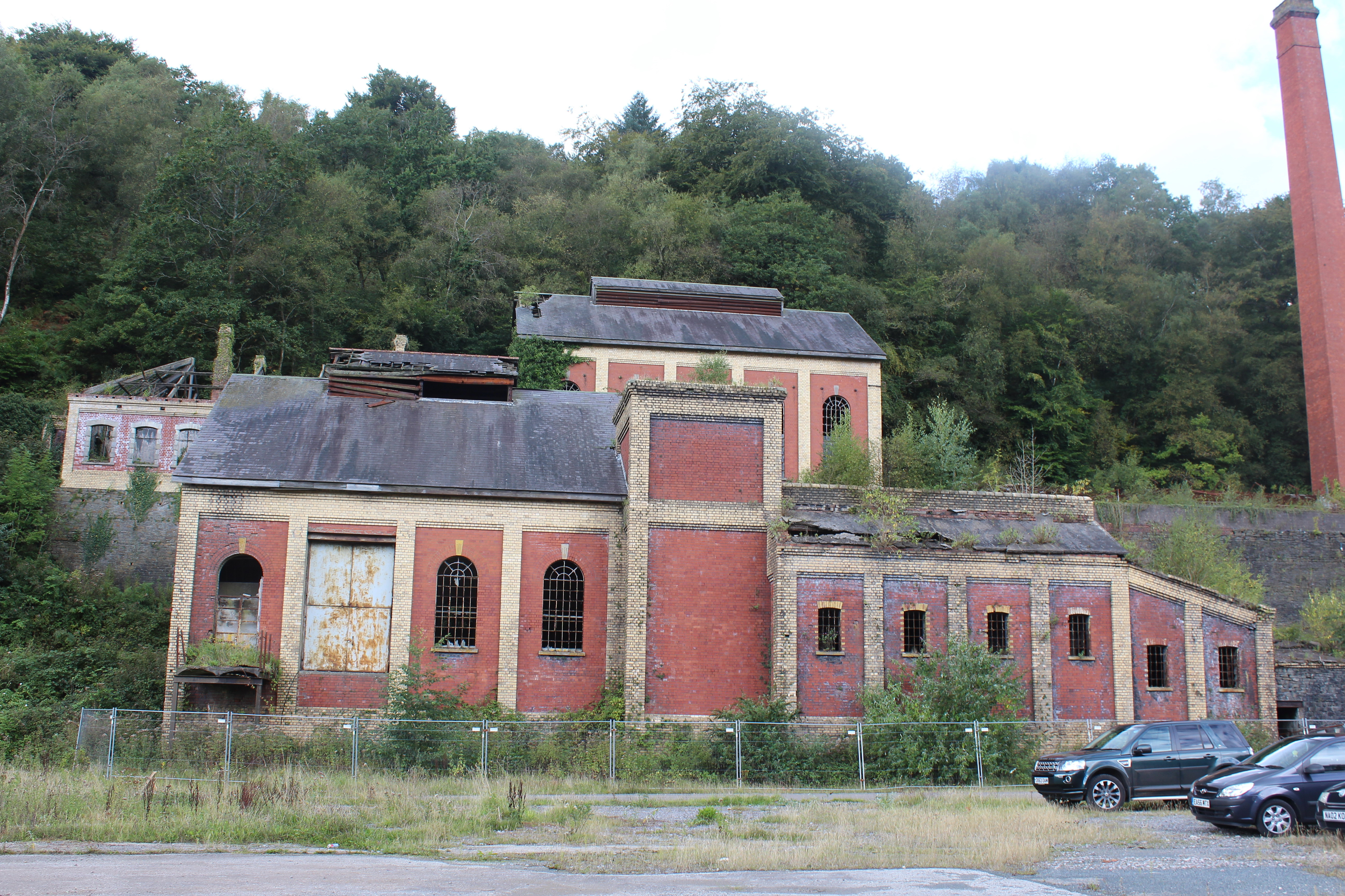
- Fanhouse

- Location within Caerphilly
- Interactive map of Navigation Colliery, Crumlin
- 51°40′56″N 3°08′33″W
- Type: Coal mine
- Location: Crumlin
- Nearest city: Cardiff

History
- Formed: 1907
- Founder: Patridge, Jones & Co.

Site notes
- Current use: Derelict
- Website: The Crumlin Navigation

Listed Building – Grade II*
- Official name: Former Navigation Colliery Chimney
- Designated: 27 January 1982
- Reference no.: 1890

Listed Building – Grade II*
- Official name: Former Navigation Colliery Fan House and Fan Drift
- Designated: 27 January 1982
- Reference no.: 1897

Listed Building – Grade II*
- Official name: Former Navigation Colliery North Winding Engine House
- Designated: 27 January 1982
- Reference no.: 1894

Listed Building – Grade II*
- Official name: Former Navigation Colliery Power House and Pump House
- Designated: 27 January 1982
- Reference no.: 1896

Listed Building – Grade II*
- Official name: Former Navigation Colliery South Winding Engine House
- Designated: 27 January 1982
- Reference no.: 1891

Navigation Colliery is a former coal mine in Crumlin, Caerphilly County Borough, Wales. Opened in 1911, at its peak it produced 145,000 tonnes of coal a year. The mine closed in 1967 and the site has been disused since. The Royal Commission on the Ancient and Historical Monuments of Wales (RCAHMW) considers the Navigation site to be "the best preserved colliery complex in South Wales". The complex contains thirteen listed buildings, five at Grade II*, the rest at Grade II. The site is now managed by a charitable trust, Glofa Navigation Cyf, which seeks to redevelop it for community benefit.

== History ==
The construction of Navigation Colliery began in 1907 and was complete by 1911. The owners were Partridge, Jones & Co. The winding engines and the fan engine were manufactured by Walker Brothers of Wigan. (Note: One of the Walker Brothers engines was removed on the mine's closure, and reassembled and operated at the Welsh Industrial and Maritime Museum in Cardiff Bay. The museum closed in 1998.) At its height, the colliery employed over 700 men, and produced over 145,000 tonnes of coal a year. The pithead baths, opened in 1933, had facilities to accommodate 800 miners. Such baths were constructed after the Miners' Welfare Act 1926 introduced provision for their funding. The Durham Mining Museum records ten deaths at the colliery during its operation but this is an underestimate. (Note: The People's Collection Wales holds a selection of artefacts and records relating to the mine.) The colliery ceased production and was closed in 1967. The site is now managed by a charitable trust, Glofa Navigation Cyf (The Crumlin Navigation Trust). The trust, working with the owners, the South Wales Building Preservation Trust, seeks to redevelop it for community benefit. In 2013 the Victorian Society placed the complex on its At Risk register. Funding shortfalls, and the challenge presented by an unstable, underground culvert at the site, were exacerbated in 2020 when Storm Dennis destroyed part of the culvert roof. In 2022 students from the School of Architecture at Cardiff University took the Navigation site as the basis of a finals project, and exhibited redevelopment plans at the colliery.

== Architecture and description ==
The Navigation Colliery site is broadly rectangular, the buildings standing on two terraces in the Ebbw River valley. The Royal Commission on the Ancient and Historical Monuments of Wales (RCAHMW) notes the "unusual architectural quality" of the site’s buildings. These are constructed in red brick, with yellow brick accents. The use of brick was relatively rare, the more common building material being local rubble. In his 2018 study, The Architecture of Wales: From the First to the Twenty-first Century, John B. Hilling notes the "dramatic" use of polychromatic brick at Crumlin. John Newman, in his Gwent/Monmouthshire volume in the Buildings of Wales series, describes the colliery complex as the "finest group in Wales and an outstanding example of the proud showpieces Edwardian owners could erect when the South Wales Coalfield was the largest coal-exporting area in the world". Five of the buildings on the site are listed at Grade II*, while another eight are listed at Grade II. The chimney, the Fan House, the North Winding Engine House, the Power and Pump Houses, and the South Winding Engine house are listed at Grade II*. The colliery baths, an Electrical House, the heapstead, the Lamp room, a revetment wall, the Colliery Offices, the Powder Store and another, attached, revetment wall, and the Workshops and Stores are listed at Grade II.

== Sources ==
- Hilling, John B. (2018). The Architecture of Wales: From the First to the Twenty-first Century. Cardiff: University of Wales Press. ISBN 978-1-786-83284-9. OCLC 1034615762.
- Newman, John (2000). Gwent/Monmouthshire. The Buildings of Wales. London: Penguin. ISBN 0-14-071053-1.
