= St Luke's Campus =

University campus in Exeter, England

Coordinates: 50°43′23″N 3°31′02″W

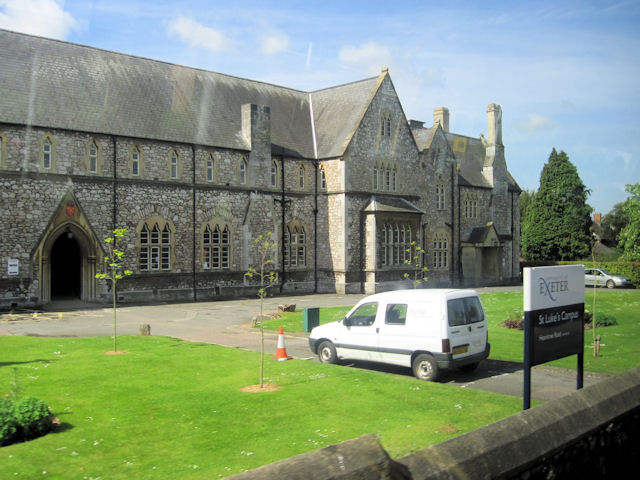
St Luke's Campus

St Luke's Campus is a small university campus which is part of the University of Exeter. The School of Sport and Health Sciences, the Graduate School of Education, and the Medical School are all based at St Luke's.

St Luke's is also home to the Children's Health and Exercise Research Centre (CHEREC). The centre, part of the School of Sport and Health Sciences, was awarded the Queen's Anniversary Prize for higher education in recognition of its eminence in paediatric physiology. This made CHEREC the first receiver of the award in sport science research.

== History ==
St Luke's College was opened on 18 October 1854 as the new premises of the Exeter Diocesan Training School that had been established as a Church College of Education in the Cathedral Close in 1839 to train schoolmasters.

Through the second half of the 19th century, the college buildings and grounds were greatly developed.

St Luke's suffered a direct hit during a World War II bombing raid on Exeter that destroyed a large part of the original building. The stone work has been rebuilt and is clearly visible due to a change in the colouring of the brick work. After the war the college was known as St Luke's Training College.

Women students were first admitted in 1966, by which time the college was known as St Luke's College Exeter. It still had a strong Christian emphasis as a Church of England foundation.

In 1978 the college joined the University of Exeter and ceased to be an independent Anglican college.

=== Gallows location ===
Part of the current campus car park, just to the east of College Avenue, was, from the 16th century to 1818, the site of the Heavitree gallows for Exeter. The three convicted Bideford "witches" were hanged there on 25 August 1682; their bodies were buried nearby where, presumably, their bones still remain somewhere beneath the car park.
