= Deri, Caerphilly =

Coordinates: 51.7054°N 3.2676°W

Deri
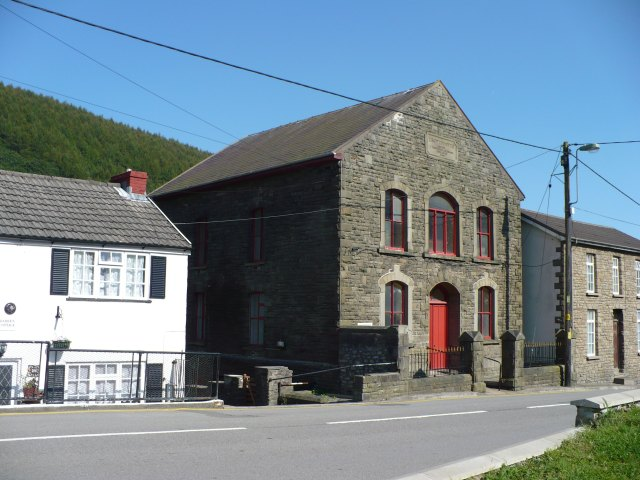
- Ysgwyddgwyn Presbyterian Church

- Location within Caerphilly
- OS grid reference: SO112032
- Principal area: Caerphilly
- Preserved county: Gwent
- Country: Wales
- Sovereign state: United Kingdom
- Post town: BARGOED
- Postcode district: CF81
- Dialling code: 01443
- Police: Gwent
- Fire: South Wales
- Ambulance: Welsh
- UK Parliament: Blaenau Gwent and Rhymney
- Senedd Cymru – Welsh Parliament: Merthyr Tydfil and Rhymney

Deri is a village in Caerphilly County Borough, Wales. 'Deri' is Welsh for oak trees. Deri along with Pentwyn and Fochriw make up the community of Darran Valley.

The village grew around the Industrial Age to serve the collieries of Fochriw, Pencarreg and Groesfaen. It was served by Darran and Deri railway station until its closure.

== Notable people ==
Deri is the birthplace of musician Julian Cope.
