= Wattsville =

Village in South Wales

Coordinates: 51°37′05″N 3°09′18″W

Wattsville is a small village in the Sirhowy Valley, eight miles north west of Newport, built in the 20th century for accommodation for mine workers.

== Amenities ==
Modern Wattsville consists of two villages, Wattsville and Brynawel. It consists of one main street (Islwyn road) with another hugging the valley below. Wattsville is the base for the Sirhowy valley country park, starting at the tourist centre in Full Moon Cottage (the site of a 19th-century village of Full moon), a site for hillwalking and mountain biking on the old railway trackbed.

== History ==
Further up the valley at Cwmfelinfach is the old site of Nine Mile Point Colliery. This was the site of the first ever 'sit in' of miners. At Wattsville the New Risca Mine, opened 1878 and was 855 feet deep. It was located on the eastern edge of Wattsville and was the first colliery in South Wales to have electric lighting at the pithead and underground in 1892.

The bassist and lyricist of Manic Street Preachers Nicky Wire lived in Wattsville and wrote a song about the village called "Wattsville Blues", where he describes his love of the village. The song appears on the album Know Your Enemy.

About halfway up the main street, there is a noticeable gap in the terrace. This is where 4 houses used to stand, which were flattened due to subsidence from underground mine workings. There is now a monument and garden on the site. There is a similar gap next to the play area on Duffryn Terrace.

Wattsville is home to a football club named Wattsville F.C.

Just north-east of the village is Wattsville Castle, a four-storey drystone structure built by Mikey Allen, construction of which began in 2019, and which became a local tourist attraction visited by over 10,000 people. In 2024, after Caerphilly Council received a complaint, it was ordered to be demolished, a process expected to be completed in 2025.

== Notable people ==
- Osi Rhys Osmond, artist
- Clive Westlake, songwriter
- Nicky Wire, musician
