= David Constable =

British candlemaker and author

David Constable (born Edgware, London 29 September 1939 died Pontllainfraith, Gwent, Wales 26 September 2023 ) was a British candlemaker and author, who ran Candle Maker's Supplies in Gelligroes Mill, Blackwood, Caerphilly, Wales. An expert in candle making, he is noted for being a candlemaker to the British royal family for over 30 years and for British and Hollywood films and television. Constable is also a well-known educator in the art of candle making and has authored several books which have been translated into 10 languages.

== Early life and career ==
Constable was born in London in 1939. At the age of 17 he went to live in Germany for several years where he became fascinated by the variety of candles being made there. Returning to London in the early 1960s he found an absence of candle shops and began making his own candles as a hobby. He began candle making as a professional in 1969 with his partner Annie, setting up a shop initially in Moor Park Road and then Beaconsfield Terrace Road, and then Blythe Road in West Kensington in 1976, just behind the Olympia Exhibition Hall. By this time he was contributing to artistic magazines such as The Artist. He began making appearances on TV shows such as Pebble Mill, The Generation Game, where he was the guest expert on three occasions, Vision On, and many others.

In 1980, Constable collaborated with Lesley Judd to make a film about candle making, which was aired several times on BBC. In 1989, he was commissioned by the British Epilepsy Association to make a giant candle measuring 30 feet by 3 ft 6, weighing over seven tonnes. It took four winter months for the wax to fully set.

In 1991, by royal warrant he became the official candlemaker to Prince Charles and a regular candlemaker for royal residences including Highgrove and St. James Palace and various royal events. In 1993, Constable set up shop in Gelligroes Mill, Blackwood, Caerphilly, Wales, and also runs a shop on Shepherds Bush Road in London. He has made candles for the Harry Potter film series, the Pirates of the Caribbean film series, First Knight, Interview with a Vampire, Cinderella, The Huntsman, Gosford Park, Sherlock Holmes, Doctor Who, Game of Thrones, Downton Abbey, and Merlin. He also made the candles for the Wedding of Prince William and Catherine Middleton in 2011.

== Teaching and publications ==
Constable has taught candle making by running workshops at Gelligroes Mill. He taught Bollywood actress Dimple Kapadia the art of candle making.

He has authored a number of books on the art of candle making which have been translated into 10 languages, including Candlemaking: Creative Designs and Techniques (1992), Beginner's Guide to Candlemaking (1997), Candle Making: Funstation (1998), Gel Candles (2002) and Beeswax Crafts: Candlemaking, Modelling, Beauty Creams (1996) with Norman Battershill and Polly Pinder.

== Personal life ==
Constable has been married to Julie since 2012. The couple have a son, George, born in 1988.
