= Oakdale, Caerphilly =

Coordinates: 51.679328°N 3.180151°W

Oakdale
- Location within Caerphilly
- Population: 4,478
- OS grid reference: ST193990
- Community: Penmaen
- Principal area: Caerphilly
- Preserved county: Gwent
- Country: Wales
- Sovereign state: United Kingdom
- Post town: Blackwood
- Postcode district: NP12
- Dialling code: 01495
- Police: Gwent
- Fire: South Wales
- Ambulance: Welsh
- UK Parliament: Newport West and Islwyn
- Senedd Cymru – Welsh Parliament: Casnewydd Islwyn

Oakdale is a large village in Caerphilly county borough, Wales, 9½ miles north of Caerphilly itself, within the historic boundaries of Monmouthshire. Situated in the Sirhowy valley, it is 1.5 miles (2.4 km) east of Blackwood, with which it forms a conurbation. At the 2001 census Oakdale had a population of 4,478.

== History ==
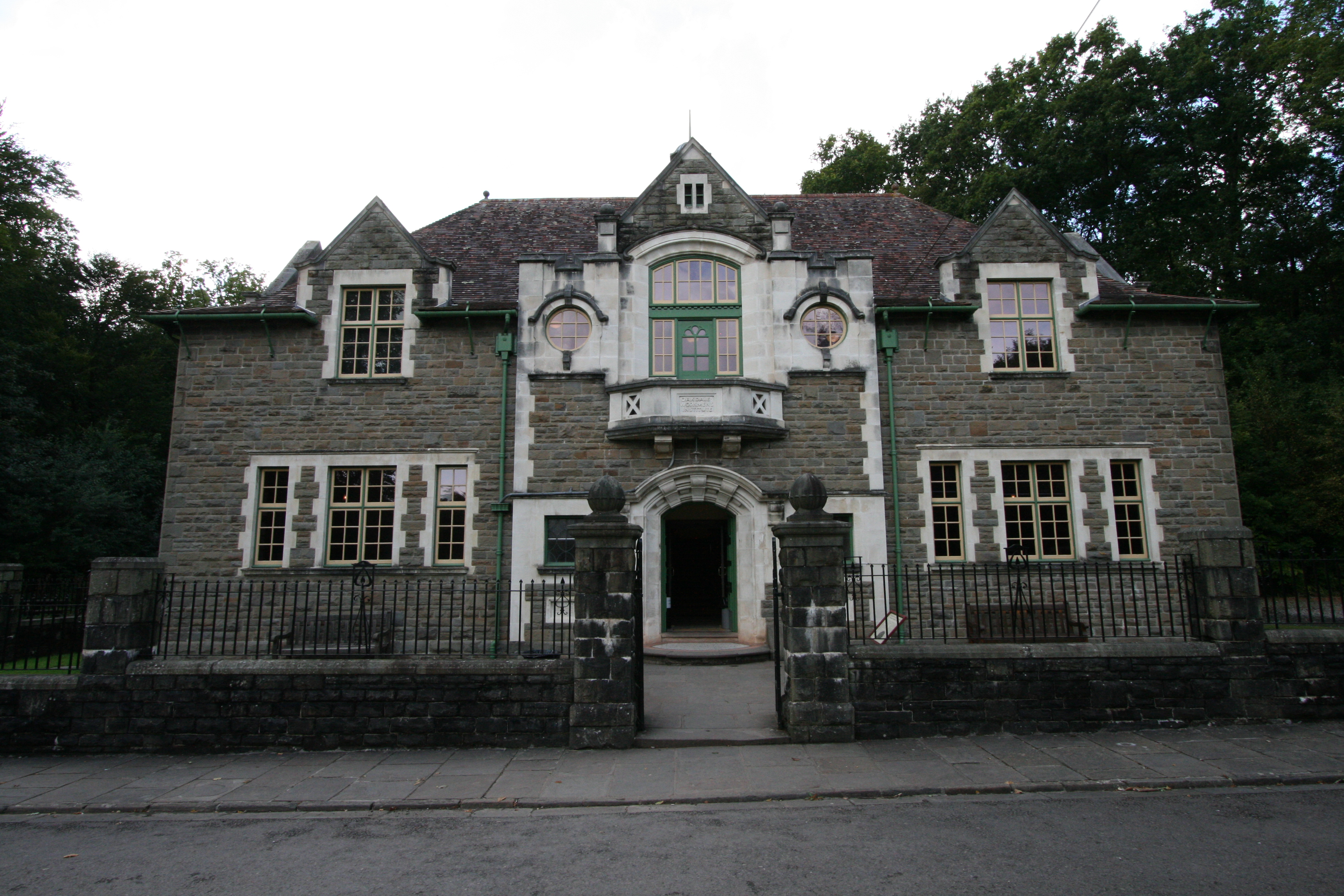
Oakdale Workmen's Institute at St Fagans National Museum of History

In the early years of the twentieth century the need for coal was growing both in America and Europe, and local business men in Wales were looking for new opportunities to fill the demand.

Among these were a group known as the Tredegar Iron and Coal Company, made up of wealthy industrialists from the Maclaren, Markham, Pochin, Whitworth and Wyllie families. They decided to create a group of collieries in the Sirhowy Valley, which explorations had told them contained rich seams of " black gold." One of these was at the small rural hamlet of Rhiw Syr Dafydd within what would become the village of Oakdale. This Welsh name is still used by a local primary school, although other uses on maps and newspapers date to the 1940s at the latest. There is no official Welsh name, however alternative Welsh names have been used such as Cwmderi, Cwmderwen, Glyn-y-deri or Glyn-derwen, with a local school using the name "Cwm Derwen".

Work began clearing the site for the new colliery at Oakdale with the sinking of the pit in 1907. Waterloo shaft followed in 1911 and the building of the village commenced soon after, to house the families of the men who were to work there.

The revolutionary "model village" was the brainchild of the manager of the Tredegar Iron and Coal Company, Mr A S Tallis. This village, in contrast to others in the area, was to be built away from the mine among green fields. The houses would be modern, with hot and cold running water, large cooking ranges, electric light, and - perhaps most revolutionary of all - bathrooms. Every house was to have a front and back garden, so that no front door would open directly on to the street as in other valley towns and villages.

These ideas were in themselves original enough. But the concentric design of the village that was conceived by Mr Tallis's brother-in-law, Mr F R Webb, was even more radical. It was laid down with a central road (Central Avenue) and transverse roads conforming to a horseshoe shape, with linking "spoke" roads, making any road in the village easily accessible from any other.

It has been described by John Newman as "by far the most ambitious attempt by any mining company in south Wales to provide planned housing for its workforce."

The build commenced with housing, but later included schools, chapels, a hospital, a miners' institute and a cinema (the Picture House).

Opened in 1911, the colliery was owned by the Oakdale Navigation Collieries Ltd, a subsidiary of the Tredegar Iron Company. It employed a workforce of 2,235 at its peak in 1938.

In 1920 the village received a visit from Prince Albert, Duke of York (later to become King George VI) in his capacity of President of the Industrial Welfare Society. York Avenue, in the centre of the village, is so named to commemorate the visit.

Oakdale colliery was linked to Markham and the Celynen North collieries in the late 1970s and early 1980s, making it the largest colliery in Gwent. The pit closed in 1989 and the tips have now been landscaped and converted into platforms for industrial development.

The Oakdale Workmen's Institute was considered to be such a fine example of a miners' institute that, after its closure, it was demolished brick by brick, transported to, and re-erected at, St Fagans National History Museum in Cardiff.

== Modern Oakdale ==
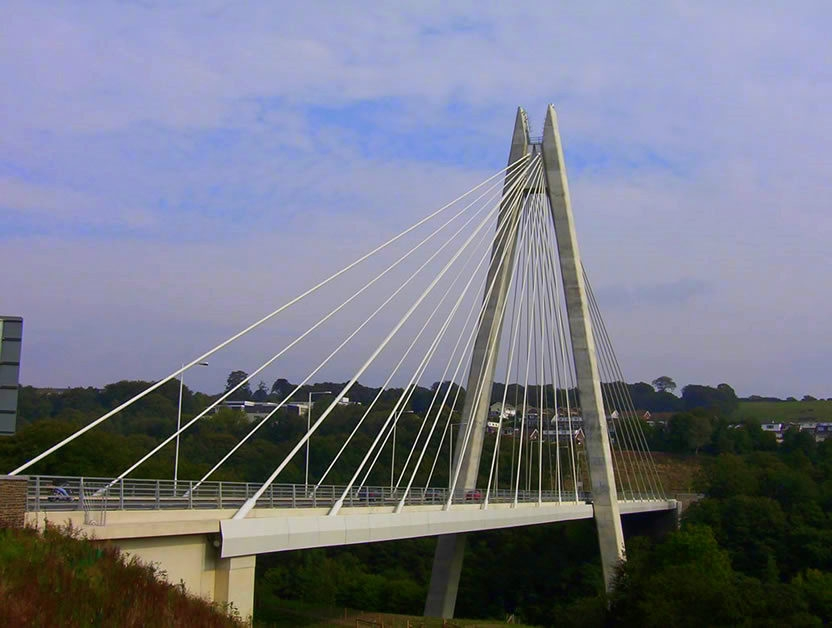
Chartist Bridge

Oakdale Business Park, a 400-acre (1.6 km^{2}) site on the former location of Oakdale Colliery took 6 years and over £10 million to reclaim, creating one of the largest plateau in the South Wales Valleys of 100 acres (0.40 km^{2}). It has attracted world-famous business names such as General Dynamics, which has based its UK Headquarters there.

Access to the area has been made considerably easier by the construction of the Sirhowy Enterprise Way, which includes the striking, cross-valley, Chartist Bridge.

With the rapidly expanding workforce has come the need for houses and the village has seen an explosion of building in the past few years, including a new Primary school, and the former primary school at Rhiw Syr Dafydd has become a Welsh medium school called Ysgol Gymraeg Cwm Derwen.

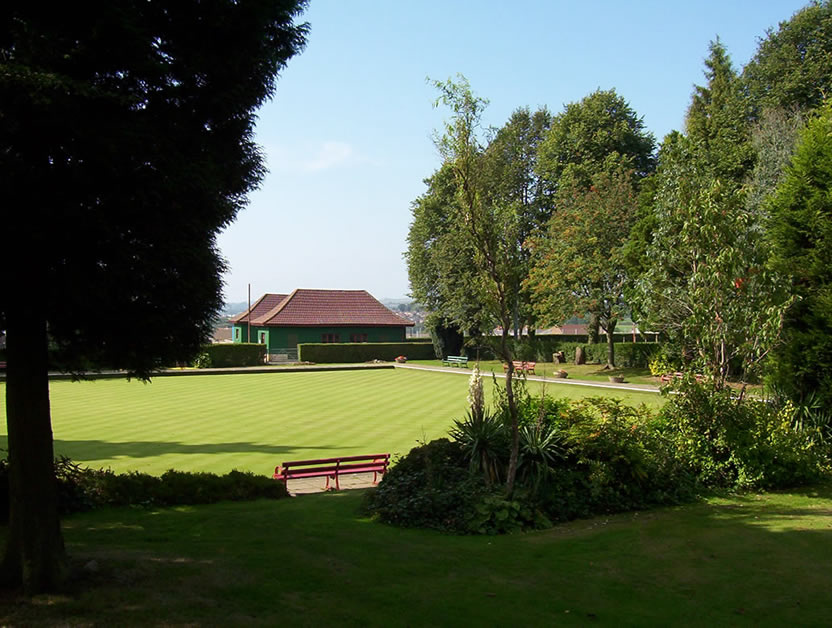
Bowling Green

The Oakdale and Penmaen Partnership (TOPPS), set up in 2004, is a group of voluntary members made up from the local community. It brings together representatives from the local statutory, voluntary, community and private sectors to address local problems, allocate funding, discuss strategies and initiatives. They aim to encourage joint working, and community involvement and prevent 'silo working' (i.e. different agencies that share aims working in isolation) with the general aim of ensuring resources are better allocated at a local level. They also act as a middle ground between the local community and Caerphilly Council.

== Demographics ==
According to the United Kingdom Census 2001 the population of the Penmaen ward (which comprises Oakdale and the peripheral hamlets of Pen-y-Fan and Woodfieldside) was 4,478, of which 2,144 were males and 2,334 females. Of these 99.7% are identified as White, 51.9% are married, 7.9% remarried, 6.83% divorced, 8.3% widowed and 23.6% single. Professional, technical, managers and senior officials account for 33.9% of the population, while 26.9% of males and 40.4% of females age 16–74 years (including students and the retired) were said to be economically inactive. 85.3% of housing is owner occupied, with 13.3% being rented.

== Education ==
There are three schools operating in the village:

- Rhiw Syr Dafydd Primary School, which caters for children from 3 to 11. Pupils transfer to Islwyn High School
- Ysgol Gymraeg Cwm Derwen does the same, but in the Welsh language. Transfer to Ysgol Gyfun Cwm Rhymni.
- Oakdale Comprehensive School was an 11 to 16 co-educational comprehensive school of just over 800 pupils. Sixth-form provision was at Coleg Gwent in Crosskeys, and Ystrad Mynach College.
- Islwyn High School, which replaced Oakdale Comprehensive School in 2016.

== Sport ==
Oakdale Rugby Club play in the Welsh Rugby Union Division Two East league, and are a feeder club for the Newport Gwent Dragons. Their home games are played at the Recreation Ground, and in addition to the senior team the club has two thriving junior sides.

There is a bowls club that regularly meets by the Oakdale Recreation Ground at a dedicated bowls green.

Oakdale Aikido Club has been in existence since 1973, training twice weekly at Oakdale Comprehensive School. There are also badminton, junior football, karate, Tang Soo Do (Korean karate) and netball clubs.

There was a nine-hole parkland golf course at Llwynon Lane, including an 18-bay driving range. However, both closed in 2018 and are being converted into new housing developments.

== Notable residents ==
- James Dean Bradfield, Richey James Edwards, Sean Moore and Nicky Wire all attended Oakdale Comprehensive School, forming the rock band Manic Street Preachers.
- Former WBO, WBC, WBA, Ring Magazine world super middleweight champion, and Ring Light Heavyweight champion Joe Calzaghe CBE, Newport Gwent Dragons and Wales centre Matthew Watkins, singer Steve Strange and poet Patrick Jones were also pupils at the school.
- Former pupils of Rhiw-Syr-Dafydd Infants school include Dame Patricia Morgan-Webb, opera singer Dame Margaret Price, Wales rugby international John Jeffery, musician Glyn Hale, and Air Commodore David Davies.
- Samuel Meekosha VC, (aka Samuel Ingham) lived in the village until his death in 1950.
- (Lord) Paul Hamlyn, founder of the Hamlyn group of publishers and Music for Pleasure worked as a Bevin boy at Oakdale Colliery.
- Welsh-language poet, novelist and television and radio broadcaster T. Glynne Davies also worked as a Bevin boy at Oakdale.
- Former Welsh international rugby player Haydn Morgan was born in Oakdale.

== See also ==
- Oakdale Hospital
- Oakdale colliery
- Oakdale Comprehensive School
- Oakdale RFC
