= Islwyn Borough Transport =

Defunct Welsh bus operator

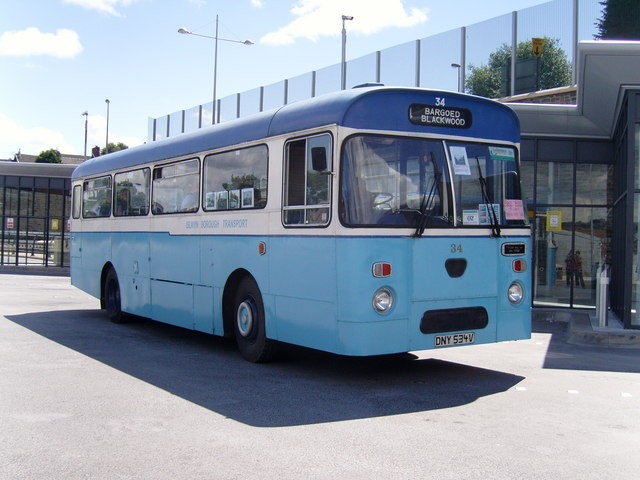
- Preserved Leyland Leopard in Blackwood in July 2007
- Founded: April 1974
- Ceased operation: January 2010
- Headquarters: Pontllanfraith
- Service area: Islwyn (1974-1996); Caerphilly (1996-2010); Cardiff
- Service type: Bus operator
- Fleet: 33 (January 2010)

Islwyn Borough Transport was a Welsh bus operator providing services around Blackwood, Caerphilly, and surrounding towns in the former Borough of Islwyn between 1974 and 2010.

== History ==
Islwyn Borough Transport was formed on the creation of the Borough of Islwyn in April 1974. The area had previously been part of West Monmouthshire. From 1926, it had been served by the West Monmouthshire Omnibus Board, which, as MynyddIslwyn Urban District Council, was a joint operation with Bedwellty Urban District Council. It was expanded by taking over some of the services and vehicles of three local operators. A depot in Blackwood High Street was used from 1926 to 1984, when a new depot in Pontllanfraith was opened. A second change in local government saw Islwyn become part of Caerphilly County Borough in April 1996, and control of the company passed to Caerphilly County Borough Council.

In November 2009, it was announced that the Borough Council had agreed to sell the company to Stagecoach Group. The move attracted some criticism within the region, as no other potential buyers had been consulted: local bus operator Clayton Jones stated that he would have made a bid had the proposal been openly discussed. It was also noted that the council had lost around £15 million after the collapse of an Icelandic bank during the 2008 financial crisis. The council described claims that the two events were linked as a "wild accusation", noting that Stagecoach intended to retain all Islwyn staff members. The deal was concluded in early January 2010, with Islwyn's operations integrated with those of Stagecoach in South Wales. At the time of the sale, it was the smallest of the remaining municipal bus companies.

== Operations ==
=== Bus routes ===
Prior to its sale in 2010, Islwyn operated 18 local bus routes centred on Caerphilly and Blackwood, taking in Cardiff and Bargoed. School contracts were also operated, but no services were run on Sundays.

Its routes are now operated by Stagecoach in South Wales.

=== Coaches ===
The logo for IBT's coach brand, Kingfisher Travel

The company operated coaches from 1988. Independent operator Paul Diaper Tours was taken over in 1991, and the coaching division rebranded to Kingfisher Travel. The operations were sold to Diamond Holidays in 2009.
