= John Jeffery (rugby union) =

Wales international rugby union footballer

- Born: James John Jeffery; 26 February 1945 (age 81) Oakdale, Wales
- Height: 6 ft 2 in (1.88 m)
- Weight: 14 st 13 lb (95 kg)
- School: Pontllanfriath Grammar
- University: Cardiff College of Education

Rugby union career
- Position: Number 8
Amateur team(s)
Years	Team	Apps	(Points)
- Rhymney RFC
–	Blackwood RFC		
–	Newport RFC		
–	Ebbw Vale RFC		
–	Barbarian F.C.		
–	Monmouthshire		
International career
Years	Team	Apps	(Points)
1967	Wales	1	(0)

James John Jeffery (born 26 February 1945) is a former Wales rugby union international.

== Product of Pontllanfraith ==
John Jeffery was born in Oakdale and educated at Pontllanfraith Grammar School, the same school attended by British Lion Alun Pask. He played for Welsh Schools in the 1962-63 season and Pontllanfraith School continues to acknowledge his achievements by awarding the annual player of the year trophy in his name.

== Newport RFC and the Barbarians ==
Having played for a series of clubs, he joined Newport RFC in the 1965-1966 season. He played for the club for nearly ten years making 210 appearances, scoring 55 tries and Captaining the team between 1970 and 1972. He also played 10 times for the Barbarians, including an appearance against South Africa.

== Wales caps ==
In November 1967, he played as number 8 for Wales against New Zealand at Cardiff Arms Park in a Welsh team that included Barry John, Gareth Edwards and John Taylor. The New Zealand side included greats such as Colin Meads and Brian Lochore. New Zealand won the game scoring two converted tries and a penalty to Wales' single penalty and a drop goal.

The following year he toured Argentina with a Wales team that was captained by John Dawes.
