= Oakdale Workmen's Institute =

Building re-erected at St Fagans National Museum of History, Cardiff, Wales

Coordinates: 51.4880°N 3.2785°W

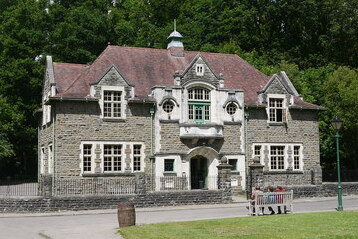
The Oakdale Workmen's Institute in its present location at St Fagans

Oakdale Workmen's Institute is a public building originally erected at Oakdale, Caerphilly, Wales, in 1917 and now located at St Fagans National Museum of History, Cardiff.

The foundation stone of the institute was laid on 3 July 1916, and it was officially opened on 10 September of the following year. Alfred S. Tallis, managing director of the Tredegar Iron and Coal Company, which owned Oakdale Colliery, represented them at the opening ceremony; the company had lent money to the local miners' organisations to enable them to build the "'Stute" as it became popularly known.

The initiative to found the Institute came from several local groups who met in the temporary workers' barracks that had been erected by the colliery owners. The new building soon became a focal point of the community, and included a library, billiards room and meeting hall. Original minute books relating to the operation of the institute during the 1940s are held by the Gwent Archives. An extension was built in 1927 and films began to be shown there, but the cinema ceased to function in the 1970s, and the Institute itself closed in 1987.

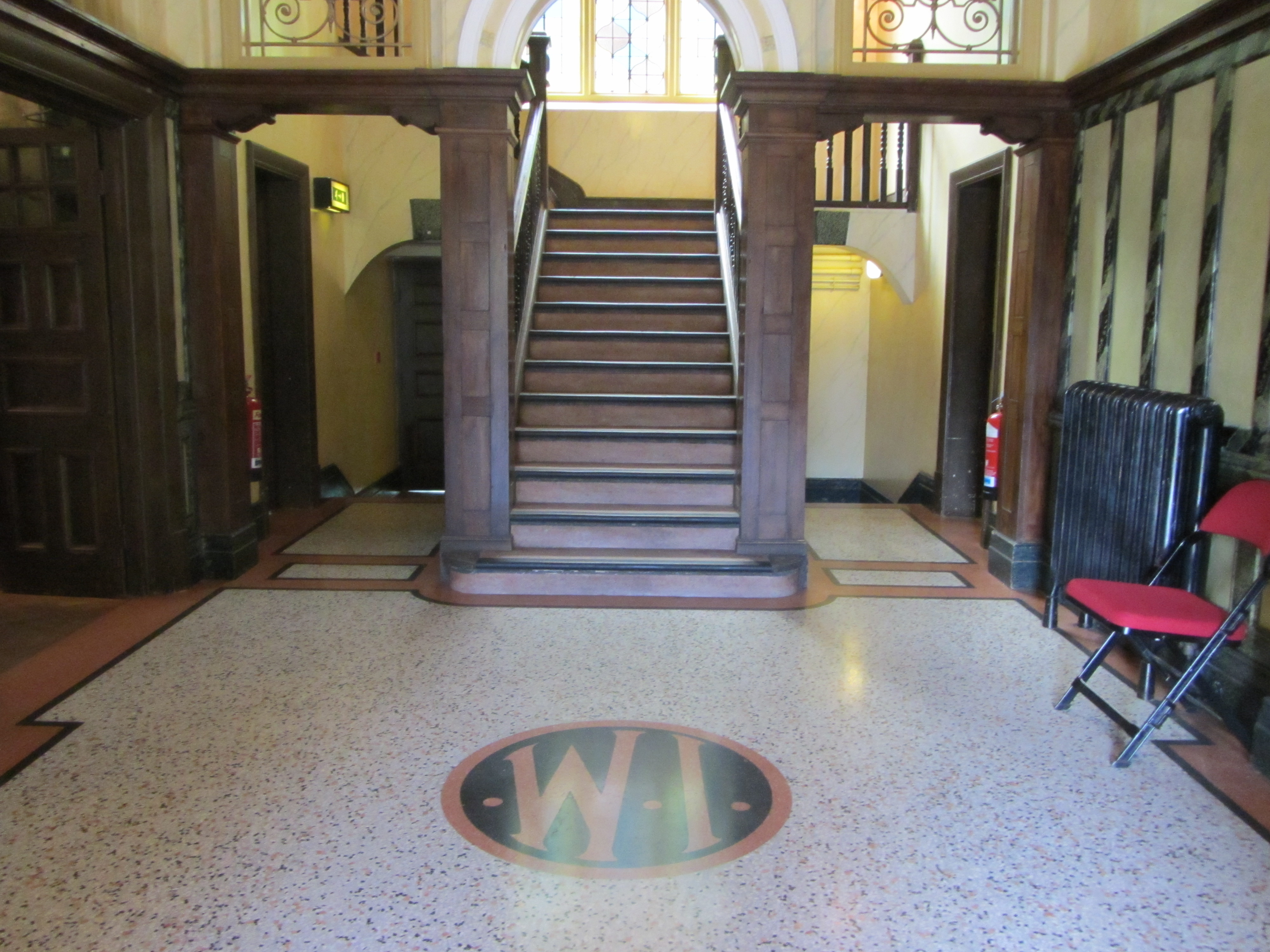
Foyer of the Oakdale Workmen's Institute

The institute was taken down in 1987, two years before the closure of Oakdale Colliery, and was relocated to St Fagans, where it was officially opened to the public in 1995 by Neil Kinnock.
