= Artie Moore =

Welsh wireless operator

- Born: Arthur Ernest Moore; 29 April 1887; Pontllanfraith, Wales
- Died: 20 January 1949 (aged 61); Bristol, England
- Occupations: radio operator and engineer
- Known for: Reportedly hearing the distress signal from RMS Titanic in 1912
- Notable work: wireless radio, sonar development

Arthur Ernest Moore (29 April 1887 – 20 January 1949) was a Welsh Wireless pioneer who is said to have heard the distress signal from RMS Titanic on his home-made equipment before news of the disaster reached Britain. He subsequently worked for the Marconi Company, helping to develop radio and sonar.

== Early life ==
Arthur Ernest Moore was born in Pontllanfraith, near Blackwood, where his father owned Gelligroes Mill.

At a young age Moore was involved in an accident at the mill which resulted in the loss of the lower part of one of his legs. For the rest of his life, he wore a wooden leg. By the age of ten, Moore had developed an interest in amateur engineering and he adapted a bicycle to cater for his wooden leg.

At some point prior to 1909, most likely in his early teenage years, using a hand-made lathe driven by the waterwheel at the mill, Moore built a working model of a horizontal steam engine. The model won a competition in Model Engineer magazine; the prize, a book by Sir Oliver Lodge entitled Modern Views of Magnetism and Electricity, awakened his interest in Wireless.

After Moore and his brother took over operation of the mill from their father, they used a generator coupled to the mill wheel to charge batteries to provide electrical power for local farmers, who were not yet connected to the mains supply; they also created machinery for them.

== Home-made wireless station ==
In a garden shed and later in the loft of the mill, Moore built a rudimentary radio station consisting of a coherer-based receiver and a spark-gap transmitter, also powered by batteries charged from the mill wheel. He strung copper wire across the Sirhowy River and uphill to a barn to create a large aerial system that enabled him to receive distant signals. In 1911, he intercepted the Italian government's declaration of war on Libya and was featured on the front page of the London newspaper the Daily Sketch.

Using the spark-gap transmitter technology of the time, Moore together with his friend Richard Jenkins, an electrical engineer at the local coal mine, made what was probably the first use in Wales of amateur wireless for business purposes. Having set up a second transmitting and receiving station at Ty Llwyd farm, owned by Jenkins's father which was located approximately three and a half miles south of Gelligroes at Ynysddu, Moore received an order over the air for grain to be delivered from the mill to the farm.

=== RMS Titanic claim ===
Early on 15 April 1912, over a distance of more than 3,000 miles (4,800 km), Moore heard the distress signal in morse code from Titanic. He bicycled to the police station in Caerphilly, where his report was discounted; two days later, press reports confirmed the accuracy of his report, including that the ship's wireless operator had used "SOS" in addition to the older "CQD" code for a ship in distress.

== Wireless career ==
In summer 1912, the publicity surrounding Moore's hearing the Titanic's distress signal led the then Monmouthshire Education Committee to offer him a scholarship to the British School of Telegraphy in London. After three months of study, he was advised by the principal there to enter for a Government examination in Wireless Telegraphy and Morse Code, in which he was successful.

Guglielmo Marconi, the wireless pioneer, had predicted a range of above 2,000 miles (3,200 km) for wireless reception, which Moore had greatly exceeded. After a local resident wrote to him concerning Moore, Marconi visited him and offered him a position as a draughtsman at the Marconi Company. Appointed in 1914 to the Ship Equipment Department, he worked for Marconi's companies for the rest of his career.

During the First World War, Moore became a technician in "special Admiralty fittings", working on the clandestinely armed Q-ships and designing and supervising the installation of wireless equipment on the Invincible-class battlecruisers HMS Invincible and HMS Inflexible to enable them to communicate with Britain on their mission to the Falkland Islands. He later became assistant to Captain H.J. Round and worked with him on the further development of the thermionic valve.

At war's end, he was transferred to Liverpool, where he headed the newly formed Ship Equipment Department. In 1923, he was transferred to the Marconi International Marine Communication Company and appointed manager at Avonmouth, where he remained until his retirement in 1947. In 1922 he patented an early form of sonar; during the Second World War, his sonar work was instrumental in helping Allied ships avoid German U-boats in the North Atlantic.

== Later life and death ==
Soon after his retirement, Moore developed leukaemia; he moved to Jamaica to recuperate, but six months later returned to Britain, where he died in a convalescent home in Bristol on 20 January 1949.

== Legacy ==
Moore inspired local wireless enthusiasts to create in 1927 the Blackwood Transmitters Club, later the Blackwood Amateur Radio Society.

The Artie Moore Amateur Radio and Historical Preservation Society are creating an Artie Moore archive and periodically transmit from Gelligroes Mill with the amateur radio callsign MW0MNX, based on Moore's MNX.
