= Blackwood, Caerphilly =

Town in Caerphilly, Wales

Coordinates: 51.67°N 3.19°W

Blackwood: Welsh: Coed-duon
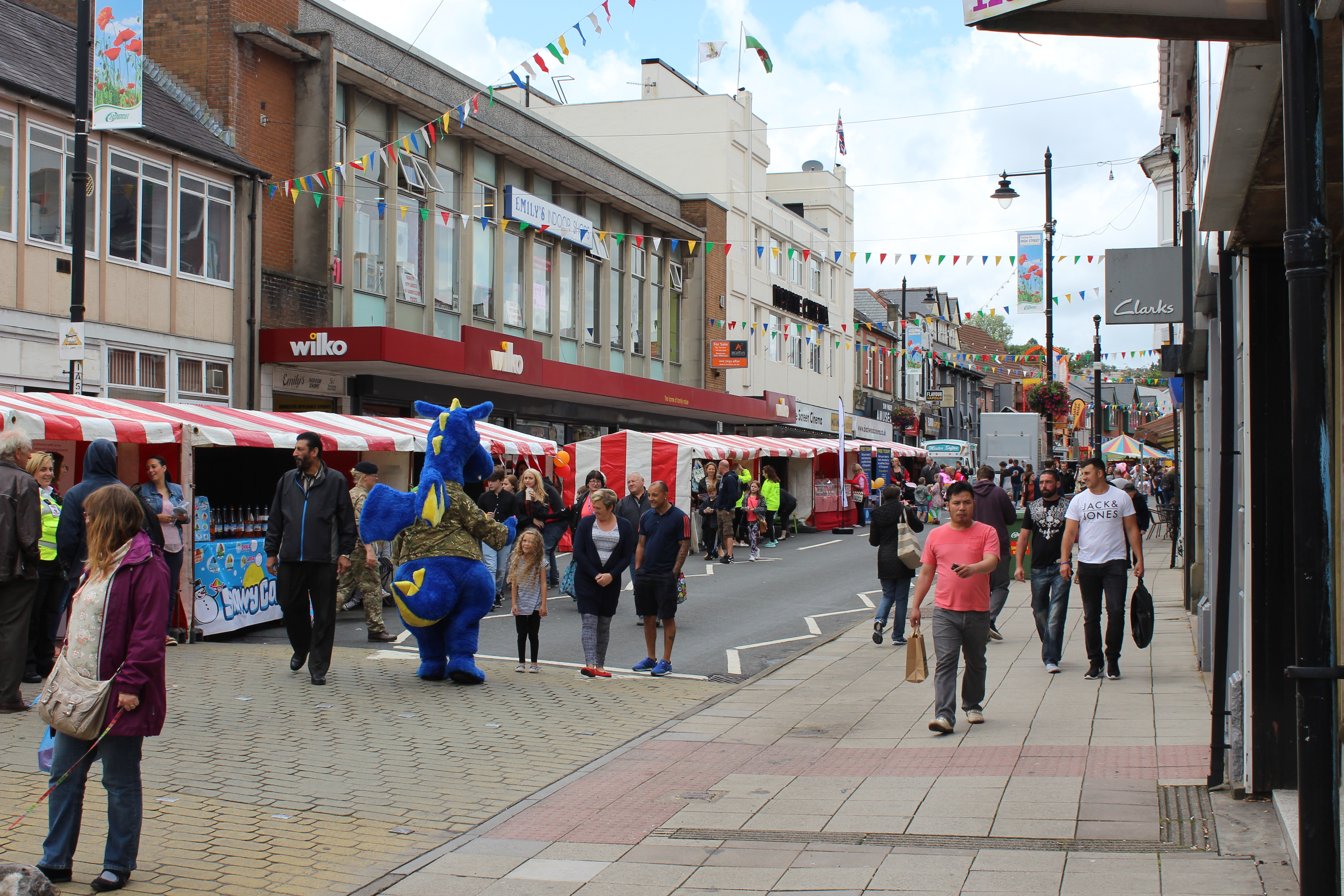
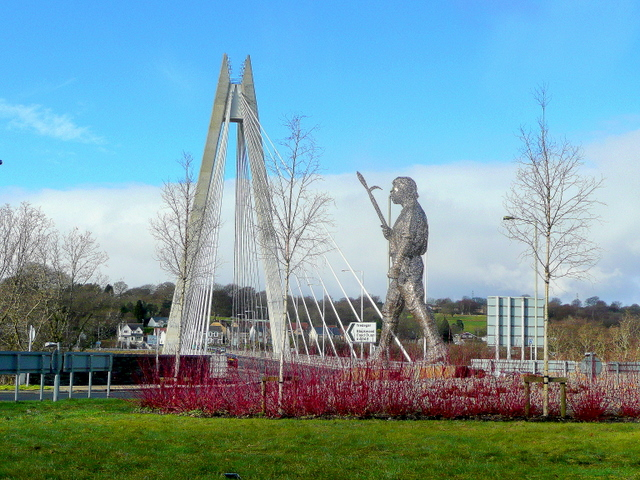
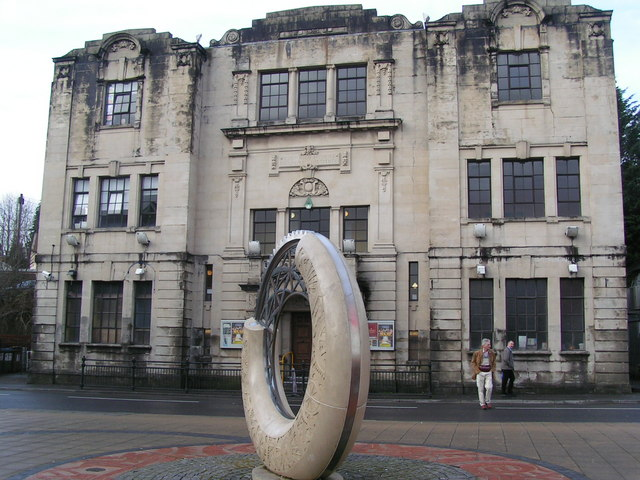
- From the top, Blackwood Centre, Chartist Statue & Bridge, The Miners Institute

- Location within Caerphilly
- Population: 8,496 (2011)
- Language: English; Cymraeg (Welsh)
- OS grid reference: ST175975
- Principal area: Caerphilly
- Preserved county: Gwent
- Country: Wales
- Sovereign state: United Kingdom
- Post town: BLACKWOOD
- Postcode district: NP12
- Dialling code: 01495, 01443
- Police: Gwent
- Fire: South Wales
- Ambulance: Welsh
- UK Parliament: Newport West and Islwyn
- Senedd Cymru – Welsh Parliament: Casnewydd Islwyn
- Website: blackwoodtowncouncil.org.uk

Blackwood (Welsh: Coed Duon or Coed-duon) is a town, community and an electoral ward on the Sirhowy River in the South Wales Valleys administered as part of Caerphilly County Borough. It is located within the historic county of Monmouthshire.

The town houses a growing number of light industrial and high-tech firms. It is the home town of influential rock band Manic Street Preachers.

== History ==
Blackwood was founded in the early 19th century by local colliery owner John Hodder Moggridge, who lived at nearby Woodfield Park Estate: the first houses in Blackwood were built by Moggridge in an attempt to build a model village.

Deplorable working conditions at the time of the Industrial Revolution, however, led to Blackwood becoming a centre of the Chartist movement in the 1830s. The South Wales Chartist leaders John Frost, Zephaniah Williams (a Blackwood man) and William Jones met regularly at the Coach and Horses public house in Blackwood, which was demolished in 1958, but has its former location marked with a plaque. Their march on Newport, in what became known as the Newport Rising in 1839, was intended to coincide with a Britain-wide 'revolution' against the Government, the gentry and the Establishment.

When the insurrection erupted in November a large contingent of insurgents gathered at Blackwood. Upon meeting their comrades from the upper Sirhowy Valley the rebels armed themselves with makeshift weapons and marched south to Newport to demand the adoption of the People's Charter and the release of Henry Vincent from Monmouth County Gaol. However, the South Wales Movement were the only ones to march and the national rising failed and its leaders were sentenced to death (later commuted to deportation to Tasmania).

In 1912 the Titanic's distress signals were picked up by amateur wireless enthusiast Artie Moore who resided at the Old Mill, Gelligroes, just outside the town. Moore went on to work as a senior scientist for Marconi and was involved with the invention of the transistor for telecommunications.

The former Penllwyn House on the outskirts of the town was originally part of the Lord Tredegar Estates and is believed to be the original home of the family of Henry Morgan (c. 1635 – 1688), a privateer and Governor of Jamaica. The building is now a public house The town is home to the Maes Manor Hotel, located in a grand old manor house known as Maesrudded. The house was formerly home to the Lord Lieutenant of Monmouthshire.

Evan James (Ieuan ap Iago, 1809–93) was a weaver and wool merchant by profession and owner of the Ancient Druid Inn in Hollybush, in the parish of Bedwellty, Monmouthshire. He moved to Pontypridd when his son James (Iago ap Ieuan, 1833–1902) was a young boy. Evan James and his son James are credited with composing the Welsh national anthem, 'Hen Wlad fy Nhadau' ('Land of my Fathers') in 1856. Evan was a poet and it is believed that he wrote the words while his son James composed the tune. The song was published in the volume 'Gems of Welsh Melody' (1860) and soon became extremely popular. It is not certain when the song was first adopted as the Welsh national anthem. A memorial, designed by W. Goscombe John, was erected in honour of Evan and James James in Ynysangharad Park, Pontypridd, in 1930.

The decline of the coal mining industry throughout the later part of the twentieth century affected South Wales, the major source of employment was lost and the landscape left daily reminders of what had been. State backed rejuvenation schemes have gone some way to rejuvenate the wider Blackwood area, including the relief road and various light industrial areas.

== Contemporary Blackwood ==
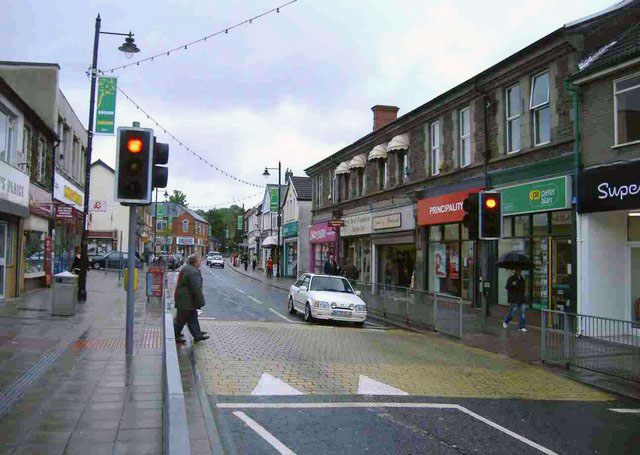
High Street, Blackwood

In sport, Blackwood has two rugby union and one rugby league sides, all of whom play at Glan-yr-Afon Park. The rugby union sides are Blackwood RFC, established in 1889, and Blackwood Stars RFC, originating c. 1920. The rugby league club is called the Blackwood Bulldogs and plays in the Welsh Conference Premier. Rugby players Kevin Moseley, Alun Pask and Alun Lewis hail from the town.

Blackwood also has a cricket club called Blackwood Town Cricket Club that plays in the Glamorgan and Monmouthshire League Division One. A number of Blackwood players have gone on to play for Glamorgan, Ryan Watkins and Kyle Tudge amongst them.

The Bus Station, which links Blackwood to a lot of surrounding areas and includes a rail-link service to nearby train stations, has had a make-over.

Blackwood's cinema, the Maxime, was originally purpose-built as a cinema in 1938, was then used as a bingo hall, but is now once again a five-screen cinema. Some of the original decor has been preserved in the foyer.

Blackwood is twinned with Protivín, a small town in the Czech Republic.

== Landmarks ==
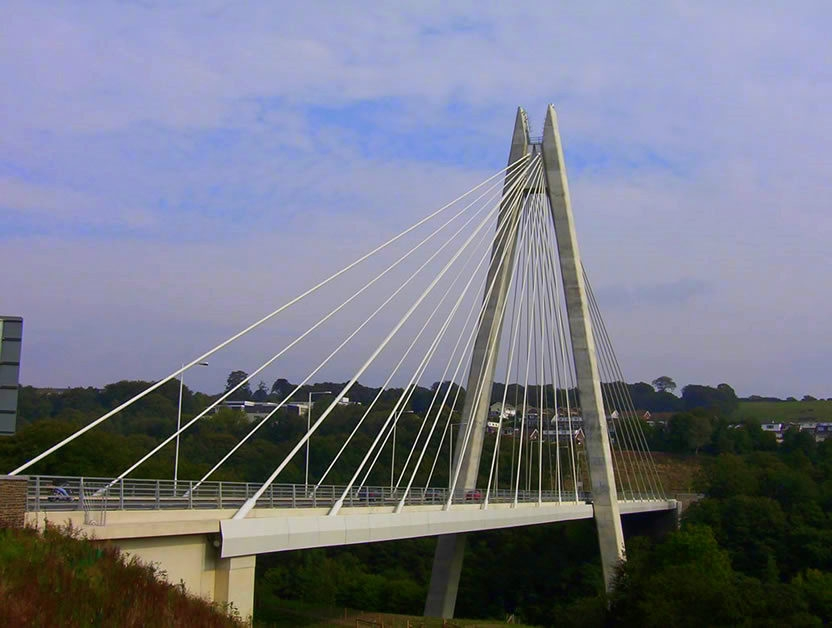
Chartist Bridge

=== The Chartist Bridge ===
The Arup designed Chartist Bridge linking the East and West sides of the Sirhowy Valley. Previously the journey was made by de-tour or over a 1 in 4 road through the bottom of the valley known locally as the Rhiw.

The bridge is a part of the Sirhowy Enterprise Way, regeneration project and opened four months ahead of schedule on 3 December 2005.

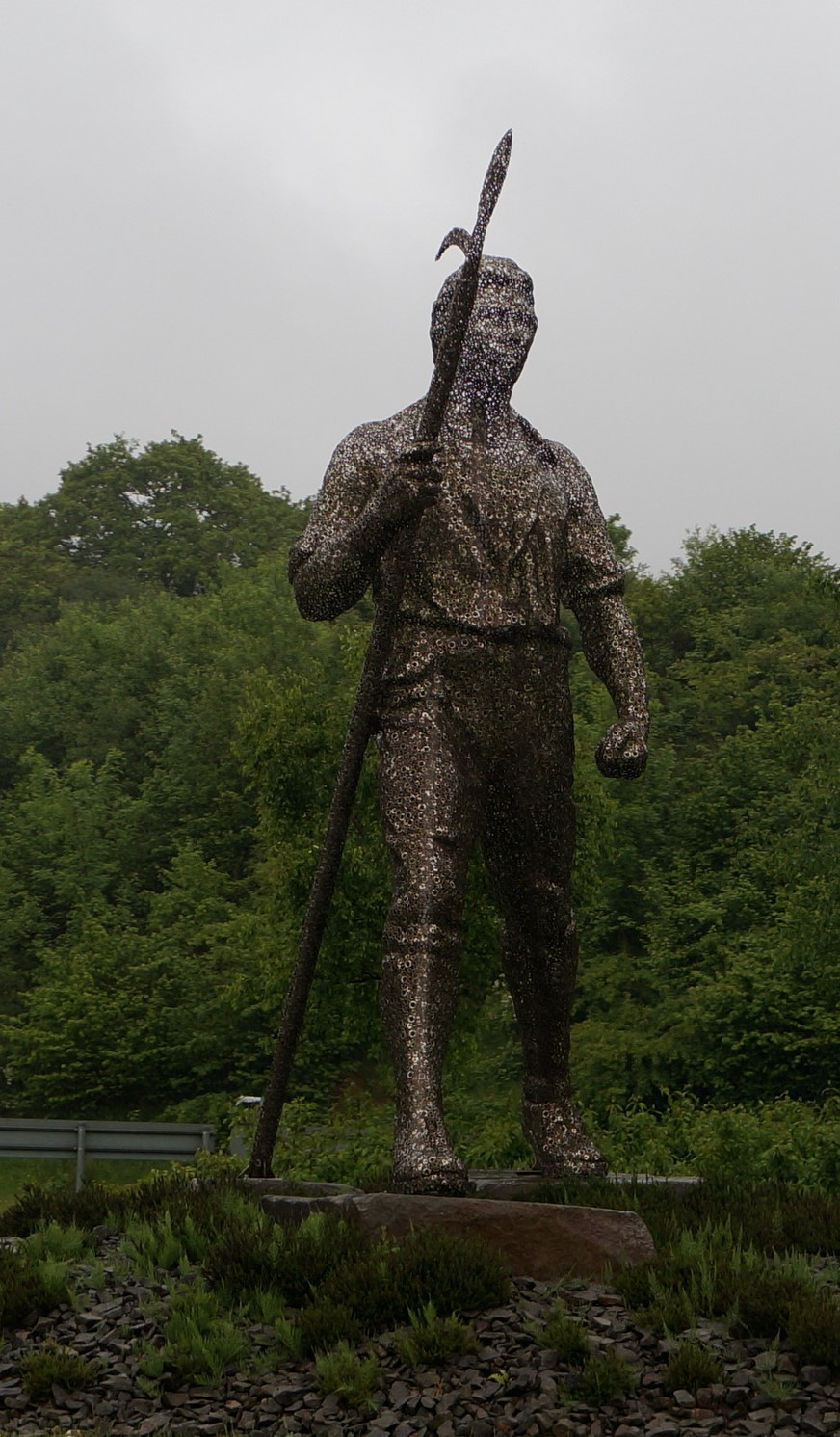
Chartist Statue in Blackwood

The bridge is a cable-stayed bridge 230m long supported 30m above the valley floor by a 90m A frame pylon. Difficulties with mining-related subsidence during construction and in the foreseeable future led the design team to allow the bridge to breathe if settlement does occur. The bridge and the Sirhowy Enterprise Way are operated and maintained by the DBFO Company (Design, Build, Finance and Operate) in accordance with the DBFO contract for a period of thirty years.

A statue to honour the Chartist struggle and their march to Newport has been erected on the East side of the bridge while a name plate is situated on the West. The statue itself is a figure of a chartist striding forward, pike in hand. It is made up of thousands of brass rings, which should represent the idea of "strength in unity".

=== Miners Institute ===
Blackwood Miners Institute is described by Caerphilly County Borough Council as the "Heart of the Community", from its inception in 1925 as Snooker Hall to its current Multi Entertainment Venue it sits at the heart of the town's event programme and is known locally as "The 'stute".

In 1925 a Snooker Hall was opened, by the Coal Industry and the Social Welfare Organisation, and funded by the miners of Oakdale Colliery at the rate of 3d a week. The building was initially single-story but by 1936 another two floors had been added and by then the building had an auditorium, dance floor, reading room, library, ladies room and rehearsal rooms for local societies. Programmes from the time included Tea Dances, snooker/billiards, reading groups, rehearsals and union meetings for local miners.

With the decline of the mining industry the building fell into disrepair throughout the 1970s and 1980s and ownership was handed to Islwyn Borough Council with the mandate to make it available for community use.

The building was formally re-opened in February 1992 by Lynne Vaughan, who was Theatre Manager between September 1991 and June 1995. Funded by Islwyn Borough Council and the Welsh Office, it has given local dramatic societies the opportunity to perform on the same stage as Jasper Carrot, Ken Dodd and Welsh National Opera.

== Christianity ==
The 1904–1905 Welsh Revival, and the prominence of Christianity in the culture of Blackwood and the surrounding villages, have left the town with a large number of active and disused churches and chapels. Former places of worship include the Libanus Chapel (1829), converted to a community hub; the Jerusalem Independent Chapel (1840), converted to dwellings; and a Methodist chapel (1904) which serves as Blackwood Little Theatre. Non-conformist churches include Mount Pleasant Baptist Church on Cefn Road, Blackwood Methodist Church, Blackwood Vineyard Church and Blackwood Pentecostal (Pentecostal Movement)

Anglican churches include St. Margaret's (Church in Wales), located at the top of the High Street. There is a Roman Catholic church, Sacred Heart, in nearby Pontllanfraith.

The Boys' Brigade and Girls' Brigade are in Blackwood with companies meeting at the Baptist and Methodist churches. There is also a number of other Christian youth groups.

== Education ==
There is a network of primary schools, junior schools and secondary schools. The town is provided for by two local comprehensive schools all with between 800 – 1200 pupils. The Secondary schools are Blackwood Comprehensive School and Islwyn High School. Until the mid-1990s Blackwood comprehensive had separate uniforms for senior and junior pupils. A number of Blackwood pupils have been to Oxbridge and to other leading educational institutions.

An increase in demand for Welsh language medium education has led to the establishment of two Welsh Medium Infants and Primary schools. Ysgol Trelyn is located in the community of Pengam to the west of Blackwood and the newly opened Ysgol Cwm Derwen is located in the village of Oakdale to the east of the town. Both schools are 'feeder' schools to the Secondary School Ysgol Gyfun Cwm Rhymni located in Fleur de Lys, a village adjacent to Pengam to the west of Blackwood.

== Transport ==
Blackwood is in the middle of the Sirhowy Valley, the source of the river near Tredegar to the North and the confluence with the River Ebbw to the South. The main road to Blackwood and for traffic heading North or South was through Blackwood High Street (B4521) until the Sirhowy Enterprise Way was opened in 2005. Sirhowy Enterprise Way was 4.3 km of new single carriageway roads following the former Penar Branch railway line (closed 1989) on the eastern side of the valley, connected by the Chartist Bridge to the North and a bridge linking Woodfieldside to Blackwood in the south. The new roads which link to the A472 and the A467 provide links with Newport and other major towns and have closed off local roads such as the 1 in 4 incline of the Rhiw.

Blackwood has no heavy or light rail links; local bus services run between Blackwood Bus Station and Ystrad Mynach with a link to Transport for Wales' Rhymney Line. Blackwood appears in the preliminary South Wales Metro plan published by Transport for Wales as being a possible extension to the rail links. The Sirhowy Tramroad, which was constructed in 1797, ran through what is now High Street. The tramroad was converted to a standard-gauge railway in 1860 and was taken over by the London and North Western Railway (LNWR) in 1876 which was incorporated into the London, Midland and Scottish Railway (LMS) in 1923. Passenger services ran from June 1865 until June 1960. Mineral traffic to coal yards at Blackwood & Tredegar continued until April 1969 with track lifted the following year. Some evidence of the railway still exists such as the underpass at Cwmgelli, most of the line is now a cycle path. The site of Blackwood railway station is now occupied by KFC.

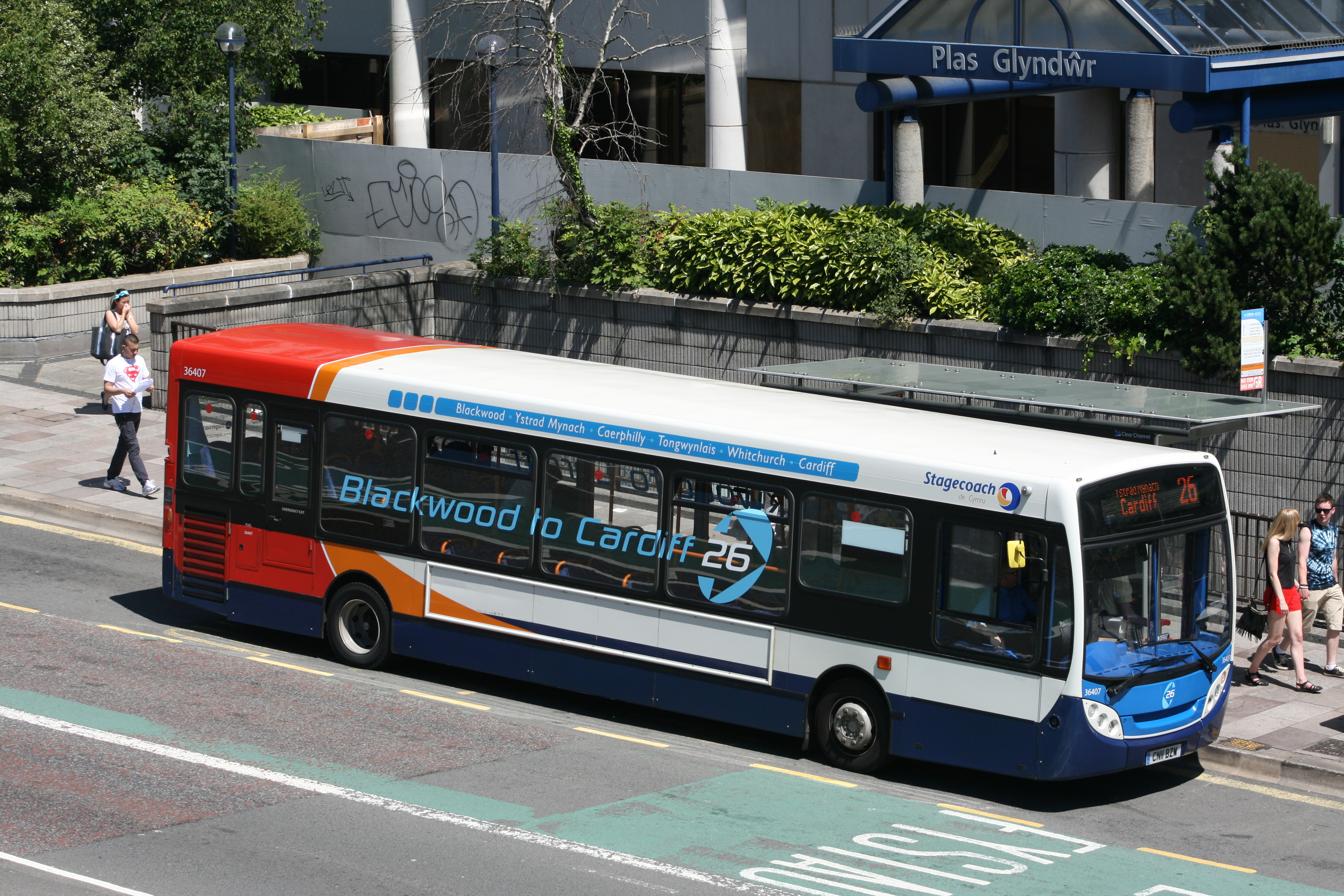
The Blackwood to Cardiff Stagecoach service

The town has since been served by buses. There were two major companies in the Eastern and Central Valleys, namely:

- Red & White, which covered the western Sirhowy valleys and Newport area. Red & White was started in post World War I, they served many areas of South Wales and Gloucestershire. After privatisation the company was broken up, part became Stagecoach Red & White and the company is now known as Stagecoach South Wales.
- Western Welsh: a company nationalised in 1969.

Red & White and Western Welsh merged to become National Welsh in 1978, which was privatised in 1987. Its operations were acquired by Stagecoach in South Wales in 1992 after entering administration.

Other operators have included:

- IBT – Islwyn Borough Transport: IBT (originally established in 1926 as the West Monmouthshire Omnibus Board) was the former municipal operator and served routes in the Islwyn Borough Area (Bedwellty and Mynyddislwyn) with the main depot next to St Margaret's Church, Blackwood. Later moving to a new depot on Penmaen Road, Pontllanfraith; a depot that is still occupied by IBT's successor organisation. Following deregulation, its IBT traded as an arms' length operation of Caerphilly County Borough Council. Its distinctive blue and white livery was transferred from its Leyland Tiger and Leyland Leopard buses (which were a common sight until the early 21st Century) to their low floor fleet. However, in late 2009 Caerphilly resolved to sell IBT to Stagecoach in South Wales. The sale was approved by the Office of Fair Trading and took place on 12 January 2010.
- Harris Coaches Pengam Ltd: a bus and coach operator established in 1921 runs services throughout the South Wales valleys.
- Glyn Williams: Glyn Williams sold out to Stagecoach in 2005.

== Rotary ==
The Rotary Club of Blackwood was formed in 1946 and currently has twenty members. Membership is open to both men and women, although as at July 2022 there are no women members. The Club meets every Tuesday at the Maes Manor Hotel and is active in the local community. The Club raises funds for various charities and supports extracurricular activities in local schools.

Every Christmas, club members can be found at the entrance to the town's Asda store, with a miniature nativity scene, raising funds that the Club donates to local charities. During the Covid 19 lockdowns the club ceased to meet in person but still managed to raise charitable funds via social media. Amongst its many projects, it supported a local foodbank, something that continues. Additionally one club member completed a virtual walk from Land's End to John O Groats, raising over £4,000.00 for the cancer breast care unit at Ystrad Mynach hospital.

The club's 2022 president is Allan Sharpe, a retired pharmacist.

== Political representation ==
Blackwood is currently represented on Caerphilly County Borough Council by three Independent councillors: Kevin Etheridge, Andrew Farina-Childs and Nigel Dix.

== Notable people ==
See also Category:People from Blackwood, Caerphilly

- David Alexander – singer and entertainer
- Paul Barrett – rock and roll agent, promoter, and former manager of Shakin' Stevens
- James Dean Bradfield – musician
- Siobhan Dowd – author
- Richey Edwards – musician
- Sam Gardiner – Irish politician
- Sali Hughes – journalist
- Evan James – writer and composer of the Welsh National Anthem
- Neil Kinnock – politician and former leader of the Labour Party; former Member of Parliament for Islwyn (formerly Bedwellty).
- Alun Lewis – rugby player
- Sean Moore – musician
- Alun Pask – rugby player
- Margaret Price – opera singer
- Steve Strange – Welsh pop singer
- Dan Thomas – politician and leader of Reform UK Wales; former leader of Barnet London Borough Council
- Nicky Wire – musician
