= Pontllanfraith Low Level railway station =

Disused railway station in Pontllanfraith, Caerphilly

Pontllanfraith Low Level
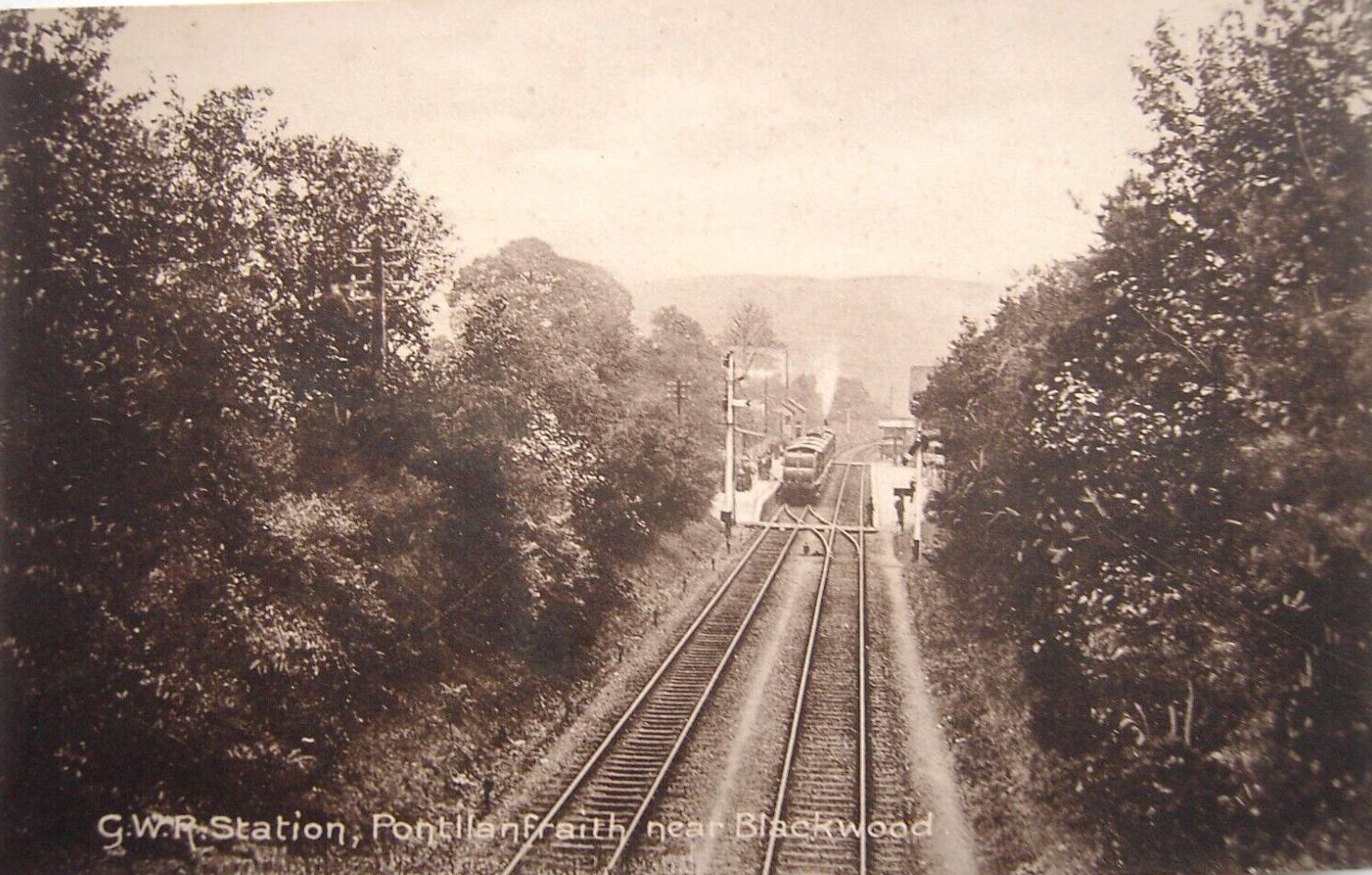

General information
- Location: Pontllanfraith, Monmouthshire; Wales
- Coordinates: 51.6548°N 3.1888°W
- Grid reference: ST178957
- Platforms: 2

Other information
- Status: Disused

History
- Original company: Newport, Abergavenny and Hereford Railway
- Pre-grouping: Great Western Railway
- Post-grouping: Great Western Railway

Key dates
- 25 May 1857: Opened as Tredegar Junction
- 1 May 1905: Name changed to Pontllanfraith
- 19 July 1950: Name changed to Pontllanfraith Low Level
- 15 June 1964: Closed
Location

Pontllanfraith Low Level railway station served the village of Pontllanfraith, historically in Monmouthshire, Wales, from 1857 to 1964 on the Newport, Abergavenny and Hereford Railway.

== History ==
The station was opened as Tredegar Junction on 25 May 1857 by the Newport, Abergavenny and Hereford Railway. An excursion ran on 1 June 1857, which carried 15000 people and travelled to South Wales. Its name was changed to Pontllanfraith on 1 May 1905 and changed again to Pontllanfraith Low Level on 19 July 1950. It closed on 15 June 1964.

Preceding station	Disused railways	Following station
Penar Junction Halt; Line and station closed	Newport, Abergavenny and Hereford Railway	Hengoed High Level; Line and station closed
