= Gelligroes Mill =

Gelli-groes Mill
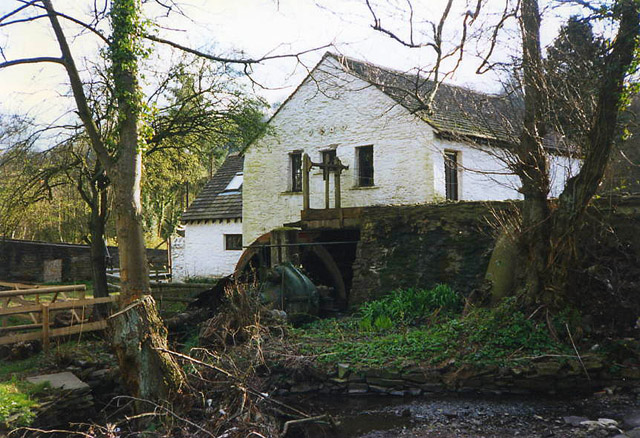

- Location within Caerphilly
- 51.6452°N 3.1896°W
- Type: Mill
- Location: Caerphilly, Wales
- OS grid reference: ST 1778 9471

History
- Built: early 17th century

Listed Building – Grade II*
- Official name: Gelli-groes Mill
- Designated: 25 May 1962
- Reference no.: 1880
- Community: Pontllanfraith

Gelligroes Mill is a water-powered corn mill in Pontllanfraith, Caerphilly county borough, South Wales, designated as a Grade II* listed building in 1962.

The mill is equipped with an overshot wheel with a cast iron frame and wooden buckets. When fully operational, it contained two pairs of rotating stones to grind barley and wheat. It was built around 1625 and was much altered during its working life. It is believed to have been the last mill operating commercially in Monmouthshire, eventually falling into disuse in the late 1980s.

As mining developed and farming declined, the business adapted to changing needs. In 1874 the owners became suppliers of seed and animal feed to smallholders, and in the 1900s Artie Moore and his brother, who were local technological pioneers, installed a generator powered by the mill wheel to charge batteries for farmers in advance of the extension of mains electricity to the area.

Moore's self-built Wireless receiver at the mill picked up the Italian government's declaration of war on Libya in 1911 and RMS Titanic's distress call in 1912.

As of 2000, the mill is occupied by royal candlemaker David Constable.
