= Oakdale Colliery =

Coal mine in Wales

Coordinates: 51°40′53″N 3°10′51″W

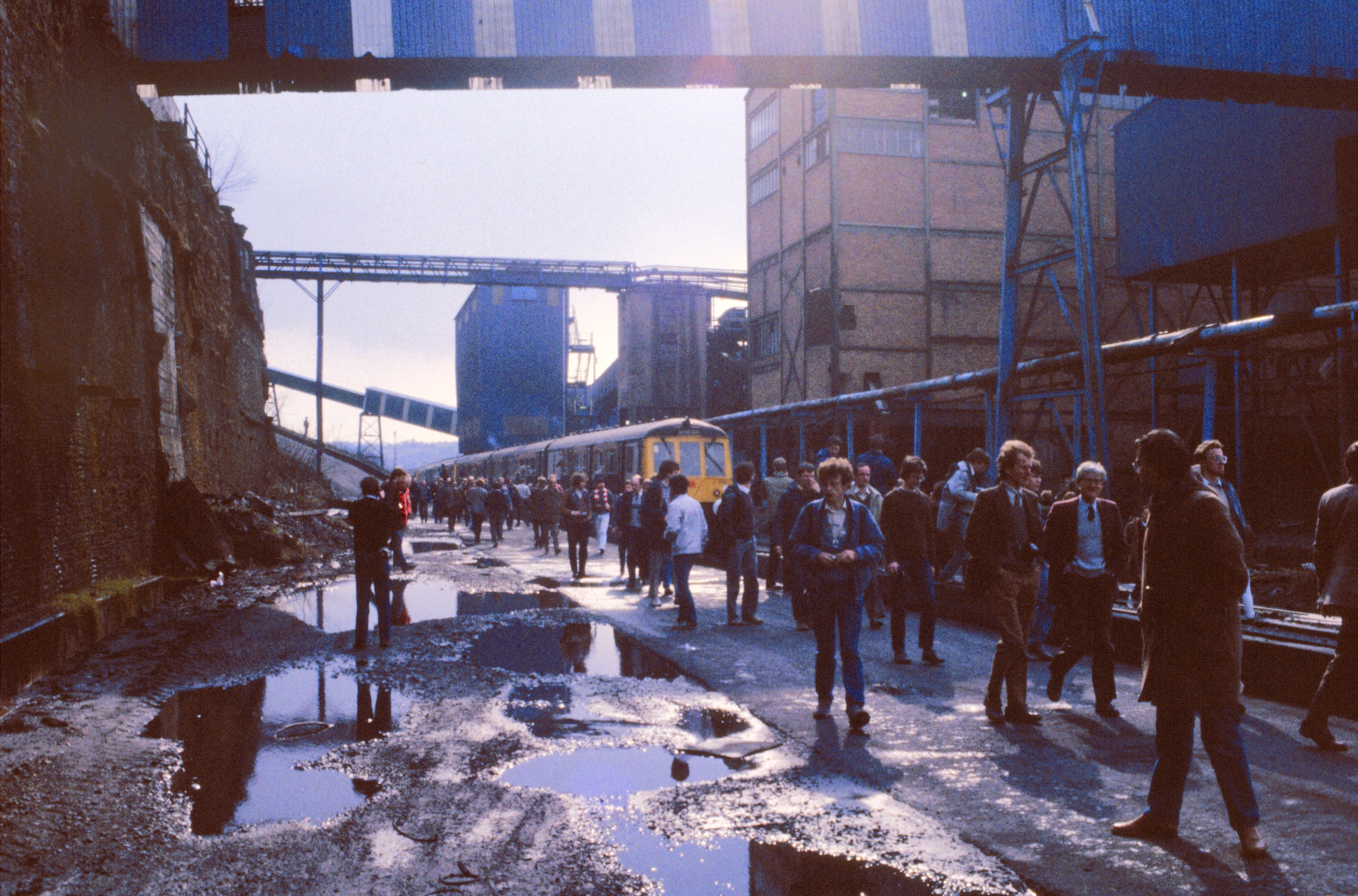
Visitors at Oakdale Colliery seen during a railtour in April 1986

Oakdale Colliery was a coal mine located in the Sirhowy Valley, one of the valleys of South Wales.

In the early years of the twentieth century the need for coal was growing both in America and Europe, and local business men in Wales were looking for new opportunities to fill the demand.

Among these were a group known as the Tredegar Iron and Coal Company, made up of wealthy industrialists from the Maclaren, Markham, Pochin, Whitworth and Wyllie families. They decided to create a group of collieries in the Sirhowy Valley, which explorations had told them contained rich seams of " black gold." One of these was at the small rural hamlet of Rhiw Syr Dafydd.

Work began clearing the site for the new colliery at Ty Mellyn, Oakdale, with the sinking of the pit in 1907. Waterloo shaft followed in 1911.

The shafts, North (upcast), and South, were 626 and 650 yards deep respectively, and were the largest diameter shafts in South Wales at the time.

Opened in 1911, the colliery was owned by the Oakdale Navigation Collieries Ltd, a subsidiary of the Tredegar Iron Company. At its peak in 1938 it employed a workforce of 2,235, when production reached one million tons per year.

Oakdale was linked to Markham colliery and the Celynen North colliery in Newbridge in the late 1970s and early 1980s, making it the largest colliery in Gwent.

The pit closed in 1989 and the tips have now been landscaped and converted into platforms for industrial development.

The former site of Oakdale Colliery now sites Islwyn High School, which opened in 2016 to former students from Oakdale Comprehensive School, Pontllanfraith Comprehensive School and Cwmcarn Comprehensive School. Of the three, the Pontllanfraith school is the only one still standing, with no obvious plans in sight.

== See also ==
- Oakdale, Caerphilly
- Oakdale Hospital
