= Sirhowy River =

River in Wales

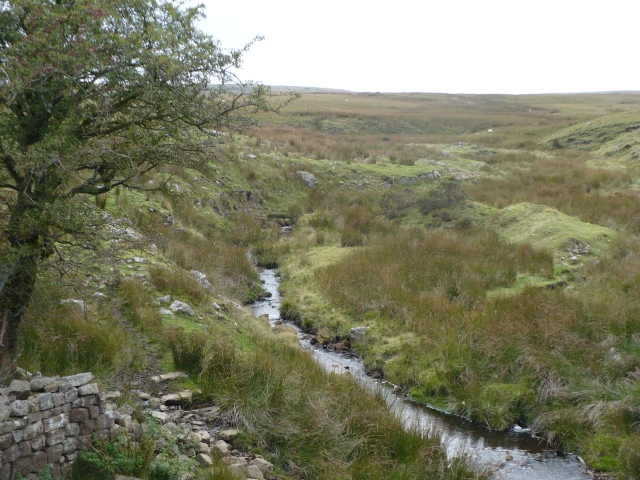
- The Sirhowy River near its source where it passes under the road to Trefil
- Native name: Afon Sirhywi (Welsh)

Location
- Sovereign state: United Kingdom
- Country: Wales
- Principal areas: Blaenau Gwent; Caerphilly

Physical characteristics
- Source
  - location: Cefn Pyllau-duon, Tredegar
  - coordinates: 51.799°N 3.292°W
- Mouth: Confluence with Ebbw River
  - location: Crosskeys
  - coordinates: 51.6152°N 3.1241°W

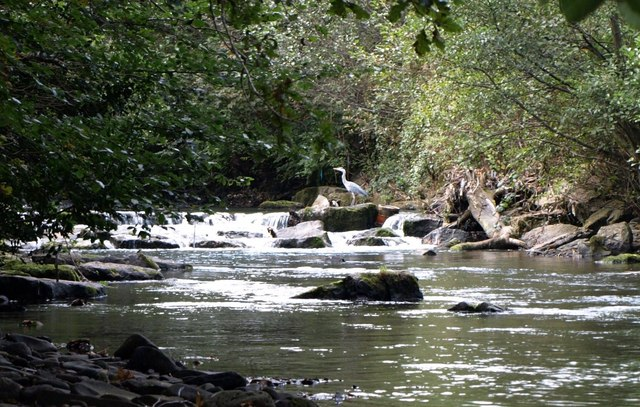
The Sirhowy River near Wattsville

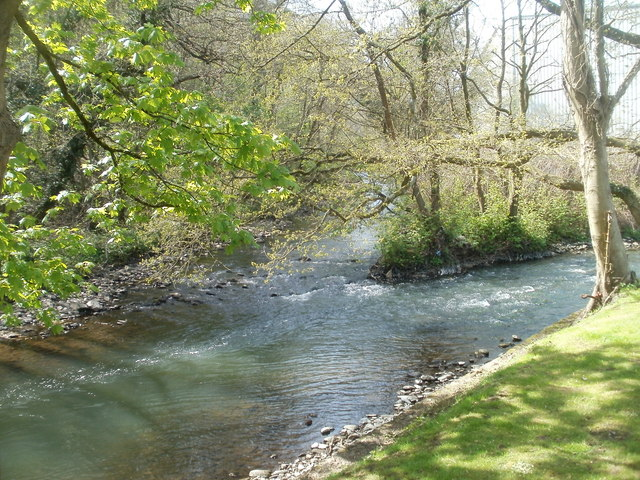
The confluence of the Sirhowy River and the Ebbw river at Crosskeys

Sirhowy River (Welsh: Afon Sirhywi) is a river that runs through the South Wales Coalfield in South East Wales. Its source lies at approximately 1,500 feet above sea level on the slopes of the broad and barren plateau of Cefn Pyllau-duon above the town of Tredegar, which separates it from the Rhymney River in the west. The area is one of the Heads of the Valleys, the latter of which local historian Oliver Jones (1969) described in his 1969 book The early days of Sirhowy and Tredegar as 'a series of parallel valleys, each drained by the little river from which it got its name.' Jones correspondingly observed that the Sirhowy river gave its name to the Sirhowy Valley.

Around 1676, William Morgan (of Machen and Tredegar) married Elizabeth Dayrell, the daughter of Edward Lewis of Bletchingdon, Oxfordshire, and the widow of Sir Francis Dayrell. With her huge dowry, Morgan bought land in Bedwellty, which became known as the Bedwellty Estate, through which the Sirhowy River flowed. Welsh scholar and Anglican priest E. T. Davies (1965) observed that, with the local 'abundance of iron-ore, outcrop coal ... and supplies of limestone', the water power which the river provided 'saw the establishment of the new iron industry between 1757 and 1800. Later, local historian Roger Phillips (1990), a former tenant of the Tredegar Estate, observed that the river shared 'in the lucrative exploitation of the mineral resources in the northern part of the county.'

== Name ==
Oliver Jones discussed the toponymy of Sirhowy in detail. He observed:

At different times the name has been rendered as Sirhowey, Sirowi, Sroway and Sirowy, all of which stem from the poets, lease-writers and map-makers of the past. The uncertainty of its spelling is clearly shown as early as 1590 in an old document connected with the Manor of Abercarn in which reference is made to "the land called Rue Cam y Boulthe in the place called Glynne Sirowy on the east side of the stream called Sirowye. ... "Sirhowy" in the opinion of Eiddil Gwent, the first of our local historians, is derived from Siriol Gwy, "siriol" meaning pleasant or charming and "gwy" an old Welsh word for water – the name meaning Pleasant Water.

Archdeacon William Coxe cited Sorwy six times in his 1801 book Historical Tour of Monmouthshire. For example, in his last citation he referred to 'the banks of the Sorwy'. In keeping with Coxe, Jones observed that, 'References taken from many sources show [the original name] to be Sorwy'. However, he also observed that 'many different spellings' existed, which he attributed to the English writers who had difficulties in pronouncing the name.

In common with the names of the nearby Rhymney River to the west of it and the Ebbw River, into which it flows, the name for the Sirhowy River is in a reverse order to the names of rivers that are close to it, such as, for example, the River Taff which is to the west of it and the River Usk which is to the east of it.

== Course ==
Sirhowy River is approximately 19 miles long. Initially it flows into the Siôn-Sieffre Reservoir in Trefil, after which it turns south through Tredegar into the town of Blackwood and the village of Pontllanfraith. The river then turns eastwards below the village of Cwmfelinfach. Finally, it flows past the village of Wattsville before it joins the Ebbw River below the village of Crosskeys, where it loses its identity. The river has a catchment area of 76.1 km.

== Water quality in the 19th century ==
Oliver Jones observed that, in Tredegar in the 1820s:

‘Water for domestic purposes had to be carried from the nearest stream or from one of the spouts around the district. These spouts tapped a head of water which collected behind a bank of earth or a wall – hence Spout Row, the name given to the first houses in the Park Hill area where one of these old spouts is still in existence. … In matters of sanitation the town was no worse – or better – than the others along the Iron Belt. Very few privies existed, whole rows being without one. Buckets, kept in a “cwtch” outside the back door, had to serve, the contents of which were disposed of on the nearest garbage heap or buried in gardens used over and over again for the same purpose. Heavy rains invariably caused floodings in certain areas but little could be done and the water was left to seep away in the gutters it cut for itself.’

In 1896 the UK Government Local Government Board, the forerunner of the Ministry of Health, ordered Medical Inspector Mr Thomas William Thompson, D.P.H. to 'ascertain precisely what was the state, as regards drainage and sewerage, of the several districts comprised within [the valleys of the Rumney, Sirhowy, Ebbw Fawr, Ebbw Fach, Ebbw, and the Afon Llwyd rivers, in the counties of Monmouth and Glamorgan], and for the purpose of acquiring further information as to the best means of remedying defects of sewerage and sewage disposal which had, from time to time, been brought under the notice of the Board.’ Thompson reported as follows:

'Sewage Pollution. – The most serious pollution of the Sirhowy river by sewage is that which occurs in the urban district of Tredegar, where the slop sewage of a population of some 18,000 persons, and a considerable share of their excremental sewage, are poured, without any attempt at purification, into the stream. Lower down, the river also receives, either directly or indirectly through tributary streams, most of the crude slop sewage of the villages of Hollybush, Argoed, and Blackwood, in the Bedwellty Urban District, and some of the slop sewage from various villages and scattered groups of dwellings in the St. Mellons Rural District, especially Cwmcorrwg, Woodfield, Gelligroes, and Pont Llanfraith, though in this district some attempt has been made to limit pollution of the river by the use of cesspools for the disposal of slop sewage.
Trade pollution. – There are no tin-plate works in this valley, or other works likely to cause serious chemical solution. Coal-washing is practised at Tytrist and Sirhowy Collieries in the Tredegar Urban District. At the former the Belgian process is in use, at the latter a less efficient method.'

== Protection ==
Sirhowy River is protected by Natural Resources Wales and the South East Wales Rivers Trust, which is a member of The Rivers Trust.
