= Oakdale Comprehensive School =

Location
- Caerphilly; Wales; 51.674255°N 3.185402°W

Information
- Type: 11-16 Comprehensive school, former Secondary Modern
- Established: 1968
- Status: Closed
- Closed: 2016
- Authority: Caerphilly County Borough
- Department for Education URN: 401833 Tables
- Enrollment: 350

Oakdale Comprehensive School was a comprehensive school located in the village of Oakdale, Caerphilly Oakdale in Caerphilly county, Wales. The total enrollment was about 660 pupils aged 11 to 16. Sixth-form provision was at Coleg Gwent in Crosskeys and Ystrad Mynach College.

== History ==
The school opened in 1968 as a Secondary Modern School catering for 350 pupils and closed in 2016. Pupils from Oakdale and Pontllanfraith Comprehensives transferred into Islwyn High School. The school's closed in 2016 as a result of the 21st Century Schools Project in Wales.

The school experienced difficult times, however, under the leadership of Chris David, dramatic improvements were made in a short time period.

Information Technology training at Oakdale Comprehensive was commended by the Secretary of State for Wales, Paul Murphy at Welsh questions in the House of Commons in March 2009.

The school was run by a Senior Leadership Team consisting of Chris David (Headteacher), Martin Davis (Deputy Headteacher), Matthew Thomas (Assistant Headteacher) and Emma Paskell (Bursar). The headteacher retired before the opening of Islwyn High but other senior leaders continued with their roles at the new school.

== Notable former pupils ==
- Joe Calzaghe - World super-middleweight boxing champion
- Nicky Wire, James Dean Bradfield, Sean Moore and Richey James Edwards - of the rock band Manic Street Preachers
- Patrick Jones - poet, older brother of Nicky Wire
- Matthew Watkins - Newport Gwent Dragons and Wales centre
