= Pontllanfraith =

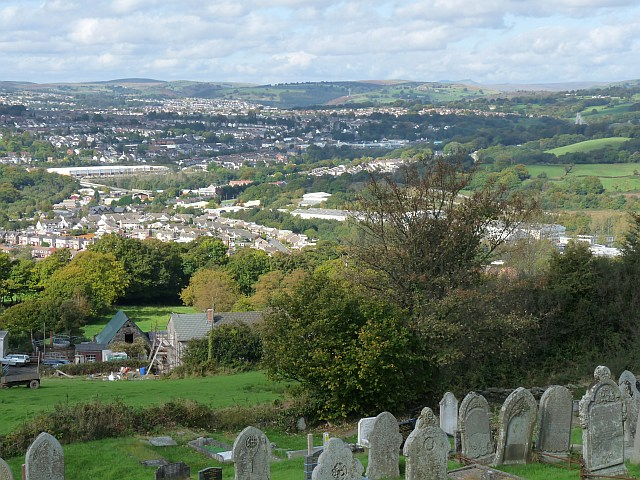
- The view from New Bethel Church, overlooking Pontllanfraith and Blackwood.

- Location within Caerphilly
- Population: 8,552 (2011)
- OS grid reference: ST181959
- Community: Pontllanfraith
- Principal area: Caerphilly
- Preserved county: Gwent
- Country: Wales
- Sovereign state: United Kingdom
- Post town: BLACKWOOD
- Postcode district: NP12
- Dialling code: 01495
- Police: Gwent
- Fire: South Wales
- Ambulance: Welsh
- UK Parliament: Caerphilly
- Senedd Cymru – Welsh Parliament: Blaenau Gwent Caerffili Rhymni
- List of places UK Wales Caerphilly 51.654°N 3.193°W Map of the community

Pontllanfraith (Welsh pronunciation: [ˌpɔntɬanˈvraiθ]) is a large village and community located in the Sirhowy Valley in Caerphilly County Borough, Wales, within the historic boundaries of Monmouthshire. It is situated adjacent to the town of Blackwood, with the Sirhowy River passing through both locations. The village includes the communities of the Penllwyn, Springfield and The Bryn. The population of the community at the 2011 census was 8,552.

== Etymology ==
The name of the village is a combination of pont "bridge" + llyn "lake" + fraith "speckled", "the bridge of the speckled lake". Although a masculine noun in Modern Welsh, llyn "lake" was feminine in the medieval language of the south, hence the mutated feminine form fraith, rather than unmutated masculine brith as would be found today. The word fraith probably refers to speckled sunlight on the water of a pool in the Sirhowy River.

The modern name acquired the change from llyn "lake" to llan "church", a common element in Welsh toponymy, somewhere around the eighteenth century and led to the belief that there was a saint called Braith, whose mutated form Fraith was similar to Ffraid, Welsh for Saint Brigid.

== History ==
The Penllwyn Manor, an old stone building which is now a public house, was originally part of the Tredegar Estate, and is believed to be the original home of the family of the pirate Henry Morgan.

In 1912, at the 17th-century mill in Gelligroes amateur wireless operator Artie Moore picked up a distress signal from the RMS Titanic using wireless receiving equipment.

Pontllanfraith was home to a Welsh coal mining community during the early to mid 20th century, providing homes for men working in a number of local pits such as Wyllie, Penallta, and Oakdale. In 1874 and 1875, Gelligroes Colliery was established, striking the Mynyddislwyn Red Ash vein, although the pits were later abandoned in 1875 due to water problems. In 1914, Lloyd's Navigation Steam Coal Co. Ltd. restarted work at the colliery, but World War I caused it to stop again. The colliery was abandoned for a second time in 1915. The colliery was used for a final time in 1917 after being acquired by the Tredegar Iron & Coal Co. Ltd., but was abandoned again in 1918.

== 2011 census ==
Following the 2011 census, Caerphilly County Borough Council published a profile for each ward. This profile covered population, age structure, economic activity and inactivity, ethnic groups, national identity, marital status, hours worked, car/van ownership, lone parents, health and provision of unpaid care, qualifications, household spaces and accommodation types, household tenure, industry of employment, household composition, occupation groups and knowledge of Welsh. Notable findings include:

- Out of the 8,552 residents, 4,230 were male and 4,322 were female.
- 30-44-year-olds were the largest age group, making up 19.5% of the total population.
- 99.1% of the population was white.
- 70.5% of males were economically active compared to 59.5% of females (aged 16–74).
- 80.6% identified as 'Welsh' whilst 22.6% identified as British (more than one option could be selected).
- 6,900 residents were aged 16+, with 48.3% being married.
- 76.8% of households owned at least one car/van.
- 68.7% of households were owner occupied.
- 85.9% of the population aged three and above had no knowledge of the Welsh language.

== Education ==
In 1926, Pontllanfraith Secondary School opened. In 1944, under the Tripartite System, it became Pontllanfraith Grammar School, and in 1959 it became Pontllanfraith Grammar Technical School (incorporating Pontllanfraith Technical School). In 1975, it became known as Pontllanfraith Comprehensive School, after incorporating Ynysddu Secondary Modern School (which existed from 1948 to 1975).

Pontllanfraith Comprehensive School closed in 2016. As part of the Welsh Government's 21st Century Schools Programme, Pontllanfraith Comprehensive School and Oakdale Comprehensive School were merged to form Islwyn High School. Due to construction being incomplete, pupils remained on the Pontllanfraith and Oakdale sites until 2017 before moving to the new building located on the former site of Oakdale Colliery. On 28 September 2017 the then First Minister Carwyn Jones officially opened Islwyn High School.

Pontllanfraith has several primary schools: Bryn Primary School, Penllwyn Primary School and Pontllanfraith Primary School.

== Governance ==
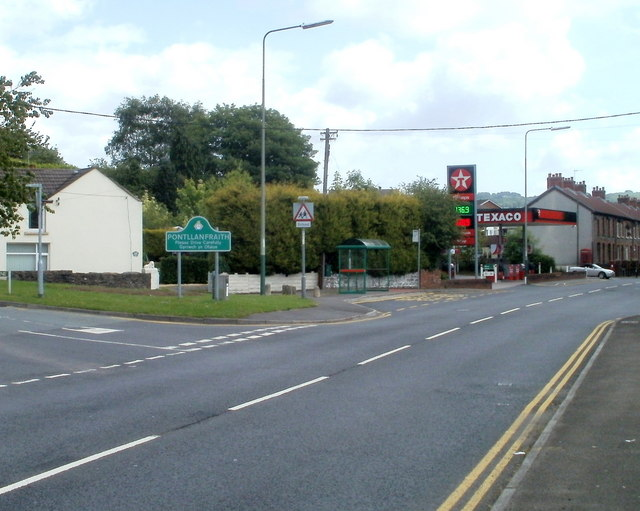
Southwest boundary of Pontllanfraith.

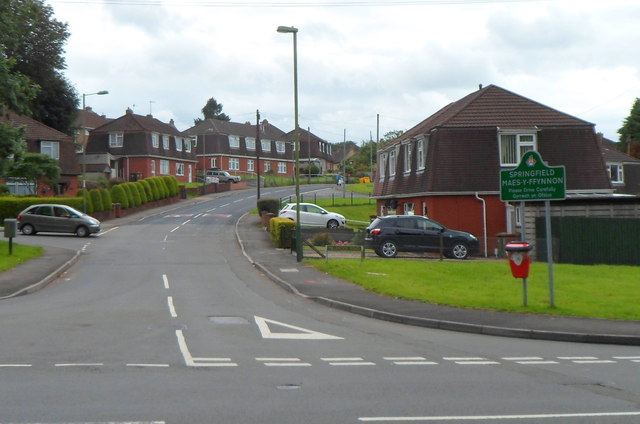
Northern boundary of Springfield.

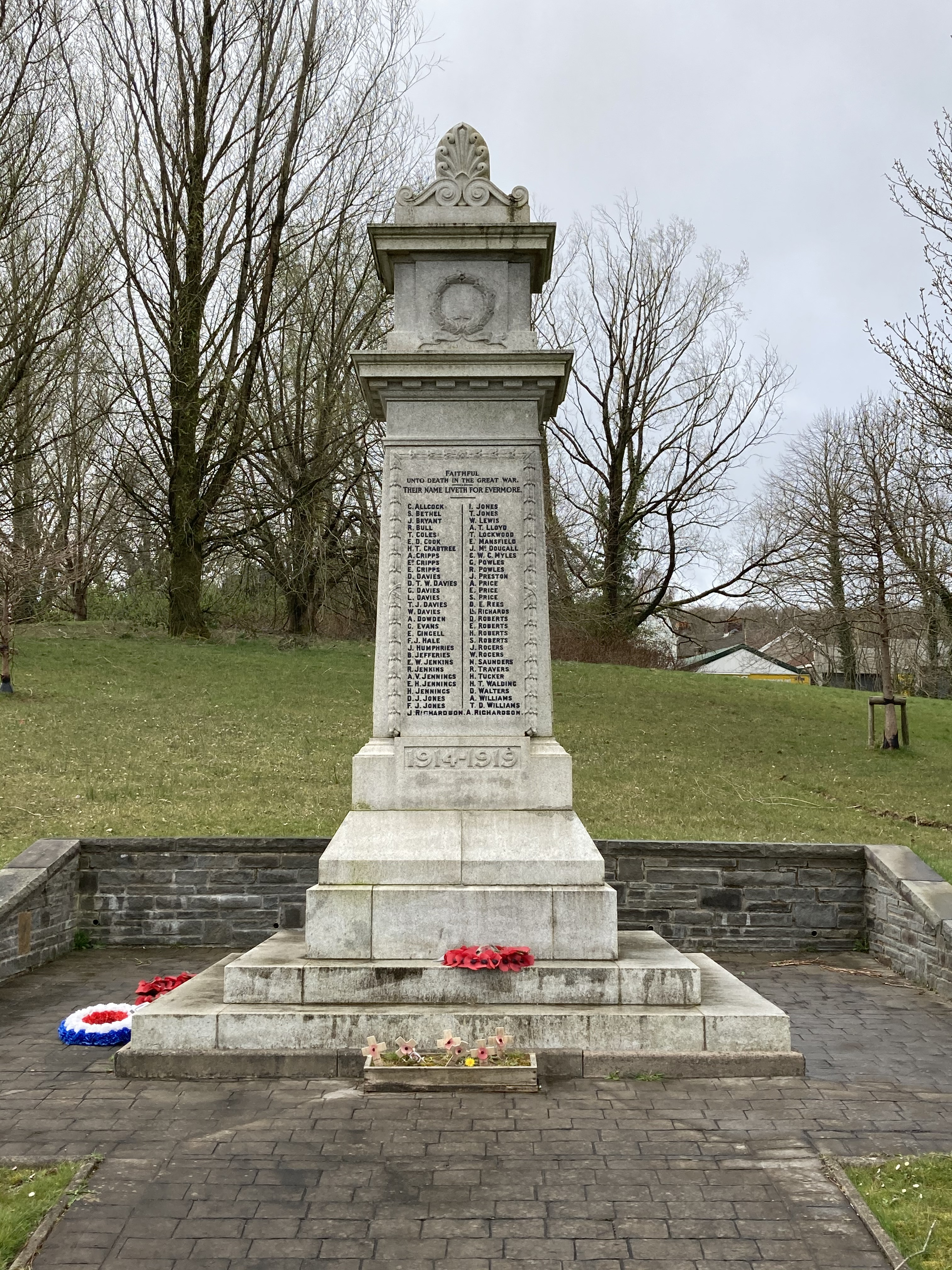
Pontllanfraith War Memorial.

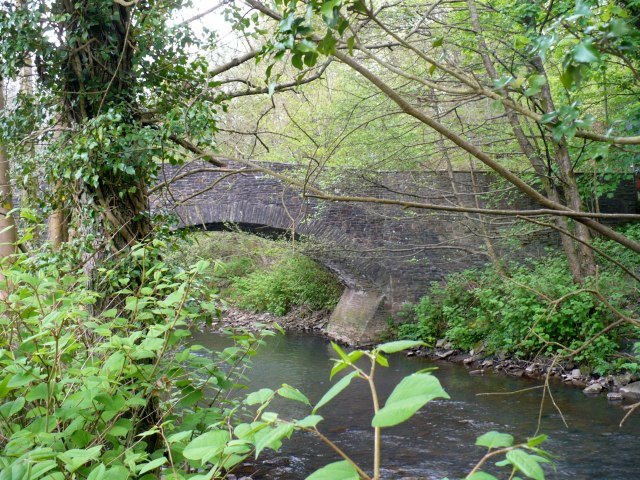
Gelligroes Bridge, over the Sirhowy River

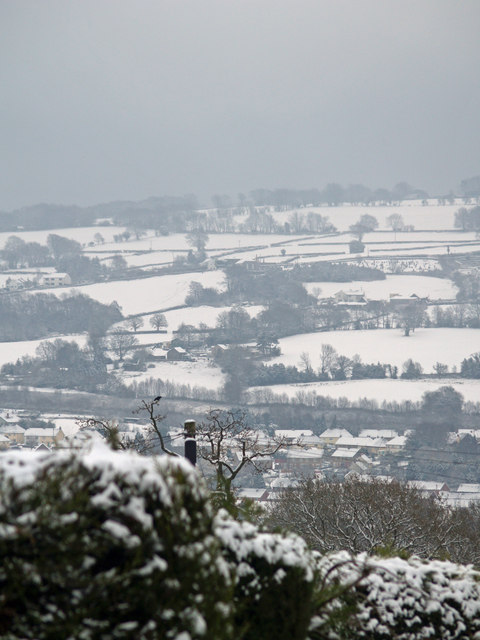
A snowy view over Mynyddislwyn.

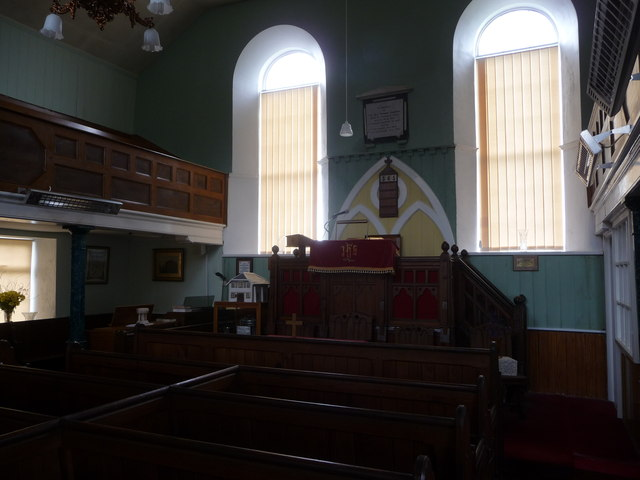
Interior of the New Bethel Chapel.

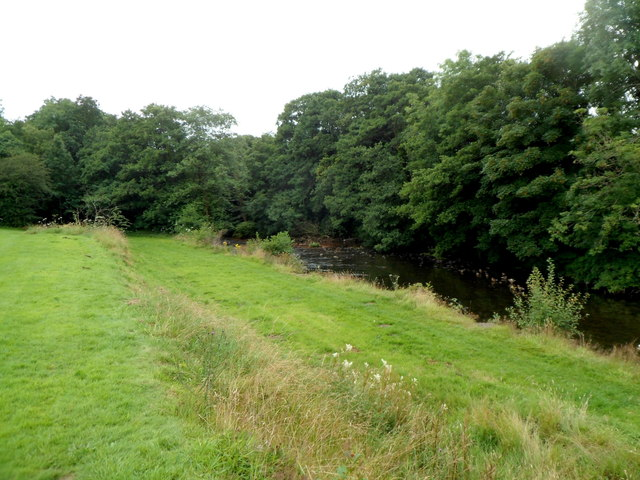
The east bank of the Sirhowy River.

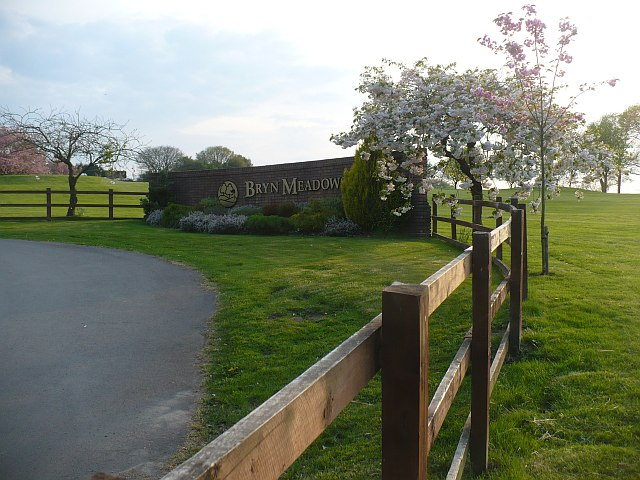
The entrance to Bryn Meadows Golf Hotel & Spa, situated between Pontllanfraith and Maesycwmmer.

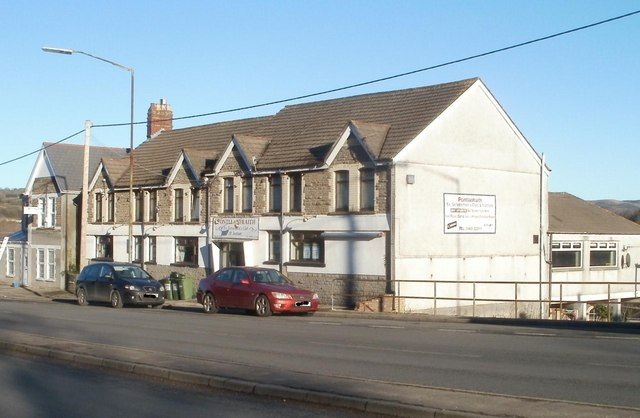
Pontllanfraith Ex Servicemen's Club & Institute.

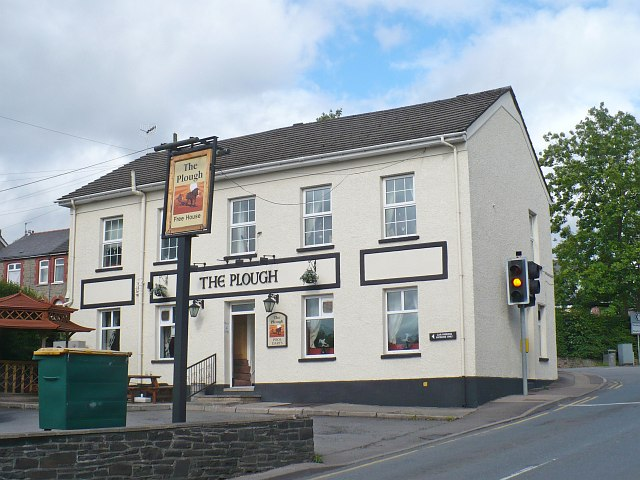
The Plough Inn.

Pontllanfraith is a Caerphilly County Borough Council ward, coterminous with the community, which elects three councillors to Caerphilly County Borough Council. The councillors cince May 2022 are Mike Adams, Patricia Cook and Colin Gordon.

=== Local election results ===
==== 2022 ====
2022, Electorate: 6416, Turnout: 30.99%
Candidate	Party	Votes	%	Notes
Mike Adams	Welsh Labour	1,045	19.98%	Elected
Cathrine Clark	Welsh Conservative Party	373	7.13%	
Pat Cook	Welsh Labour	926	17.7%	Elected
Colin John Gordon	Welsh Labour	815	15.58%	Elected
Jacob Pearce	Social Democratic Party Wales	210	4.01%	
Laura Jane Richards	Independent	782	14.95%	
James Freeman Wells	Independent	515	9.85%	
Roy Williams	Independent	565	10.8%	

==== 2017 ====
2017, Electorate: 6241, Turnout: 36.5%
Candidate	Party	Votes	%	Notes
Michael Adams	Welsh Labour	1,107	18.27%	Elected
Colin John Gordon	Welsh Labour	1,039	17.15%	Elected
Gez Kirby	Welsh Labour	966	15.95%	Elected
Jim Criddle	Plaid Cymru	773	12.76%	
Zoe Alexandra Hammond	Plaid Cymru	589	9.72%	
Andrew Williamson	Welsh Conservative Party	544	8.98%	
Wendy Phillips	Welsh Conservative Party	533	8.80%	
Mike Jackson	Plaid Cymru	507	8.37%	

==== 2012 ====
2012, Electorate: 6208, Turnout: 36.07%
Candidate	Party	Votes	%	Notes
Mike Adams	Welsh Labour	1,300	21.04	Elected
Jim Criddle	Plaid Cymru	563	9.11%	
John Evans	Welsh Conservative Party	227	3.67%	
Colin John Gordon	Welsh Labour	1,250	20.23%	Elected
Zoe Alexandra Hammond	Plaid Cymru	429	6.94%	
Winifred Margaret Jones	Welsh Conservative Party	203	3.29%	
Gez Kirby	Welsh Labour	1,158	18.74%	Elected
Anna Lewis	Independent	309	5%	
Jane Mclain	Welsh Conservative Party	205	3.32%	
Malcolm George Parker	Plaid Cymru	535	8.66%	

==== 2008 ====
2008, Electorate: 6300, Turnout: 36.2%
Candidate	Party	Votes	%	Notes
Jim Criddle	Plaid Cymru	984	14.22%	Elected
Malcolm Parker	Plaid Cymru	965	13.95%	Elected
Michael Adams	Welsh Labour	794	11.48%	Elected
Malcolm Pritchard	Plaid Cymru	776	11.22%	
Gwyn Price	Welsh Labour	748	10.81%	
Gerald Kirby	Welsh Labour	661	9.55%	
Teresa Etheridge	Independent	579	8.37%	
Ian Chivers	Welsh Conservative Party	325	4.7%	
Pat Lambeth	Independent	308	4.45%	
Jane McLain	Welsh Conservative Party	278	4.02%	
Phyllis Hunt	Welsh Conservative Party	265	3.83%	
Piers Langhelt	Independent	235	3.4%	

==== 2004 ====
2004, Electorate: 5940, Turnout: 36%
Candidate	Party	Votes	%	Notes
Malcolm Parker	Plaid Cymru	1,033	15.56%	Elected
Michael Adams	Welsh Labour	986	14.85%	Elected
Gwyn Price	Welsh Labour	904	13.62%	Elected
Malcolm Pritchard	Plaid Cymru	838	12.62%	
Ian Rogers	Welsh Labour	835	12.58%	
Gwenfron Williams	Plaid Cymru	760	11.45%	
Patricia Presley	Independent	636	9.58%	
Ian Chivers	Welsh Conservative Party	341	5.14%	
Jane McLain	Welsh Conservative Party	306	4.61%	

==== 1999 ====
1999, Electorate: 6285, Turnout: 40%
Candidate	Party	Votes	%	Notes
M. Parker	Plaid Cymru	1,908	22.56%	Elected
M. Pritchard	Plaid Cymru	1,561	18.46%	Elected
G. Williams	Plaid Cymru	1,493	17.65%	Elected
J. Morgan	Welsh Labour	1,161	13.73%	
R. Saralis	Welsh Labour	1,154	13.65%	
H. Moses	Welsh Labour	914	10.81%	
J. Shillito	Welsh Conservative Party	266	3.15%	

==== 1995 ====
1995, Electorate: 6202, Turnout: 39.3%
Candidate	Party	Votes	%	Notes
J. Morgan	Welsh Labour	1,652	19.8%	Elected
R. Saralis	Welsh Labour	1,615	19.35%	Elected
H. Moses	Welsh Labour	1,367	16.38%	Elected
M. Parker	Plaid Cymru	1,351	16.19%	
J. Richards	Plaid Cymru	1,175	14.08%	
A. Brookbanks	Plaid Cymru	916	10.98%	
D. Pitman	Welsh Conservative Party	151	1.81%	
J. Shillito	Welsh Conservative Party	118	1.41%	

=== Council offices ===
Caerphilly County Borough Council previously had offices at the building named Pontllanfraith House, although they have now been demolished. The land has since been sold to a property developer and construction of a new housing estate has begun. This was regarded as a controversial move, both prior to and following the demolition of Pontllanfraith House, with councilors raising concerns about affordable housing for the existing population.

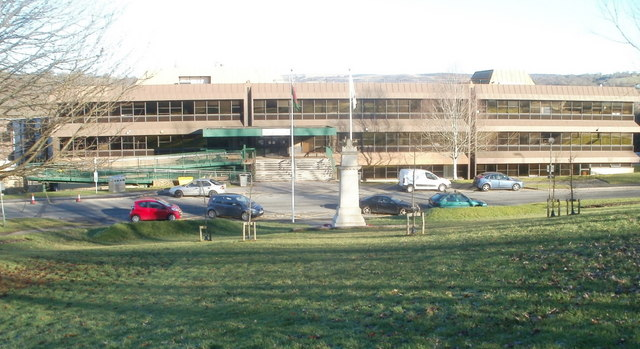
The now-demolished Pontllanfraith House, with the War Memorial also in view (2011)

== Transport ==
Pontllanfraith Low Level was a passenger station on the Taff Vale Extension of the Newport, Abergavenny and Hereford Railway. Originally named Tredegar Junction, opened in 1857, it was renamed to Pontllanfraith in 1905, and then to Pontllanfraith Low Level in 1950. The various junctions around the station gave it access to both the Rhymney Railway and the Rumney Railway. The railway closed to most freight traffic on 9 June 1958, and the station was later closed on 15 June 1964.

Pontllanfraith is served by the following bus routes:

- 5 – Blackwood – Pant Estate (Stagecoach South Wales)
- 6 – Blackwood – Wyllie (Harris Coaches)
- 7 – Blackwood – Pontypridd (Harris Coaches)
- 9 – Blackwood – Penllwyn (Harris Coaches)
- 11 – Blackwood – Gelligaer (Harris Coaches)
- 26 – Blackwood – Cardiff (Stagecoach South Wales)
- 52 – Blackwood – Abertillery (Stagecoach South Wales)
- 56 – Tredegar – Newport (Stagecoach South Wales)
- 96 – Crosskeys – Tredegar (Stagecoach South Wales)
- 151 – Blackwood – Newport (Stagecoach South Wales)
- 901 – Blackwood – Ystrad Mynach Station (Adventure Travel)

The 26 and 151 services are run by Stagecoach Gold, and the 901 is a rail linc service.

== Health ==
Pontllanfraith is under the jurisdiction of the Aneurin Bevan University Health Board. Blackwood Medical Group, an approved training practice, runs two centres – Avicenna Medical Centre and Oakdale Medical Centre, with the former being situated in Pontllanfraith. Pontllanfraith Medical Centre is located on the same site and is contracted to provide core services such as immunisations, child health surveillance and limited minor surgery procedures alongside a number of additional services. Pontllanfraith Pharmacy, an independent NHS Community Pharmacy, is situated adjacent to Pontllanfraith Medical Centre.

== Sport ==
Pontllanfraith Rugby Football Club run a number of teams, with the first fifteen playing their home matches at Islwyn Park. The club has been in existence for many years and the first entry on the captain's board relates to the season 1958–59. Ponllanfraith Diamonds Cycle Club founded by Roland Morgan in 1958, which spawned a number of successful cyclists until it disbanded in 1968. Pontllanfraith A.F.C. was a football club which operated from 1947 until 1992, when they merged with Fields Park Athletic A.F.C. to form Fields Park Pontllanfraith. The club was dissolved in 2005.

Pontllanfraith Leisure Centre is situated on the same site as the former comprehensive school. Although still operational, Caerphilly County Borough Council has expressed intentions of closing it to invest the £125,000 annual running cost elsewhere. In 2019, a High Court bid to overturn the council's planned closure succeeded under the principle of "public sector equality duty". However, in 2020, the Court of Appeal overturned the decision, and an appeal to the Supreme Court was rejected.

== Listed buildings ==
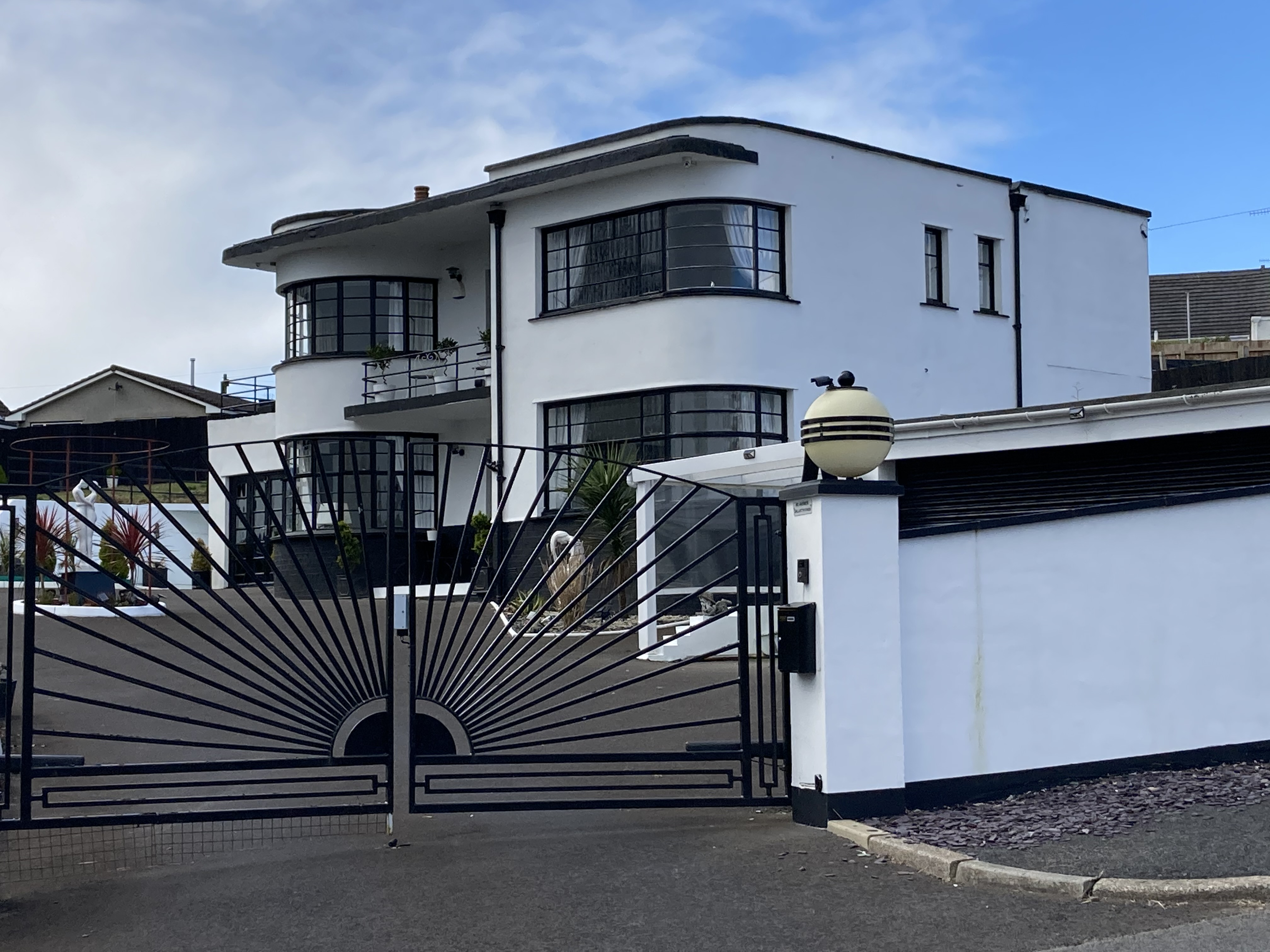
Shangri La

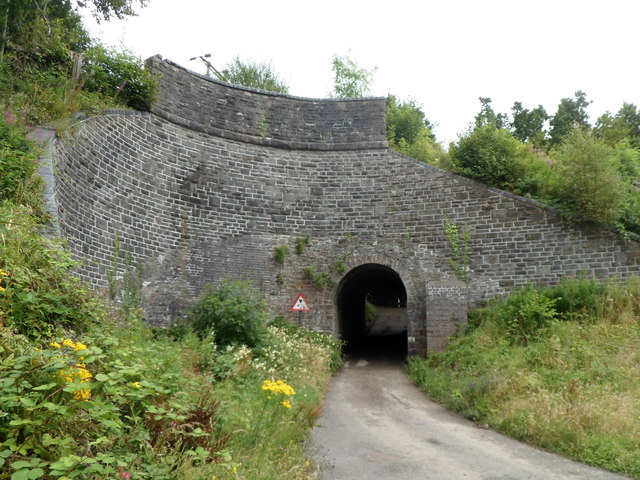
Former Tramroad Bridge

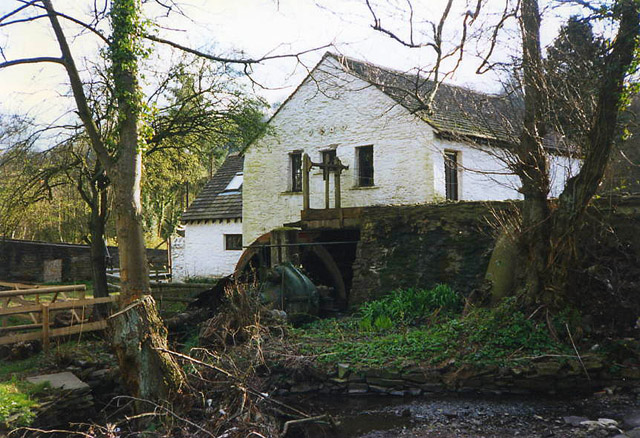
Gelligroes Mill

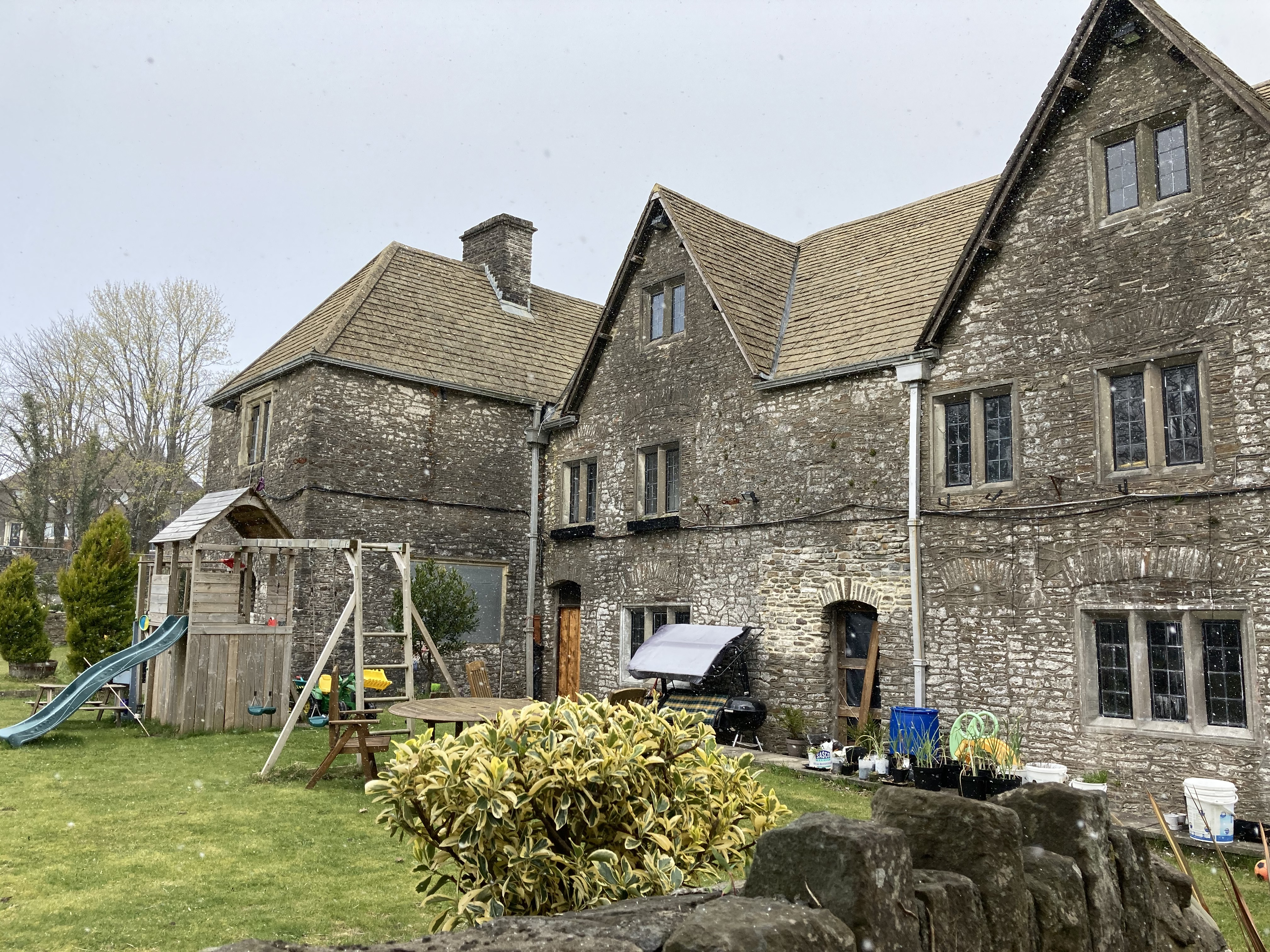
Penllwyn Manor

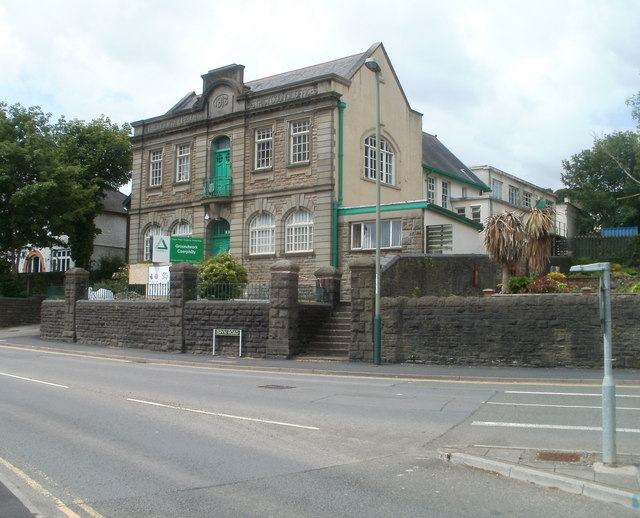
Former Mynyddislwyn Urban District Council Offices (now the Groundwork Wales office)

Pontllanfraith is home to two Grade II* listed structures; Gelligroes Mill and Penllwyn Manor. Both were listed on 25 May 1962. There are also a number of Grade II listed structures in Pontllanfraith:

- Bridge over Sirhowy River at Gelligroes
- Cwmbrynar aka Cwmbraenar Cottage
- Former Mynyddislwyn Urban District Council Offices (now the Groundwork Wales office)
- Garden Wall at Penllwyn
- Gelligroes Millhouse and attached Barn
- Heather Cottage
- Monument to Elizabeth Jones at New Bethel
- Monument to Margaret Williams at New Bethel
- Monument to Martha Williams at New Bethel
- Monument to Rosser Williams at New Bethel
- Monument to Thomas Henry Thomas at New Bethel
- Monuments to James Thomas and family at New Bethel
- New Bethel Chapel
- Nicholas monument at New Bethel
- Pair of chest tombs at Siloh Presbyterian Church
- Shangri La
- Siloh Presbyterian Church
- Stable range at Tyle-gwyn
- Tyle-gwyn
- Wall, railings and gates at New Bethel Chapel graveyard
- War Memorial
- Former Tramroad Bridge (partly in Pontllanfraith)

== Notable people ==
- James Dean Bradfield (born 1969), lead singer of the Manic Street Preachers.
- Julian Hodge (1904–2004), founder of the Bank of Wales.
- Neil Kinnock (born 1942), former Labour Party leader, MP, and Leader of the Opposition. Kinnock owned a house in Pontllanfraith.
- Roy Hughes (1925–2003), former MP and life peer. Hughes was born in Pontllanfraith.
- Artie Moore (1887–1949), wireless operator who received a distress message from the Titanic in the village.
- Liam Angel (born 1999), professional footballer who attended Pontllanfraith Comprehensive School.

== See also ==
- South Wales Valleys
- Mynyddislwyn
