= Castle House, Usk =

House in Usk, Monmouthshire, Wales

Castle House
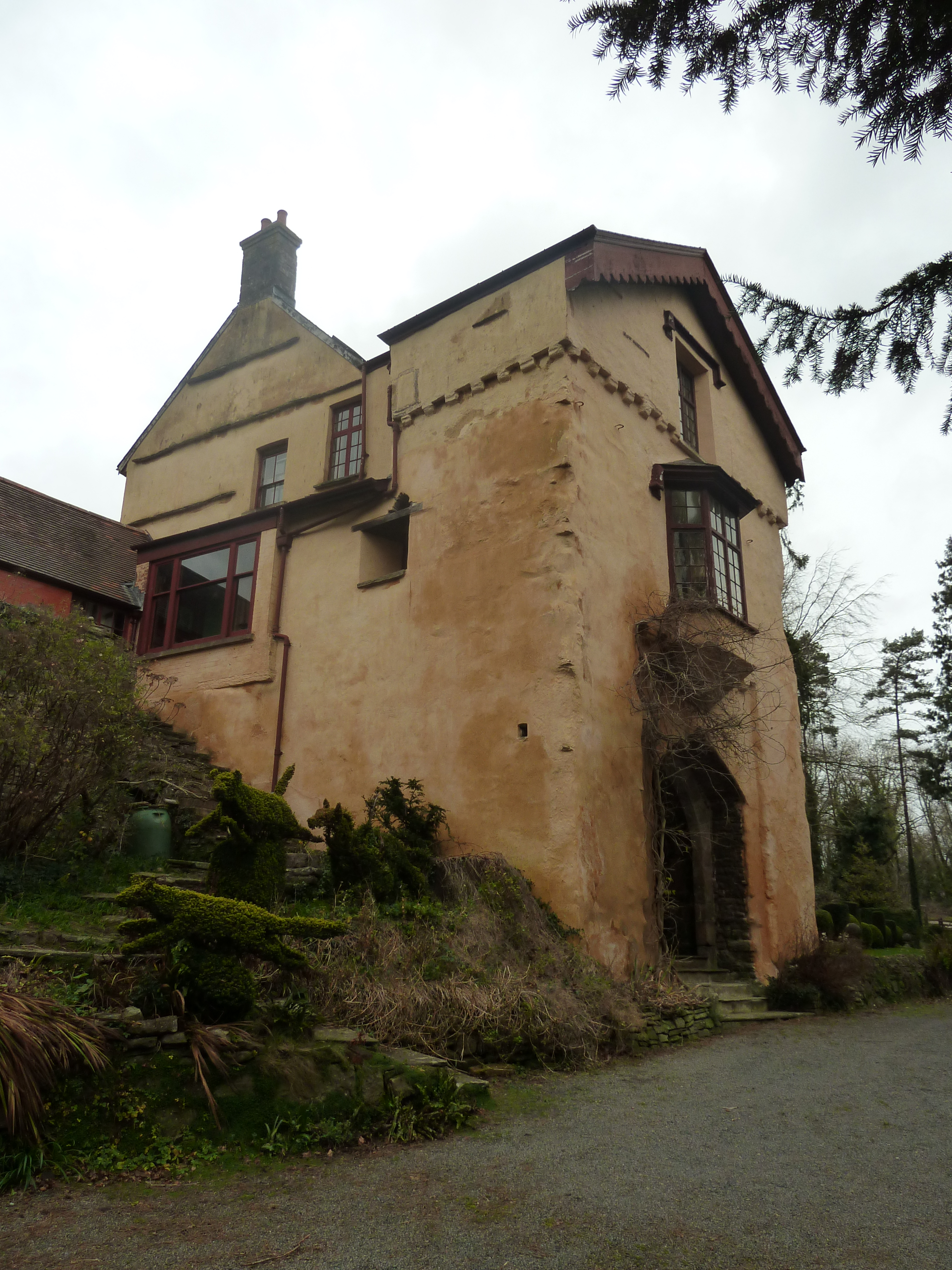
- "a major historic building"

- Location within Monmouthshire
- 51.7050°N 2.9022°W
- Type: House
- Location: Usk, Monmouthshire

History
- Built: Medieval to 19th century

Site notes
- Architectural style: Vernacular
- Governing body: Privately owned

Listed Building – Grade I
- Official name: Castle House
- Designated: 30 April 2004
- Reference no.: 2128

Castle House in Usk, Monmouthshire, Wales, originally formed the gatehouse to Usk Castle. Much altered in the eighteenth and nineteenth centuries, it is now a private home and a Grade I listed building.

== History ==
Castle House has its origins as the gatehouse to Usk Castle. Coflein gives the dates of construction as 1368–99. For many years, it was the residence of the castle's steward. While the castle declined in the later medieval period and was slighted during the English Civil War, Castle House underwent considerable expansion and alteration in the 18th and 19th centuries. By the early 20th century, it was described as a "gentrified town house". In 1925 Castle House, and its grounds including the castle ruins, were purchased for £525 by Rudge Humphreys, whose family still own the estate. The Monmouthshire antiquarian Joseph Bradney, in his History of Monmouthshire, recorded that Humphreys was agent to a Mrs Perry-Herrick, "who owns considerable estates in th(e) county". Humphreys undertook major excavation and restoration of the grounds, details of which were recorded in an archive of one hundred and seventy photographs, copies of which are held by the Royal Commission on the Ancient and Historical Monuments of Wales. (Note: Among the more unusual features of the gardens are the site of a small narrow-gauge railway used by Humphreys for earth moving during his excavations at the castle, and two Elia naval mines dating from World War II and now disarmed and set on plinths as garden ornaments.) The house is privately owned.

== Architecture and description ==
The building is of three storeys, in stucco, and with a slate roof. Its gabled rear range "incorporates the inner half of the late fourteenth century gatehouse" to the castle. The house is a Grade I listed building, its listing recording the reason for the designation; "listed as a major historic building, in particular (for) the importance of its medieval gatehouse". The gardens of Castle House, dating from the early twentieth century, include a herb garden with medieval planting and are occasionally open under the National Gardens Scheme. A barn adjacent to the house and sited at the end of the outer ward of the castle is listed at Grade II.

== Sources ==
- Bradney, Joseph (1993). A History of Monmouthshire: The Hundred of Usk, Volume 3 Part 1. Academy Books. ISBN 9781873361160. OCLC 896118895.
- Newman, John (2000). Gwent/Monmouthshire. The Buildings of Wales. London: Penguin. ISBN 0-14-071053-1.
