= Llandegfedd Reservoir =

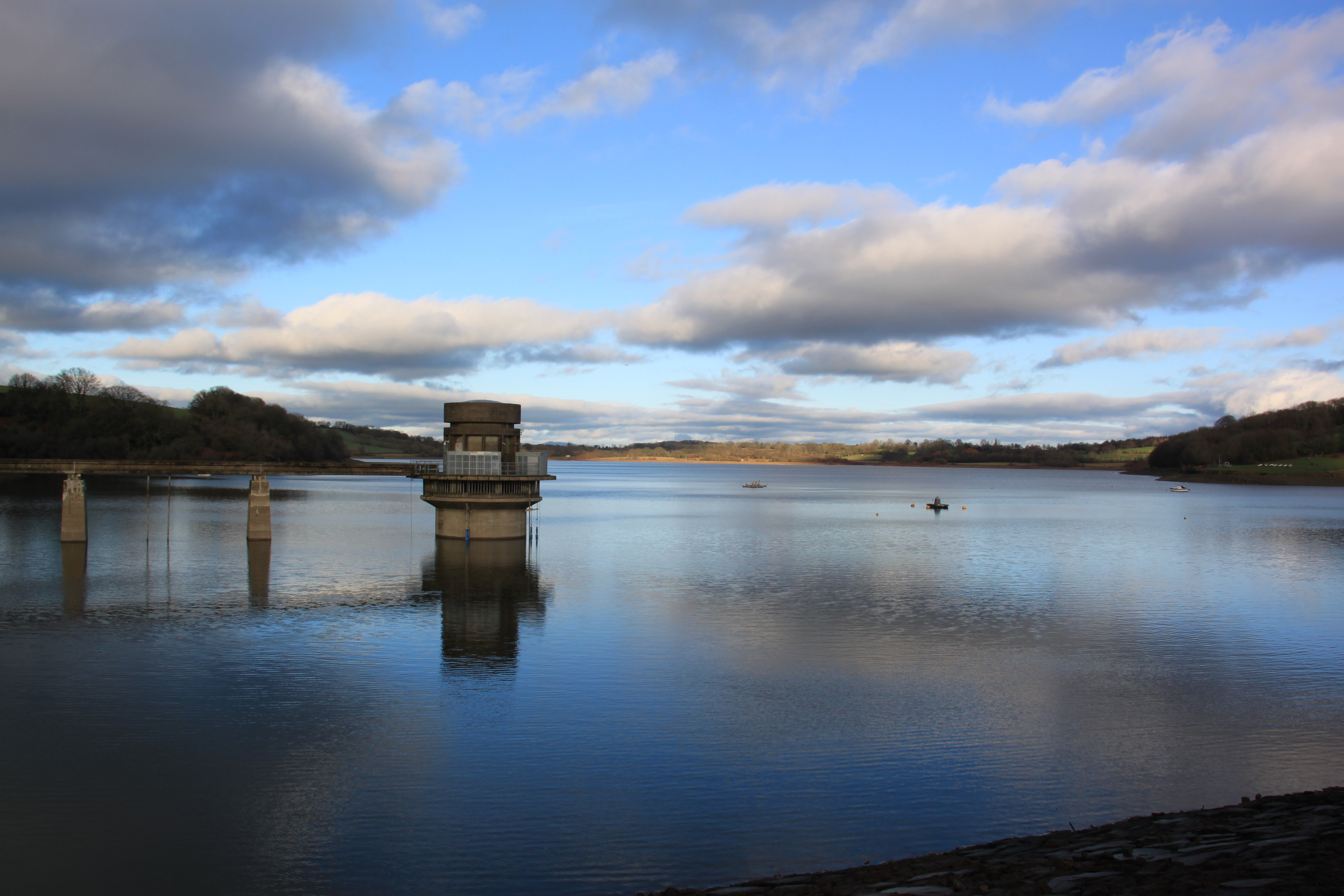

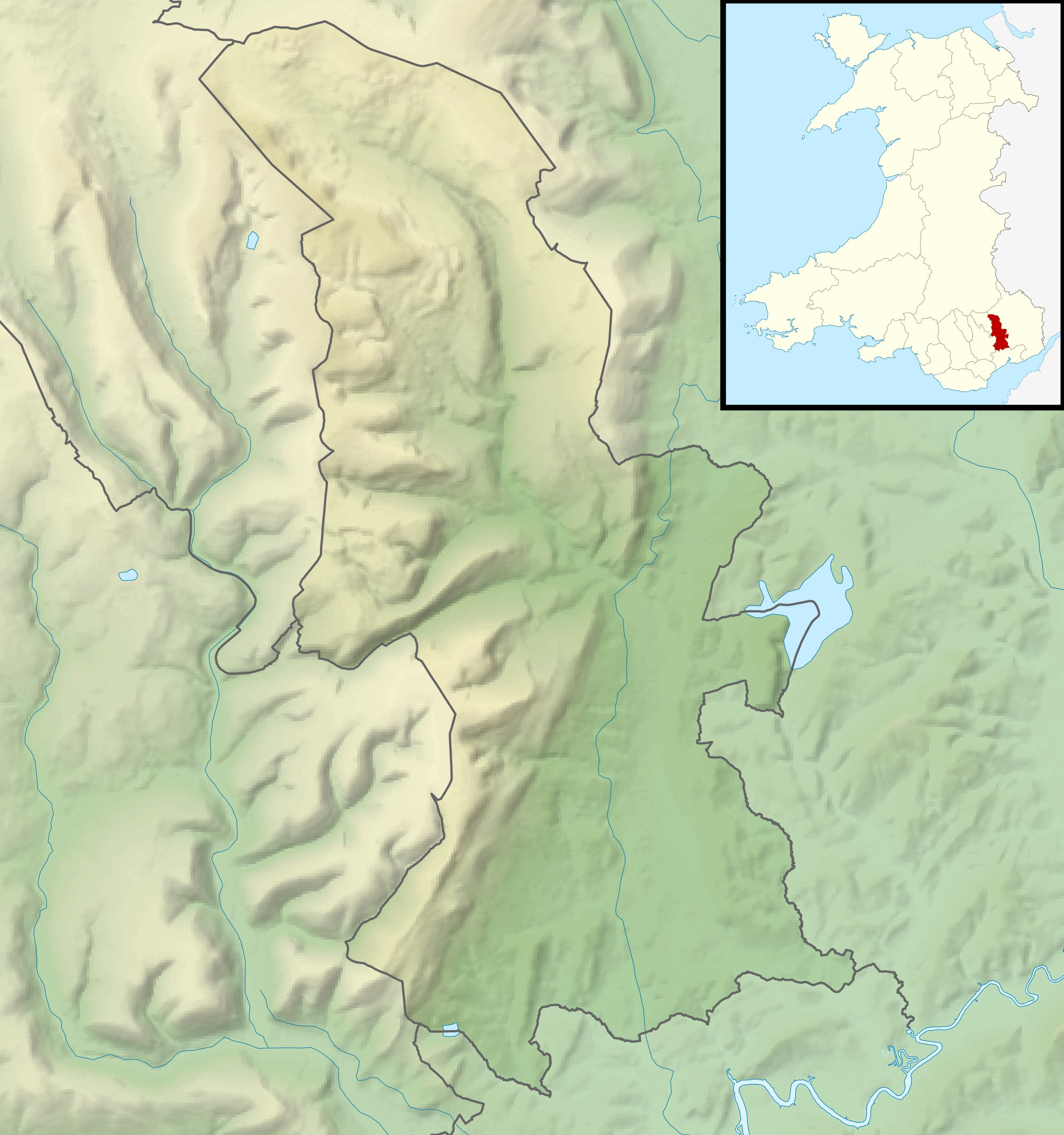
- Location within Torfaen
- Location: South Wales
- Coordinates: 51°42′N 2°58′W
- Type: reservoir
- Basin countries: United Kingdom
- Surface area: 434 acres (176 ha)
- Website: http://www.llandegfedd.co.uk

Llandegfedd Reservoir (also spelled as Llandegveth) is a large 174 hectare water supply reservoir and is eight miles (13 km) north of Newport in south Wales. The reservoir is very close to Pontypool, Cwmbran and Usk, with the boundary between Monmouthshire and Torfaen running through it along the former Sôr Brook.

== History ==
It was opened by Cardiff City Council in May 1965. The reservoir itself covers an area of 434 acres (1.76 km^{2}) and is managed by Welsh Water.

It is located near Coed-y-paen village.

== Management and use ==
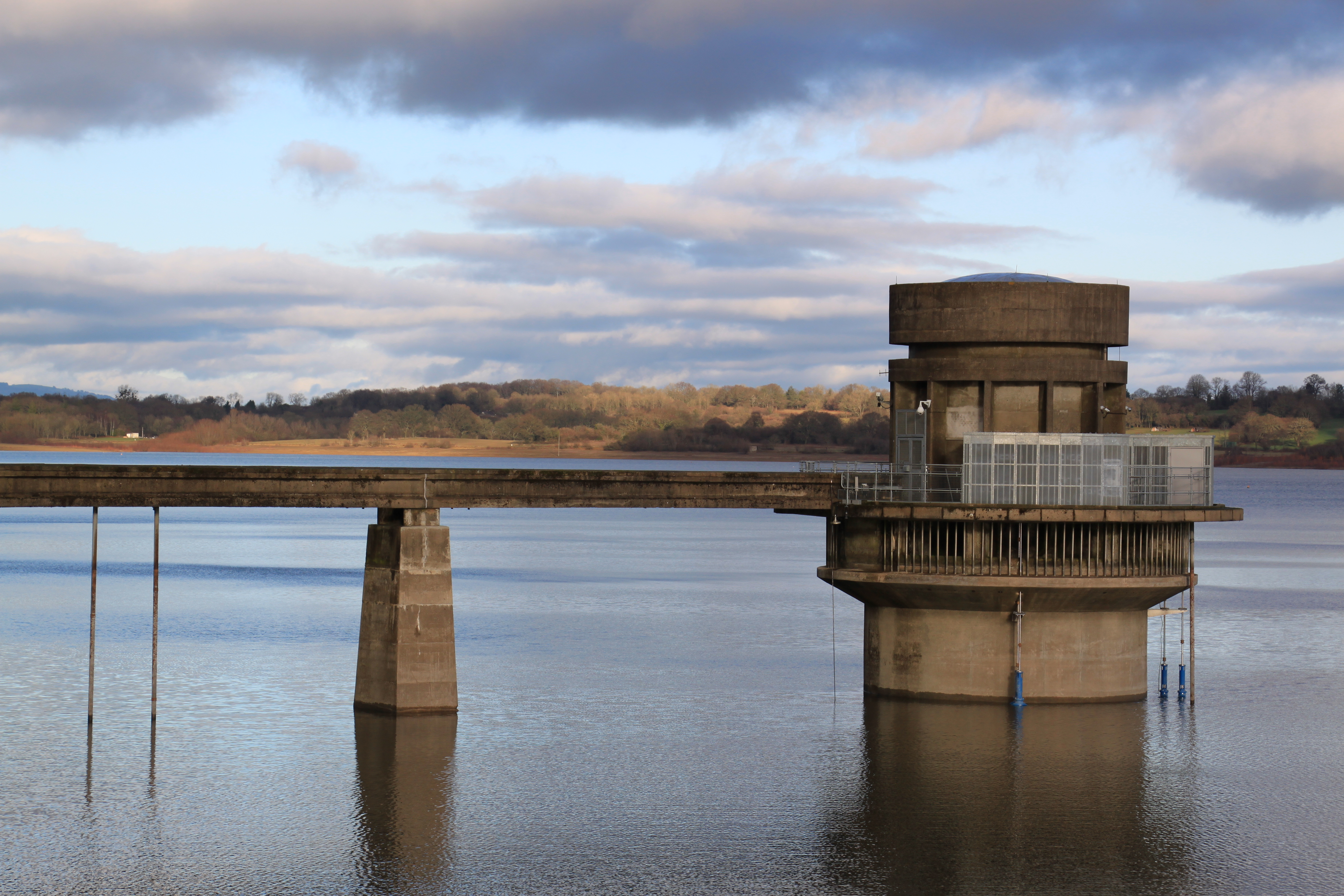
Water Intake Tower

The reservoir is managed in accordance with the Llandegfedd Reservoir – Recreation and Conservation Management Plan and in consultation with the Llandegfedd Reservoir User Liaison Group. The scheme includes:

Spatial zoning based on the reservoir's physical characteristics and sports and conservation requirements compromise:

- Conservation areas – shallow northern waters and shores, which are the principal wildfowl overwintering, feeding and nesting areas.
- Sailing and windsurfing area – all water except conservation and diving zones.
- Diving area – deeper waters near the water outlet.
- Canoeing area – southern section of the Reservoir.
- Boat fly-fishing areas – all except the conservation and diving zones.
- Bank fishing areas – selected shores, which avoid other users and dangerous banks.
- A visitor centre with a café and balcony with views of the lake and water-based activities.

Seasonal restrictions:

- Sailing seasons – March to October, and 4 hours on Sundays during winter.
- Fly-fishing season – March to October.
- Diving – primarily a winter activity (poor visibility in summer).

Zoning and other restriction leaflets are available from the on-site ranger service.

== Leisure activities ==
The land surrounding the reservoir is run as a country park and supports an R.Y.A-recognised sailing and windsurfing school that operates from Easter to October. Dinghies, windsurfers and canoes can be hired and fishing is another common activity on and around the lake.

Season tickets and day tickets can be purchased for water sports.

== Fishing ==
The reservoir supports several varieties of fish – rainbow trout, bream, roach, pike and perch. The reservoir is well known for large pike catches. The Pike Anglers' Club of Great Britain lists the heaviest pike caught coming from the reservoir – a 46 lb 13oz fish caught on a lure in October 1992 by Roy Lewis.

== Birds ==
Wintering wildfowl include large numbers of wigeon, teal and pochard, as well as goldeneye and ruddy duck, and Bewick's swan and goosander regularly use the reservoir as a roost, the swans feeding by day on Olway Meadows and the goosanders probably coming from the River Usk. Divers and rarer grebes are occasional visitors, as are sea duck (notably long-tailed duck). Numbers of common gull, herring gull and black-headed gulls roost, and siskin and redpoll occur in the waterside trees. Residents include great crested grebe, sparrowhawk and buzzard, while cormorant and grey heron are regular visitors, and merlin, peregrine and goshawk have been recorded.

A variety of waders pass through, with ringed plover and little ringed plover, oystercatcher and common sandpiper and green sandpipers being among the more likely. Other migrants have included osprey and hobby. Breeding summer visitors include yellow wagtail.
