= Opus spicatum =

Masonry pattern used in Roman and medieval times

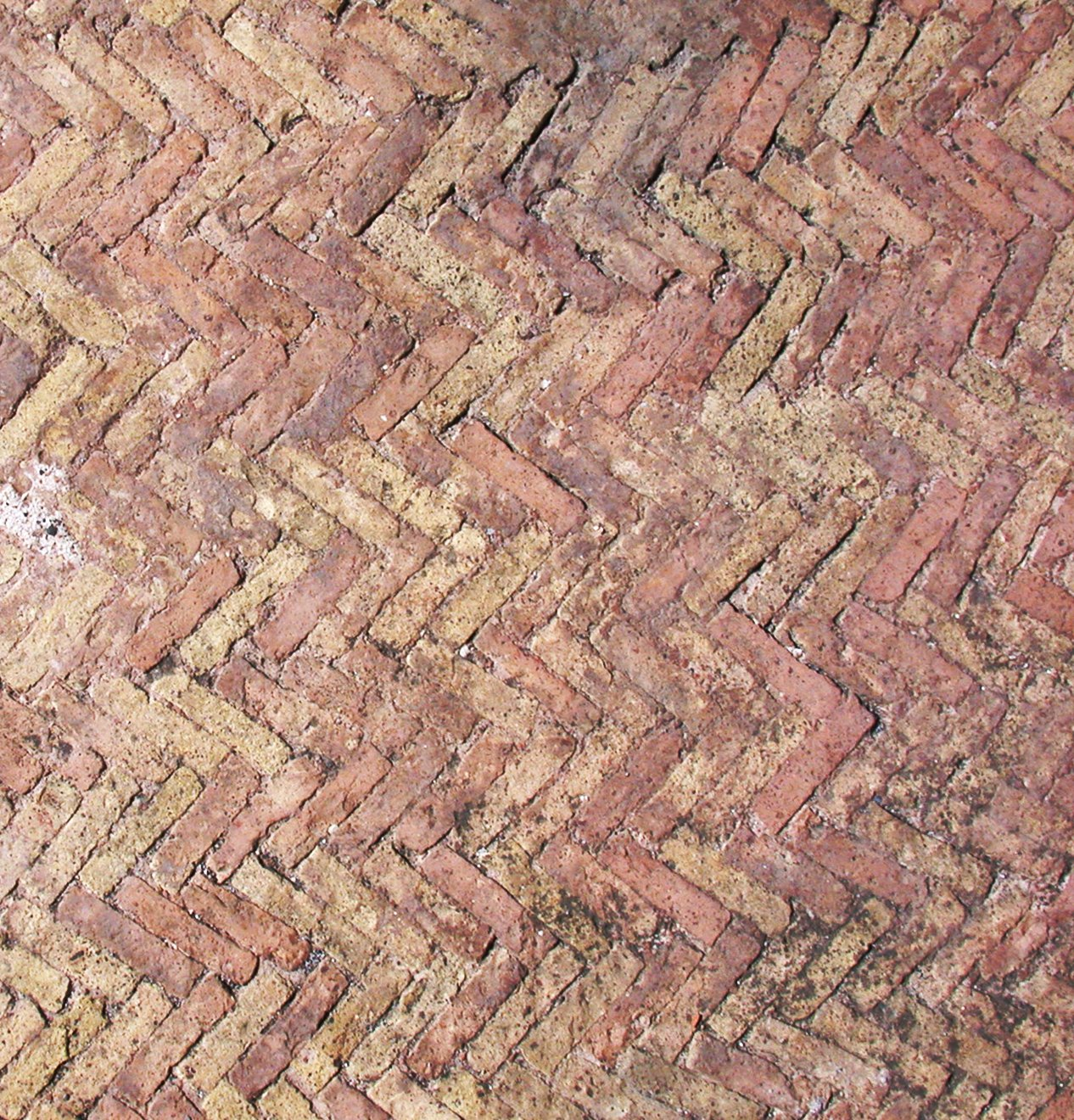
Opus spicatum paving in Trajan's Market, Rome.

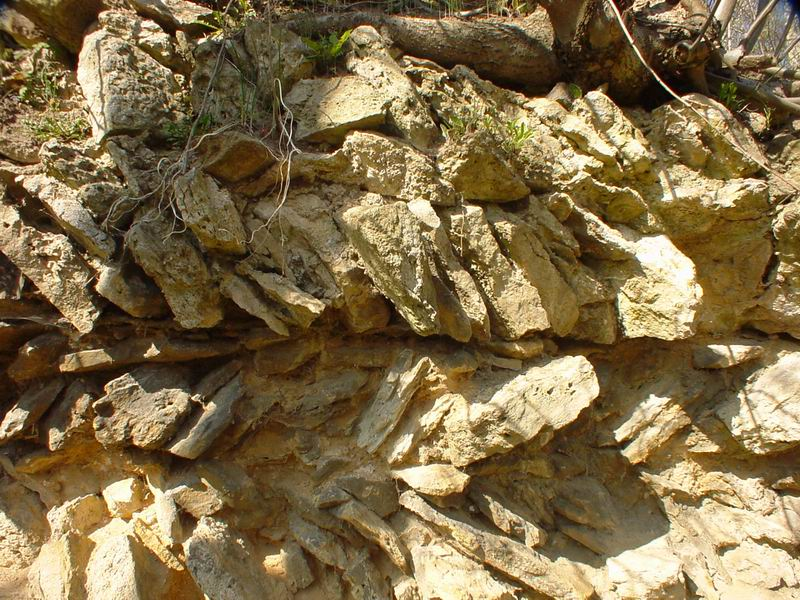
Wall in opus spicatum.

Opus spicatum, literally "spiked work," is a type of masonry construction used in Roman and medieval times. It consists of bricks, tiles or cut stone laid in a herringbone pattern.

== Uses ==
Its usage was generally decorative and most commonly it served as a pavement, though it was also used as an infill pattern in walls, as in the striking base of the causeway leading up to the gate tower at Tamworth Castle. Unless the elements run horizontally and vertically, it is inherently weak, since the oblique angles of the elements tend to spread the pattern horizontally under compression.

The type of construction was constantly employed in Roman, Byzantine and Romanesque work, and in the latter was regarded as a test of very early date. It is frequently found in the Byzantine walls in Asia Minor, and in Byzantine churches was employed decoratively to give variety to the wall surface. Sometimes the diagonal courses are reversed one above the other.

The herringbone pattern produces opposing shear plane faces, increasing the relative surface area and therefore rendering it a sounder design for mortar and brick.

=== Firebacks ===
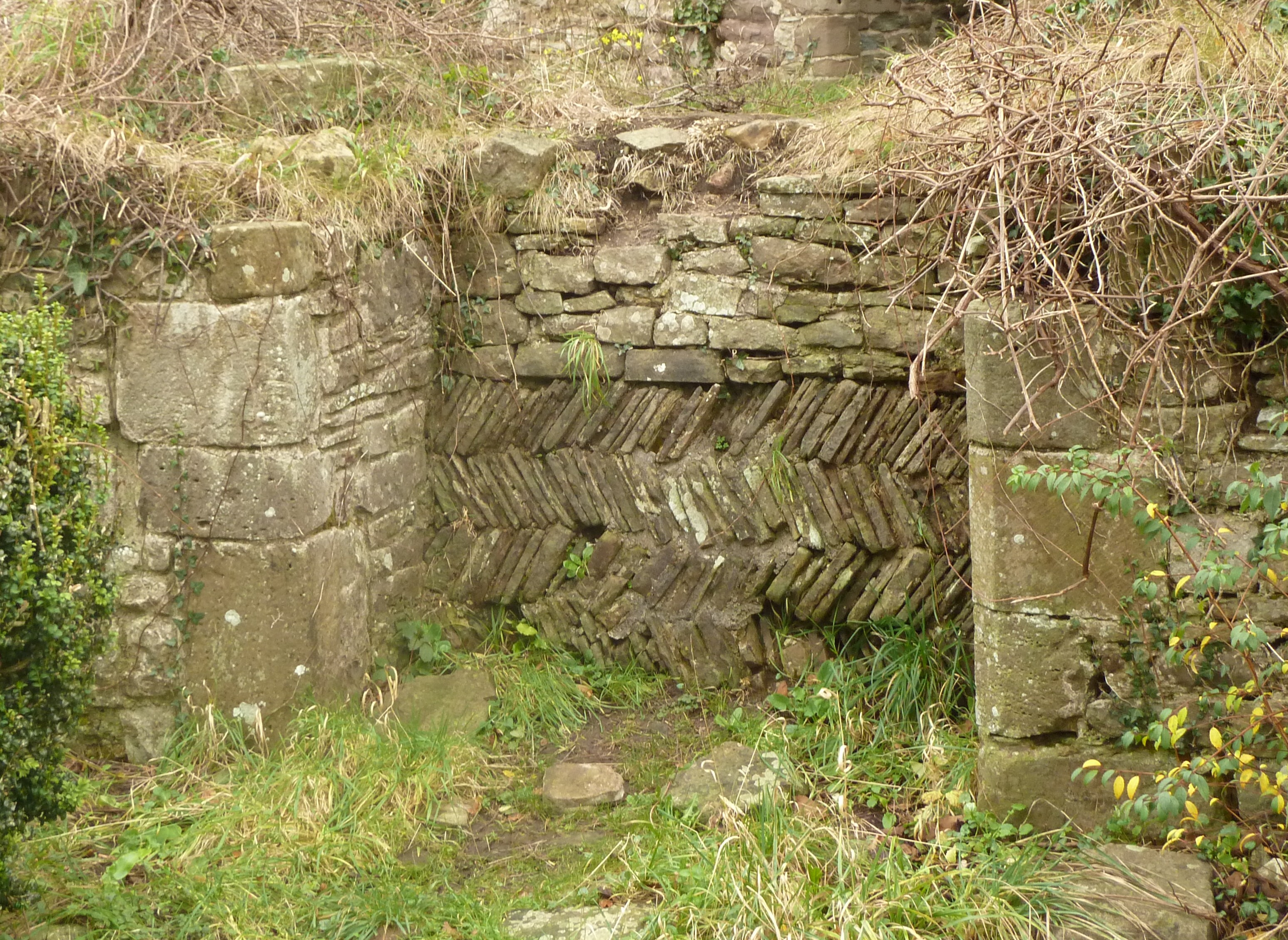
Fireplace at Usk Castle

Herringbone work, particularly in stone, is also used to make firebacks in stone hearths. Acidic flue gases tend to corrode lime mortar, so a finely set herringbone could remain intact with a minimum of mortar used. Usk Castle has several fine examples.

== Examples ==
The herringbone method was used by Filippo Brunelleschi in constructing the dome of the Cathedral of Florence (Santa Maria del Fiore).

Examples in France exist in the churches at Querqueville in Normandy and St Christophe at Suèvres, both dating from the 10th century, and in England herring-bone masonry is found in the walls of castles, such as at Guildford, Colchester and Tamworth, as well as Usk Castle in Wales.

Herringbone brickwork was also a feature of Gothic Revival architecture.

== See also ==
- Roman masonry – building techniques in ancient Rome
- Roman concrete, also known as Opus caementicium – Building material used in ancient Rome
- Roman architecture
