= Monkswood, Monmouthshire =

Coordinates: 51°43′06″N 2°57′14″W

Monkswood (Welsh: Coed y Mynach) is a village in Monmouthshire, south east Wales, United Kingdom.

== Location ==
Monkswood is located two miles west of Usk on the A472 road to Pontypool. It lies parallel to the Berthon Brook, a minor tributary of the River Usk.

== History and amenities ==
Monkswood derives its name from the area of land farmed by monks from Usk in medieval times.

After a battle near Usk, the Battle of Pwll Melyn, during the Owain Glyndŵr rebellion in the early 15th century the Welsh forces were pursued across the River Usk and through Monkswood where many were slaughtered.

BAE Systems, Glascoed, the UK's sole munitions filling and packing facility, is hidden in a wooded valley nearby and to the south of the A472 road.

The village pub was the Beaufort Arms (which finally closed in 2010).
