= Coed-y-paen =

Coordinates: 51.6829°N 2.9635°W

- Christchurch

- Location within Monmouthshire
- OS grid reference: ST 33480 98677
- Principal area: Monmouthshire
- Country: Wales
- Sovereign state: United Kingdom
- Post town: PONTYPOOL
- Postcode district: NP4
- Dialling code: 01291
- Police: Gwent
- Fire: South Wales
- Ambulance: Welsh
- UK Parliament: Monmouth
- Senedd Cymru – Welsh Parliament: Monmouth

Coed-y-paen is a village in South Wales, situated at the south-eastern end of Llandegfedd Reservoir, 2.5 miles (4 km) north-west of Llangybi. HM Prison Prescoed, a Category D prison, is located nearby.

The village has one public house, the Carpenters Arms.

== Christchurch ==
The village church, Christchurch, was designed in 1848 by architect Sir Matthew Digby-Wyatt.

The church was built as a chapel of ease to the parish church of Llangybi. It was conveyed to the Church in Wales in 1861. A fine Victorian church of the Early English style, it comprises a nave and chancel and a western tower of three floors. It has a single bell.
