= Priory Gatehouse, Usk =

The Priory Gatehouse, Usk
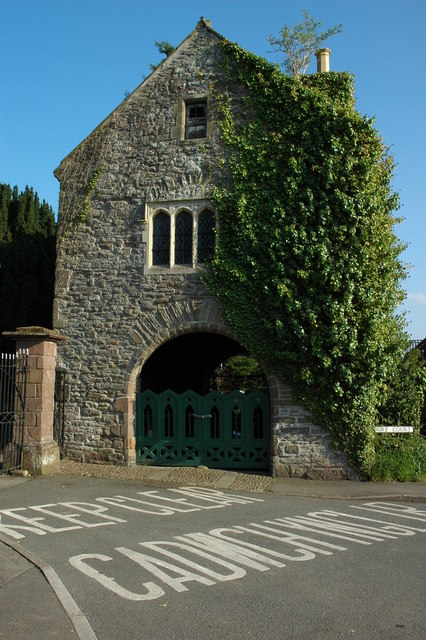
- Interactive map of the The Priory Gatehouse, Usk area

General information
- Architectural style: medieval
- Location: Usk, Wales
- Coordinates: 51.70244°N 2.90096°W

Design and construction
- Designations: Grade I listed

The Priory Gatehouse in Usk, Monmouthshire, Wales, is a surviving fragment of a Benedictine priory founded around 1135 and dissolved in 1536. It stands beside the main entrance to the churchyard. It is a Grade I listed building.

The gatehouse is of two storeys, with gables and wide inner and outer arches. The style of the windows suggests a "sixteenth century date, possibly even post-Dissolution".
