= Old Town Hall, Usk =

County Building in Usk, Wales

Old Town Hall
- Hen Neuadd y Dref Brynbuga (Welsh)
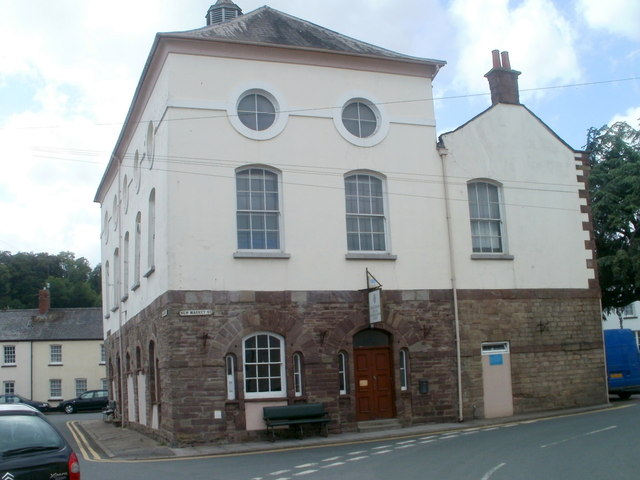
- Old Town Hall, showing the (original) southern block on the left and the (newer) northern block on the right

- Shown in Monmouthshire
- 51.7001°N 2.9046°W
- Location: Old Market Street, Usk

History
- Built: 1771

Site notes
- Architectural style: Neoclassical style

Listed Building – Grade II
- Official name: The Town Hall
- Designated: 1 April 1974
- Reference no.: 2176

The Old Town Hall (Welsh: Hen Neuadd y Dref Brynbuga) is a municipal building in Old Market Street, Usk, Monmouthshire, Wales. The structure, used as the local club of the Royal British Legion, is a Grade II listed building.

== History ==
The first municipal building in the town was a market hall in Twyn Square which was completed in the late 14th century. After the building in Twyn Square became dilapidated, Henry Herbert, 2nd Earl of Pembroke offered to provide land on a site some 400 yards (370 m) to the southwest of the original building and a new market hall was erected there in 1598.

The current building was commissioned as a replacement for the 16th century structure by the then-lord of the manor, Henry Somerset, 5th Duke of Beaufort, whose seat was at Raglan Castle, in the mid-18th century. He paid for the construction and, as owner, received the market tolls. This new single-story building, which formed the southern block of the existing complex, was designed in the neoclassical style, built in rubble masonry and was completed in 1771. The design involved a symmetrical main frontage with five bays facing onto Old Market Street; it was arcaded, so that markets could be held. A meeting was held in the town hall to draw up a petition to the UK Parliament to demand the abolition of the slave trade in March 1792.

The structure was extended northwards, at the expense of Henry Somerset, 6th Duke of Beaufort, by the creation of a narrow single-story northern block of six bays, in 1816. Both blocks were augmented again by the creation of extra floors in 1835. The extra floor on the southern block, which was erected to accommodate a lofty council chamber for the burgesses, was fenestrated by five segmentally-headed sash windows and five distinctive oculi overlooking Old Market Street. Meanwhile, the extra floor on the northern block, which involved a central section of four bays which was slightly projected forward and pedimented, was fenestrated by plain sash windows.

The building also acted as a judicial facility and, in 1840, the trial of some of the Chartist rioters were heard in the town hall. After the arcading on the ground floor was infilled to reduce draughtiness in 1859, the ground floor in the southern section was converted for use as a police station, with cells for incarcerating petty criminals, while the ground floor in the northern section was converted for use as a fire station. The 8th Monmouthshire Rifle Volunteer Corps was raised in Usk in October 1860 and paraded in front of the town hall before being sent on a march to Raglan Castle.

The role of the town hall as a judicial facility ceased when court hearings relocated to the new Sessions House in 1877. The borough council, which had been managed by a court leet, was abolished under the Municipal Corporations Act 1883. The local board of health for the area was succeeded by an urban district with its headquarters in the building in 1894. Political meetings also took place in the town hall: a Conservative Association meeting under the chairmanship of George Somerset, 3rd Baron Raglan, whose seat was at Cefntilla Court, took place in June 1900.

A monument, in the form of a granite column surmounted by an urn, which was intended to commemorate the lives of local service personnel who had died in the Second Boer War, was unveiled to the north of the town hall by the former portreeve of the borough, James Henry Clark, in 1908. The new urban district council continued to meet in the council chamber until 1936: the building then became the meeting place of the local club of the Royal British Legion and it was acquired by the club in the 1970s.
