= HM Prison Prescoed =

Men's prison in Monmouthshire, Wales

HMP Prescoed
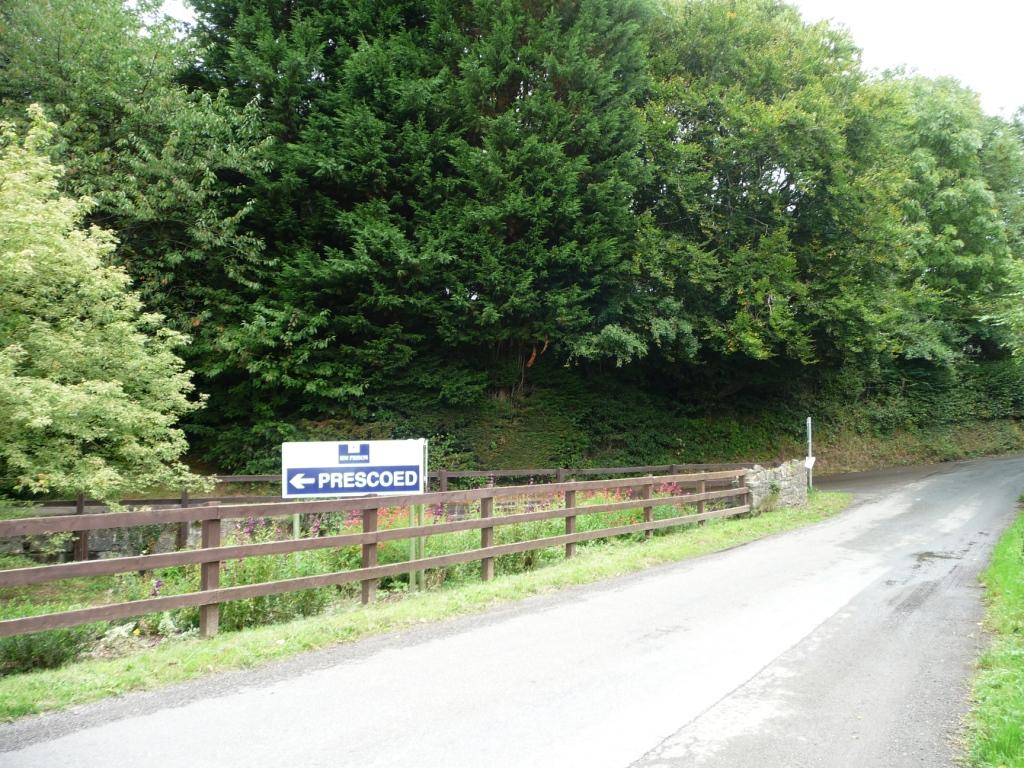
- Entrance to HMP Prescoed
- Interactive map of HMP Prescoed
- Location: Usk, Monmouthshire, Wales; 51.686193°N 2.943199°W
- Security class: Adult Male/Category D
- Capacity: 230
- Population: about 230 (May 2013)
- Opened: 1939
- Managed by: HM Prison Services
- Governor: Rob Denman
- Website: Prescoed at justice.gov.uk

HM Prison Prescoed (Welsh: Carchar Prescoed EF) is a Category D men's open prison, located in Coed-y-paen, three miles from Usk in Monmouthshire, Wales. Prescoed is operated by His Majesty's Prison Service, and acts as a satellite prison of the nearby HMP Usk.

== History ==
Prescoed has been re-purposed multiple times since its construction by prisoner labour in 1939. From 1939 to 1964, it was an open borstal for youth. From 1964 to 1983, it was an open Borstal. The nearby HMP Usk was a Detention Centre. It was used for the next five years as an open Youth Custody Centre before, in 1988, becoming an open Young Offender Institution. By 2000, it was transformed into an adult open prison.

In July 2003, Prescoed Prison (along with HMP Usk) was listed by the Prison Service as one of the top five performing Prisons in England and Wales, the first time that prisons had been ranked in a published league table.

In 2004 Prescoed started to hold a number of convicted sex offenders who had been transferred from HMP Usk. There was considerable opposition to this from local residents, who feared that such inmates may abscond from the open jail and pose a threat to local children. There were several incidents of convicted sex offenders absconding from Prescoed. The prison holds [July 2017] around 10% (an average of 25) sex offenders.

In August 2008, an inspection report from Her Majesty's Chief Inspector of Prisons stated that although there had been "dips in performance", Prescoed and Usk prisons retained good standards. Among features of the prison praised by the report were cleanliness, safety, race equality work, and interrelations between staff and prisoners. Also found to be good were the education and training provisions for inmates at both sites. However the report found that staff were not "sufficiently trained." Resettlement projects for inmates at Prescoed were said to be run "reasonably well".

== Today ==
Prescoed is an open prison, accommodating Category D adult males. Inmates are normally transferred to Prescoed from other jails (mainly Cardiff, Swansea, Parc, Earlstoke, Channings Wood and sometimes HMP Usk), to serve out the latter parts of their sentences, and re-integrate back into the community before release. Accommodation at the prison is divided into at least 10 purpose-built living units, some with single rooms, the rest being doubles, where each prisoner usually has his own room key.

All prisoners are interviewed by the Learning and Skills Department of the prison in their first week at Prescoed. A range of education is offered to inmates on a full-time and part-time basis. Vocational training is also offered at Prescoed through work placements. Many inmates work on the prison's farm, which has 120 dairy cattle plus young stock, along with a small herd of pedigree Welsh Black cattle. There is also a sawmill, from which wood products, sourced from a 160-acre (65 ha) woodland, are being developed by prisoners and staff.

Other facilities at the prison include a library, IT suites, gym, and a chaplaincy service. The prison has an operational capacity of 230.

Prescoed has a football team competing in the Gwent Central League. In 2020 the league initially banned them from competing, but turned back on their decision. As of 2019 it is the only prison football team in Wales.

== Notable inmates ==
- Chris Zebroski
- Mark Aizlewood
