= Battle of Pwll Melyn =

1405 battle in Wales

Coordinates: 51.718°N 2.954°W

- Part of Glyndwr Rising
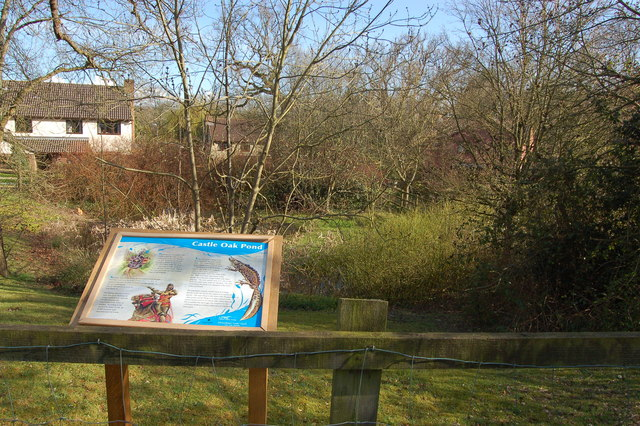
- Castle Oak Pond at Usk, believed to be on the site of the battle
Date	5 May 1405
Location	Pwll Melyn, near Usk
Result	English victory

Belligerents
Principality of Wales	Kingdom of England and Welsh allies

Commanders and leaders
Gruffudd ab Owain Glyndŵr (POW); Tudur ap Gruffudd †	Richard Grey; John Oldcastle; Dafydd Gam

Strength
Unknown	Unknown

Casualties and losses
300–1,500	Light

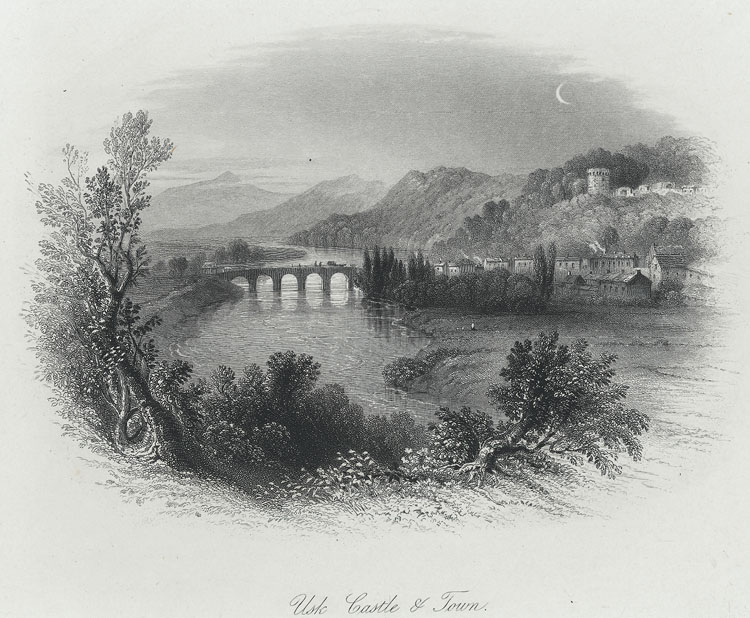
Usk Castle and town

The Battle of Pwll Melyn (also known as the Battle of Usk) was a battle between the Welsh and English on 5 May 1405. It was part of the Glyndŵr Rising that lasted from 1400 to 1415. It was the first English victory in a pitched battle during the war. The battle resulted in heavy casualties for the Welsh, including two important commanders, Owain Glyndwr's brother and eldest son.

== Dating and location ==
There is some confusion of the date of this battle and also its position in regard to another battle in Gwent at Grosmont. However, R. R. Davies believes the Battle of Grosmont was in March and Pwll Melyn was in May.

The location of the battle is the land immediately to the north of Usk Castle, towards Castle Farm and including what is now Castle Oak Pond. According to historian J. E. Lloyd, writing in 1933:

Pwll Melyn . . . is the pond lying north-east of Usk Castle. . . numerous skeletons were found in this pond when it was cleaned out. The pond is so called because the water is always slimy and of a dirty colour. . . The 'pwll' itself is reduced in size, the marshy land drained, and the 'pwll' is now enclosed by an iron railing and supplies water to the railway. From the 'pwll' the ground rises westward and here Owen's army attacked the castle on the north. It is a well-known spot and the name has never been lost.

== Description ==
Following a defeat at the Battle of Grosmont, the Welsh rebels were trying to regain the momentum in the North Gwent area. The battle began with a daring assault by Welsh forces, led by Gruffudd ab Owain Glyndŵr against Usk Castle. The castle repulsed the attack and the Welsh retreated to the north. The garrison of Usk Castle, led by Richard Grey, 1st Baron Grey of Codnor, Sir John Greyndour, Dafydd Gam, and Sir John Oldcastle of Herefordshire, pursued the Welsh into the forest of Monkswood, Monmouthshire towards Mynydd Pwll Melyn - the 'Hill of the Yellow Pool'. Here, the English attacked and routed the Welsh forces. Adam of Usk’s contemporary description gives a vivid picture of the attacks on the retreating Welsh: “there slew with fire and the edge of the sword many of them, and above all the Abbot of Llanthony, and they crushed them without ceasing, driving them through the monk's wood, where the said Griffin (Owain's son) was taken.”

According to the Scottish chronicler Walter Bower, Dafydd Gam, a committed enemy of the rebellion, a Welshman originally from Brecon but holding land at Llantilio Crossenny, Monmouthshire, played a significant part in the English victory. Gam's local knowledge and reputation might very well have been vital. He may have won over local Welshmen to fight against Glyndwr, or possibly may even have gained warning of the attack in advance. According to Adam of Usk, a main source of contemporary insight into the uprising, Usk Castle “had been put into some condition for defence” prior to the attack.

Whether this strengthening represented a standard precautionary move considering the ongoing revolt or whether they had specific advance warning is uncertain, but to inflict such a heavy defeat on a large attacking force, their numbers probably were considerable and it seems that Gruffudd had no inkling of the strength of the numbers he faced inside Usk castle. It is perhaps significant that just two years earlier in 1403, Owain Glyndŵr had burnt the town of Usk to the ground, with loss of life and property so local people may not have favoured his cause. The presence of such English leaders as Grey and Greyndor combined with men with excellent local knowledge and reputations as Dafydd Gam and John Oldcastle at the exact time of a Welsh attack does seem indicative if not conclusive of there being foreknowledge.

Henry of Monmouth was in overall control of English forces fighting against the revolt at the time and was based in Hereford, though he does not seem to have been at the battle himself.

== Casualties ==
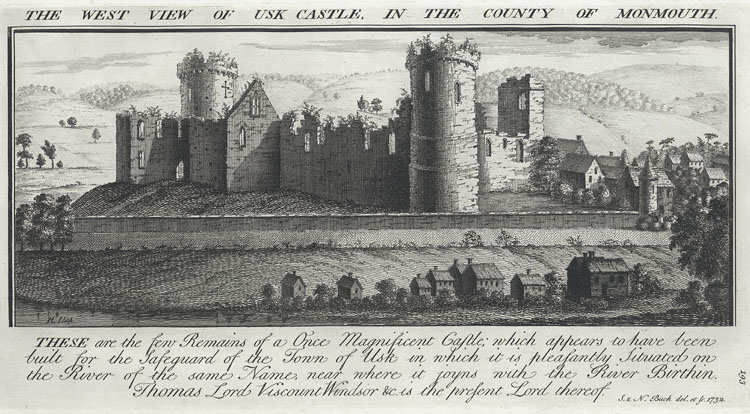
The west view of Usk Castle

Casualties on the Welsh side were heavy; they lost 1500 men according to some sources, a large number considering their heavy recent losses at Grosmont. According to Adam of Usk three hundred prisoners were beheaded in front of Usk Castle following the battle. Gruffudd ab Owain Glyndŵr was captured, while Owain's brother Tudur was slain in the field. The close family resemblance in Tudur's face briefly convinced some English that Owain himself had fallen. Another serious blow was the death of John ap Hywel, Abbot of the Llantarnam Cistercian monastery, a notable supporter of Glyndŵr who was killed during the battle as he ministered to the dying and wounded of both sides. Rhys Gethin may also have died here if he did not die in the earlier Battle of Grosmont.

== Assessment ==
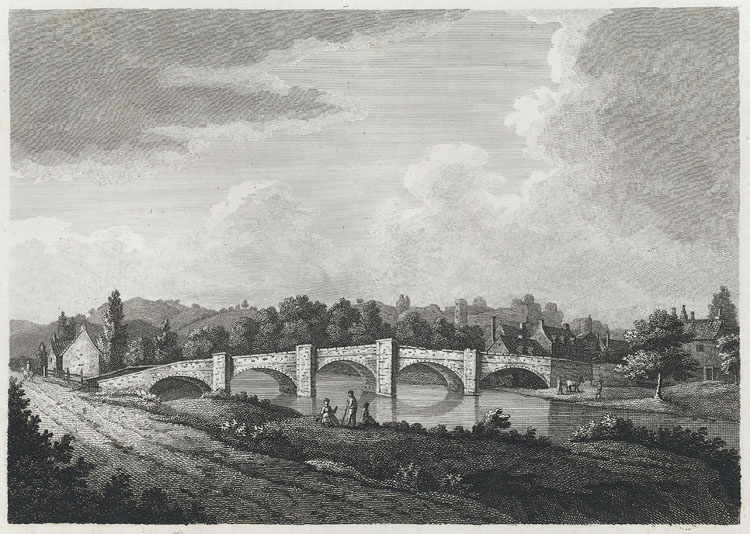
Bridge and Castle of Usk

Adam of Usk states concerning the battle that: “And from that time forth in those parts the fortunes of Owen waned.” Welsh Annals state that: “At this time Glamorgan made its submission to the English, except a few who went to Gwynedd to their master." It seems the battle saw more or less the end of the strength of the rebellion in south east Wales. One history of the rebellion says of the battle that the defeat “suggest that the rashness of local initiatives was endangering the revolt as a whole.” It certainly indicates the dangers of Owain's guerrilla warfare tactics when the enemy were prepared. Defeat in the battle and the loss of many good men was to undermine the possibilities offered by the French troops that arrived later that year to support Glyndwr. It is significant that just a few months later in late summer, Owain when facing King Henry IV himself on Abberley Hill in Worcestershire felt reluctant to initiate an attack, the two opposing armies facing each other for eight days. It is interesting to conjecture that with victory behind him at Usk and his brother still alive and south east Wales secure how Owain might have conducted himself at Abberley Hill - the battle that never was.

In 2005, the 600th anniversary of the battle of Pwll Melyn was commemorated by a son-et-lumiere show. In 2007 A plaque commemorating the battle was placed near the spot where it took place.
