= Harold Jones (murderer) =

Welsh murderer (1906–1971)

- Mugshot of Jones in 1921
- Born: 11 January 1906; Abertillery, Monmouthshire, Wales
- Died: 2 January 1971 (aged 64); Hammersmith, London, England
- Other name: Harry Stevens
- Occupation: Store assistant
- Status: Released 6 December 1941
- Motive: Rape (Freda Burnell); Thrill killing (Florence Little)
- Conviction: Murder
- Penalty: Detained at His Majesty's pleasure

Harold Jones (11 January 1906 – 2 January 1971) was a Welsh child murderer who killed two preadolescent girls in Monmouthshire, Wales, in 1921, when he was aged 15.

Jones was acquitted of the murder of his first victim, eight-year-old Freda Burnell, at Monmouthshire Assizes on 21 June 1921. Seventeen days later, he murdered an 11-year-old neighbour named Florence Little. Jones pleaded guilty to Little's murder and also confessed to having murdered Burnell at his second trial.

As Jones was under the age of 16 when he committed the murders, he escaped execution for his crimes, instead being sentenced to be detained at His Majesty's pleasure on 1 November 1921. He was released from HM Prison Wandsworth in 1941, later marrying and fathering a child. Jones died of bone cancer in 1971 at the age of 64.

== Early life ==
Harold Jones was born in the Welsh colliery town of Abertillery, Monmouthshire, in January 1906, the eldest of four children born into a poor family. His father, Phillip, worked as a coal miner and his mother was a housewife. Jones and his siblings attended a local council school where he was regarded as a popular and exemplary pupil, showing a particular flair for sports, and holding aspirations to become a professional boxer. He is also known to have spent much of his free time reading and to have occasionally played the organ at local church services.

Jones left school at 14 so that he could begin working and thereby supplement his family's income. He found employment at a local oil and seed merchant named Mortimer's Stores. Here, he was known to be a punctual and trustworthy employee who was both capable of managing the shop without help and popular with customers.

== Murders ==
=== Freda Burnell ===
On the afternoon of 5 February 1921, Freda Elsie Maud Burnell, aged eight, was reported missing by her parents. She had last been seen by her father, Frederick, at approximately 9 o'clock that morning, having been sent on an errand from her home at 9 Earl Street to purchase poultry spice and grit from Mortimer's Stores in nearby Somerset Street to feed the family livestock, with her father promising her a penny upon her return.

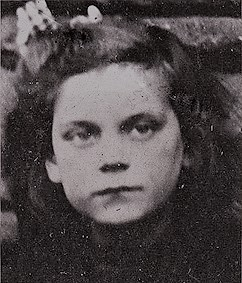
Freda Burnell

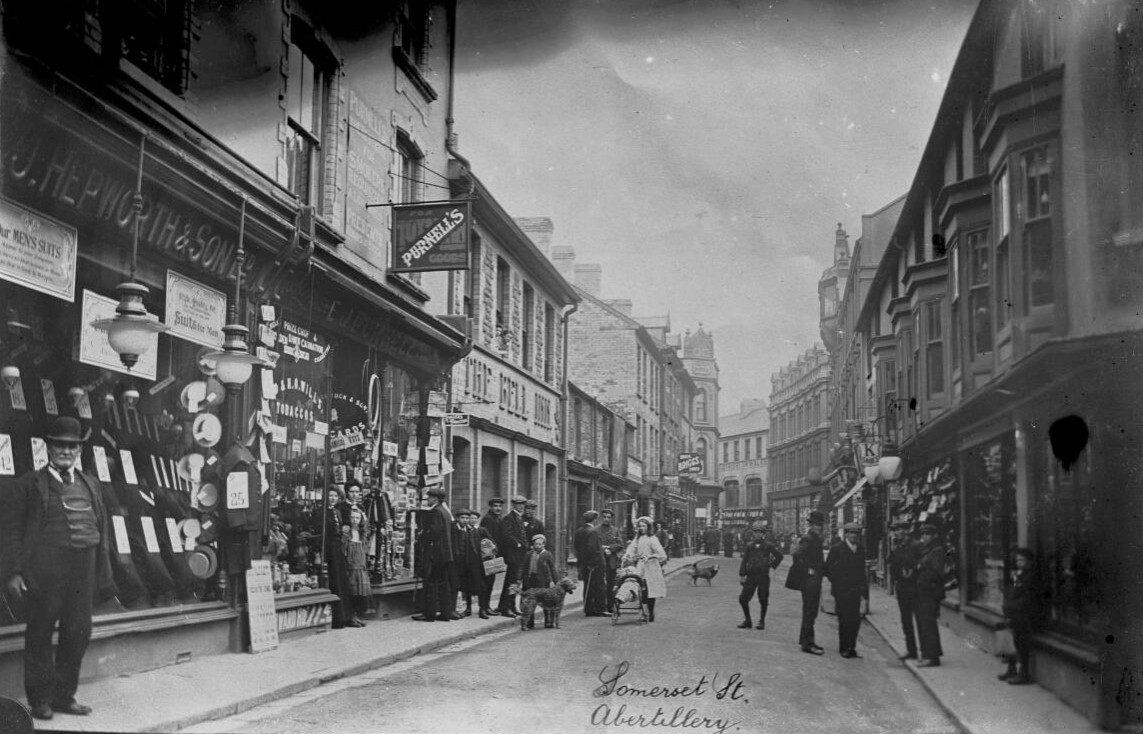
Somerset Street, Abertillery, c. 1910. Freda Burnell disappeared from this street on 5 February 1921.

When Burnell had not returned home after an hour, her frantic parents began making inquiries, including at the store Freda had been sent to visit. The 15-year-old assistant at this store, Harold Jones, confirmed to Burnell's father (and later the police) that the child had visited the store at approximately 9:05 a.m. and that he had served her a bag of poultry spice, adding that she had also asked for a bag of poultry grit but he had informed her the store only had loose poultry grit. Burnell, he claimed, had left the store to ask her father whether loose poultry grit would suffice, and he had not seen her since. By 3:00 p.m., the Burnell family had informed police Freda was missing, and an exhaustive search for the child was launched.

The following morning, Burnell's body was found by a collier concealed in a sack in an alleyway just 300 yards (270 m) from Mortimer's Stores. (Note: A workman would inform investigators he had passed the precise spot where Burnell's body was discovered just fifteen minutes before the collier had discovered her body, and was adamant the sack had not been there, thus making the most likely time the body had been deposited at this location sometime between 7:15 a.m. and 7:30 a.m.) Her cause of death was certified as being a combination of blunt trauma to her head and strangulation evident via a cord still tied around her neck, with the time of death having been between 9:30 a.m. and 1:00 p.m. on the date of her disappearance. In addition, Burnell had been gagged, her elbows had been bound behind her back, and her ankles were knotted together. An attempt had also been made to rape the child. Traces of corn chaff were also found upon and around Burnell's body, and inside the sack in which she was discovered. (Note: As per standard procedure, Abertillery Police contacted Scotland Yard to supervise the murder investigation. Detective Chief Inspector Albert Heldon and Detective Sergeant Alfred Soden arrived in the town on 7 February to supervise the investigation.)

Investigators noted that a chicken run in the shed belonging to Jones's employers located just a few hundred yards from where Burnell's body had been discovered had corn chaff extensively scattered upon the ground, and a handkerchief known to have been in her possession at the time of her disappearance was also found on the ground in the shed. In addition, an axe handle determined to have caused the blunt trauma to the child's head was discovered concealed beneath some sacking inside the shed. Aside from his employers, Jones was the only individual in possession of a key to the shed, and investigators established a clear time frame of between 9:15 and 9:40 a.m. when no witnesses had physically seen him inside the store.

"Halfway down the lane, Harold said: 'You wait here while I go down to the shed.' Harold walked on alone, turned and whispered loudly, 'You lot keep quiet!' ... Harold went into the shed ... when he came out, he locked the shed door and came back to us whispering, 'Keep quiet, keep quiet.'"

— Levi Meyrick's statement to police describing Harold Jones's actions between 10:20 p.m. and 10:30 p.m. on 5 February 1921.

A friend of Jones named Levi Meyrick also informed police that Jones had actively dissuaded both himself and his employer's son, Frank Mortimer, from accompanying him to the shed at approximately 10:20 p.m. on 5 February; another witness also informed police he had heard a female child's screams emanating from this shed on the actual morning of Burnell's disappearance. When questioned as to these facts, Jones insisted he had not been in the shed on the day of the child's disappearance. Nonetheless, investigators were convinced otherwise, and Jones was held in detention at Abertillery Police Station to await the outcome of the coroner's inquest. (Note: Levi Meyrick's statement asserted he and Mortimer had accompanied Jones as he walked to his employer's shed on the evening of 5 February to retrieve a sack of potatoes scheduled to be delivered to a customer the following morning. Upon returning to his friends from the shed without the potatoes, Jones simply informed Meyrick and Mortimer, "I'll pick them up in the morning.")

The inquest into Burnell's death was formally opened on 7 March. Jones was one of many individuals called to testify. He performed poorly on the stand, repeatedly giving conflicting testimony as to his actions on the day of the murder and being forced to admit to lying about various aspects of his testimony (on one occasion prompting the coroner to scold him and insist he tell the truth). Nonetheless, despite there being little physical evidence linking Jones to the murder, investigators believed enough circumstantial evidence existed to formally charge him with the crime. In response to this formal charge, Jones replied: "I know it looks black against me, but I never done it." He was remanded in custody until 5 April when he appeared before magistrates. On this date, a decision to try Jones for the wilful murder of Freda Burnell was reached. Bail was refused, and he was detained at HM Prison Usk to await trial.

=== Initial trial ===
Jones was brought to trial for the murder of Burnell at Monmouthshire Assizes on 21 June. The prosecution alleged that Jones had murdered Burnell inside the shed belonging to his employers on the morning of 5 February before placing her body in a sack, and placing the body in an alley close to the shed that evening. He pleaded not guilty to the charge, insisting that he had last seen Burnell when he had served her at approximately 9:05 a.m. before she had left the store.

Although Jones had contradicted himself on several occasions at the initial inquest, he remained calm when called to testify in his own defence at trial, also withstanding rigorous cross-examination. His employer, Herbert Henry Mortimer, provided him with an alibi, insisting he had heard Jones and his own son working in the store in the early morning of 5 February before the two had been sent to deliver a sack of potatoes to a customer at approximately 10 a.m., later returning to the shop where they worked for the rest of the day. Furthermore, on the third day of the trial, Jones's own father challenged the prosecutor's contention his son had placed Freda's body in the alley on the evening of her murder, insisting his son had not left the family home between the time he had returned home from work and the following morning, and that he would likely have known so had this been the case. His testimony was corroborated by his wife, who also stressed her son had always exhibited "good behaviour" towards young girls.

Despite the evidence presented at this trial clearly indicating that Burnell had most likely been killed in the shed belonging to Jones's employers, and only Harold and the Mortimer family having access to the key, the jury—having deliberated for over five hours—unanimously found Jones not guilty of murder on 23 June, instead returning a verdict of murder by person or persons unknown.

Jones walked free from the courtroom to a private and reportedly tearful reunion with his parents before being escorted to a local restaurant for a meal. At this service, Jones stood upon a table and addressed his numerous supporters with a speech in which he stated: "I thank you all. I do not hold a grudge against the people of Abertillery for the horrendous ordeal I have been put through." He subsequently returned to Abertillery in a charabanc adorned with flags and bunting to cheers from the local public, most of whom found the notion that a 15-year-old boy could sexually assault and kill a child simply inconceivable. One of those to greet Jones upon his return was a neighbour named George Little, who greeted him with the statement: "Well done, lad. We knew you didn't do it." Locals also presented Jones with a gold pocket watch in celebration of his acquittal.

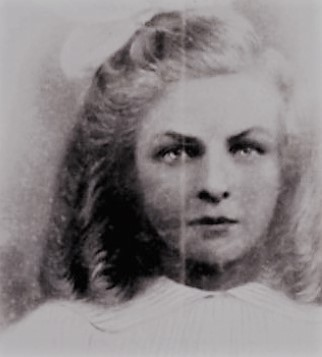
Florence Little

=== Florence Little ===
Seventeen days after his acquittal of Burnell's murder, on 8 July, Jones observed a neighbour of his named Florence Irene Little playing hopscotch with his sister, Flossie, outside his home at 10 Darran Road. He lured Little into his house on the pretext of asking her to perform an errand for his family. Inside Jones's home, she was instantly partially strangled and dragged into the kitchen, where she was beaten across the head and temple with a plank of wood before Jones suspended her head and neck over his sink, grabbed her by the hair, and cut her throat with his father's pocketknife. He then wrapped Little's head and neck in a grey army shirt before concealing her partially dressed body in the family attic. Having washed all the bloodstains he noted from the sink, walls, floor, and entrance hatch to the attic, Jones proceeded to bathe himself. (Note: Jones would subsequently inform his family that the reason he had washed his own clothes on the date of Little's murder was because he had accidentally dropped them in the bath.)

Police were notified of Little's disappearance at 11:15 p.m., and immediately conducted house-to-house searches. The simultaneous searches of nearby woodland and mountains were assisted by hundreds of local volunteers including Jones. Questioned by police as to whether he had seen Little on the day of her disappearance, Jones repeated the same lie he had earlier recited to Little's mother, Elsie, when she had called upon his house asking as to her daughter's whereabouts: that she had been at his front door, but had then simply "ran off." (Note: Following Jones's acquittal of the murder of Burnell, Little had repeatedly informed Jones of her being convinced of his guilt of the crime, although whether she had merely been joking with him is unknown.)

With Jones's father's consent, the local superintendent, Henry Lewis, and a constable searched Jones's home at 8:30 a.m. the following day as Jones himself discreetly exited the family home. Noting the trap door to the attic was bloodstained despite evident attempts to clean it, the constable conducting the search entered the attic where he discovered Little's body outstretched across the rafters. Also discovered in the police search of Jones's home were the bloodstained knife Jones had used to murder Little, a small egg-saucepan filled with a mixture of blood and water beneath the sink over which he had cut the child's throat, a bloodstained plank of wood measuring nineteen inches in length concealed beneath the family boiler, and a bloodstained table close to the entrance to the attic in which Little's body had been concealed.

Informed of the discovery in his attic, Jones's father left his property and performed a citizen's arrest on his son as he conversed with a friend in nearby Mitre Street. Jones then accompanied his father back to Darran Road, where he was placed under formal arrest. (Note: Upon performing this citizen's arrest on his own son, Phillip Jones stated: "I've got no money; I can't help you this time" before escorting his son to the family home.)

When news of Jones's arrest for the suspected murder of a second young girl reached the local public, an irate crowd of approximately 500 people gathered outside the local police station, demanding his immediate release. In response, Superintendent Lewis addressed the crowd, stating: "I have found the body of the child in the attic of Harold Jones, foully murdered, and I have arrested Harold Jones. I think this is all I can tell you and it would help us if you disperse and go to your homes."

== Second murder inquest ==
On 11 July, an inquest into the death of Little was formally opened. Again conducted by the deputy coroner for the district, the jury heard testimony on this date that Little had bled to death from the wound to her throat. Also to testify at the inquest was Elsie Little, who stated that when she had knocked at the Jones residence on the date of her daughter's disappearance, it had taken Jones (the sole occupant in the house at the time) a full two minutes to answer the door, with the explanation he had been bathing when she called. When she asked Jones whether he had seen her daughter, he had smiled before replying: "Florrie's been here, but went through the back way."

The inquest was adjourned until 23 July with the jury subsequently reaching a unanimous verdict of wilful murder against Jones after just thirty minutes' deliberation. When asked if he had anything to say in relation to this verdict and his being committed to again stand trial at Monmouthshire Assizes for a child murder, Jones—having taken copious notes of the court proceedings—reportedly jumped to his feet and proclaimed his innocence. He was again detained at HM Prison Usk to await trial. (Note: Following Jones's acquittal for the murder of Burnell, public opinion had elevated him to a status of wronged hero. According to some criminologists and authors, the public reception he had experienced following his accusal and acquittal of Burnell's murder had nurtured such a degree of vanity in Jones that he had simply murdered Little in order to experience the same public reception and legal acquittal.)

"I, Harold Jones, do confess that I wilfully and deliberately murdered Florence Irene Little on 8 July, causing her to die without preparation to meet her God. The reason for doing so being a desire to kill."

— Harold Jones's written statement, formally confessing to the murder of Florence Little. 17 September 1921.

While awaiting trial, Jones formally confessed to the murder of Little via a written statement dated 17 September. In this statement, Jones described his motive for the murder as being a "desire to kill".

== Trial and conviction ==
The trial of Jones for the murder of Little began at Monmouthshire Assizes on 1 November 1921. He was tried before Mr Justice Bray, with the prosecution contending this murder had been primarily committed due to Jones having enjoyed being "a part of the public eye" due to the attention he had received following his arrest and acquittal of Burnell's murder weeks earlier, adding that he had made evident attempts to conceal evidence of the crime within his home after the murder.

Jones's second murder trial lasted just one hour; on this occasion, he was ordered to be detained at His Majesty's pleasure. As Jones was under 16 at the time of his conviction, he could not be subjected to any form of capital punishment. (Note: In 1921, a sentence of "to be detained at His Majesty's pleasure" held a compulsory parole review every five years, although the judge at Jones's trial emphasised that in this instance, a parole hearing would only be held every ten years.)

Shortly after Jones was escorted to HM Prison Usk to begin his sentence, a second written statement was read aloud to the court. This statement—also penned prior to his trial—read: "I, Harold Jones, wilfully and deliberately murdered Freda Burnell in Mortimer's Shed on 5 February 1921. The reason for this act was a desire to kill."

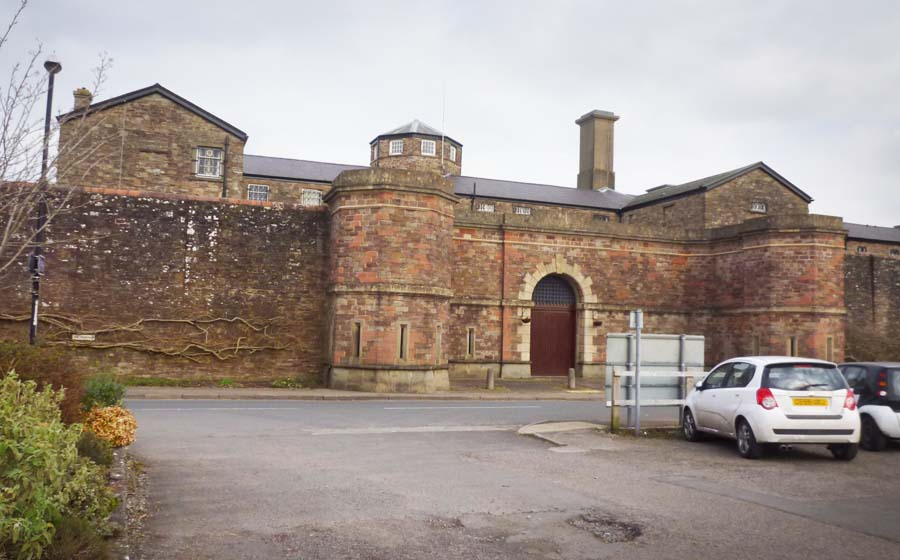
HM Prison Usk. Jones was sentenced to be detained at His Majesty's pleasure at this prison on 1 November 1921

== Later life and aftermath ==
Jones served twenty years of his imposed sentence of life imprisonment. Against the recommendations of a psychiatrist, he was released from HM Prison Wandsworth on parole on 6 December 1941 at age 35, and subsequently joined the British Army. He served in Libya during the Western Desert campaign before his service concluded in February 1946. After the Second World War, Jones briefly resided in Newport, although by 1948, he is known to have relocated to Fulham, London, using the alias Harry Stevens. He later married and fathered a child.

Jones died of bone cancer on 2 January 1971. At the time of his death, he was employed as a night watchman and living under the alias of Harry Stevens, although before he died, he told his wife the name Harold Jones should be written on his death certificate.

A number of investigators and authors believe Jones to be a likely perpetrator of the Hammersmith nude murders, a series of murders of prostitutes committed between 1964 and 1965 in West London. These theories have only abounded since Jones's death, and he was never contemporarily considered as a suspect in the case.

Shortly after the murder of Little, his employer, Herbert Mortimer, closed his shop and relocated with his family from Abertillery. Reportedly, this decision was made due to both a mixture of ostracization from locals regarding the false testimony he had delivered at the Burnell trial, and his own guilt that this false testimony had enabled Jones to subsequently remain at liberty and kill again. It is unknown where the Mortimer family initially relocated to, although the death of Herbert Henry Mortimer, at age 69, was registered in the Forest of Dean region of Gloucestershire early in 1955.

Both Burnell and Little were buried in Brynithel Cemetery. Their graves fell into a state of disrepair over the decades, although a 2017 appeal initiated by a local author named Neil Milkins to restore their graves and headstones raised more than £4,000, he having been inspired to do so after speaking to relatives of both girls, who were upset by the condition of the graves. The girls' graves were subsequently restored in 2018.

== Media ==
=== Literature ===
- Dobbs, Gary (2016). Dark Valleys: Foul Deeds Among the South Wales Valleys 1845–2016. Barnsley: Pen & Sword Books Ltd. ISBN 978-1-473-86178-7.
- Milkins, Neil (2008). Every Mother's Nightmare: Abertillery in Mourning. Abertillery: Old Bakehouse Publications. ISBN 978-1-905-96711-7.

=== Television ===
- The Crime & Investigation Network have broadcast an episode focusing on the murders committed by Harold Jones as part of their Murder Casebook series. Presented by Fred Dinenage, this 45-minute episode was first broadcast in May 2011 and features interviews with several Abertillery residents.
- The BBC have produced a documentary focusing on the murders committed by Harold Jones in which they explore his potential culpability in an unsolved series of murders committed by a perpetrator known as Jack the Stripper. Released in 2018 and titled Dark Son: The Hunt for a Serial Killer, this 90-minute documentary features Professor David Wilson.

=== Podcast ===
- The Australian crime podcast series Casefile True Crime Podcast has covered the case of Harold Jones. This episode was first broadcast on 31 July 2021.

== See also ==
- Capital punishment in the United Kingdom
- Child abduction
- Child sexual abuse
- Thrill killing

== Cited works and further reading ==
- Davis, Carol Ann (2014). Children Who Kill: Profiles of Pre-Teen and Teenage Killers. London: Allison & Busby Ltd. ISBN 978-0-749-01623-4.
- Evan, Colin (2003). A Question of Evidence: The Casebook of Great Forensic Controversies, from Napoleon to O.J. New Jersey: John Wiley & Sons Ltd. ISBN 0-471-44014-0.
- Haines, Max (1990). True Crime Stories, Book III. Toronto: Penguin Books Canada. ISBN 978-0-451-16908-2.
- Hinton, Bob (2012). South Wales Murders. Gloucestershire: History Press Limited. ISBN 978-0-752-48389-4.
- Lane, Brian (1991). The Murder Guide to Great Britain. London: Robinson Publishing Ltd. ISBN 1-854-87083-1.
- Lane, Brian; Gregg, Wilfred (1995) [1992]. The Encyclopedia of Serial Killers. New York City: Berkley Book. pp. 232–233. ISBN 0-425-15213-8.
- Mason, Fergus (2013). Exposing Jack the Stripper: A Biography of the Worst Serial Killer You've Probably Never Heard Of. London: Absolute Crime Books. ISBN 978-1-492-21043-6.
- Morris, Jim (2015). The Who's Who of British Crime: In the Twentieth Century. Gloucestershire: Amberley Publishing. ISBN 978-1-445-63924-6.
- Moss, Alan (2015). Scotland Yard's History of Crime in 100 Objects. Gloucestershire: The History Press. ISBN 978-0-750-96655-9.
- Paley, Ruth; Fowler, Simon (2005). Family Skeletons: Exploring the Lives of Our Disreputable Ancestors. Surrey: National Archives. ISBN 978-1-903-36554-0.
- Underwood, Terry (2005). Foul Deeds and Suspicious Deaths in Newport. South Yorkshire: Wharncliffe Books. ISBN 1-903-42559-X.
- Wilson, Patrick (1973). Children who Kill. London: Penguin Michael Joseph. ISBN 978-0-718-11173-1.
- Wilson, Colin; Wilson, Damon; Wilson, Rowan (1993). World Famous Murders. London: Paragon Books Ltd. ISBN 978-0-752-50122-2.
- Wynn, Douglas (1996). On Trial for Murder. London: Pan Books. ISBN 978-0-330-33947-6.
