= Jubilee Clock Tower, Usk =

Building in Usk, Monmouthshire, Wales

Jubilee Clock Tower
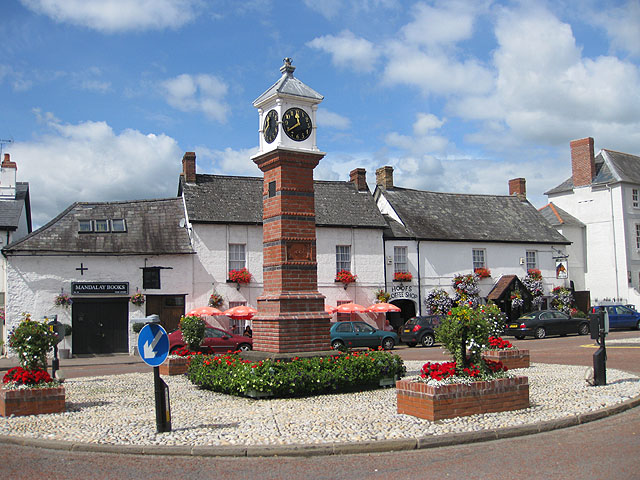
- Jubilee Clock Tower

- Location within Monmouthshire
- 51.7035°N 2.902°W
- Type: Clock tower
- Location: Usk, Monmouthshire, Wales

History
- Founded: 1887 (139 years ago)
- Built: 1887
- Built for: Golden Jubilee of Queen Victoria

Site notes
- Architectural style: Loose Gothic style
- Governing body: Usk town council

Listed Building – Grade II
- Official name: The Jubilee Clock
- Designated: 4 January 1974 (52 years ago)
- Reference no.: 2206

The Jubilee Clock Tower stands in Twyn Square in the town of Usk, in Monmouthshire, Wales. It was erected in 1887 to commemorate the Golden Jubilee of Queen Victoria. The clock is a Grade II listed structure.

== History ==
The fiftieth anniversary of Queen Victoria's accession was celebrated across Great Britain with a Golden Jubilee. Many towns and cities in her kingdoms in Britain and beyond erected memorials to commemorate the event. At Usk in Monmouthshire, a public subscription raised funds for the construction of a clock tower, which was located on the edge of Twyn Square, in the town centre. The square had formed the town's original marketplace, and the clock was sited at its northern end, in front of a United Congregational chapel designed in the early 1860s by the architectural firm of Habershon & Pite. (Note: The firm, generally known as Habershon and Fawckner, had an extensive practice throughout South Wales in the later 19th century.) In the 20th centre, the clock was moved to its current position in the centre of the square. The name of the clock tower's architect is unrecorded. In the 21st century the structure required significant restoration as its brickwork was failing, and Usk town council began fund-raising efforts to raise monies to undertake repairs.

== Description ==
The clock tower forms a square column, constructed in red brick. It stands on a plinth, and supports at its apex a four-faced clock. The structure culminates in a small crown. Commemorative plaques on three sides celebrate Victoria's reign. John Newman, in his Gwent/Monmouthshire volume in the Pevsner Buildings of Wales series, describes the clock tower as "minuscule". It was designated a Grade II listed structure in 1974.

== See also ==
- Golden Jubilee of Queen Victoria
- Jubilee clock

== Sources ==
- Newman, John (2000). Gwent/Monmouthshire. The Buildings of Wales. London: Penguin Books. ISBN 978-0-300-09630-9.
- — (2001). Glamorgan. The Buildings of Wales. London: Penguin Books. ISBN 978-0-140-71056-4. OCLC 1243807469.
