= Usk Castle =

Castle site in the town of Usk in south east Wales, United Kingdom

- Castell Brynbuga
- Usk, Monmouthshire, United Kingdom
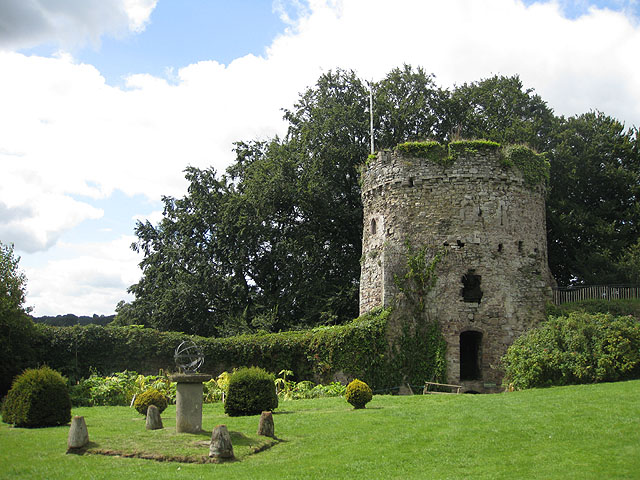
- Garrison Tower from the inner ward

Site information
- Type: Castle
- Condition: Ruined

Location
- The castle within Monmouthshire
- Coordinates: 51.7051°N 2.9033°W

Site history
- Built: 1120
- Demolished: 1536 (partially)
- Events: Battle of Usk

Listed Building – Grade I
- Official name: Usk Castle and precincts
- Designated: 16 February 1953; 73 years ago
- Reference no.: 2127

Usk Castle (Welsh: Castell Brynbuga) is a castle site in the town of Usk in central Monmouthshire, south-east Wales, United Kingdom. It was listed Grade I on 16 February 1953. Within the castle, and incorporating parts of its gatehouse, stands Castle House, a Grade I listed building in its own right.

== Location ==
Usk Castle is located immediately to the north of the present-day town on a hill overlooking the streets and main Twyn Square.

== History ==
=== Early Norman castle ===
Usk castle and town was probably laid out and established in 1120, after some of the other Norman settlements and castles of the region, such as Monmouth Castle and Abergavenny Castle. However, the site had a history of previous military, strategic, and local significance, for it was here that the Romans had established their early Legionary fortress before relocating it south to Caerleon. Usk is first mentioned in 1138 in the context of it being captured by the Welsh. It passed back into Norman hands, only to be captured by the Welsh again in 1174, as was Abergavenny, when turmoil again developed into open conflict in this area of the Welsh Marches.

=== Marcher lords ===
The Normans had to control and subjugate the region, and brought in Marcher Lord Richard Fitz Gilbert de Clare who sought to strengthen the castle's defences against Welsh attack, but he was ambushed and killed north of Abergavenny in 1136. The Welsh captured Usk Castle again in 1184. Gilbert de Clare, 7th Earl of Hertford, another holder of Usk Castle, was killed at the Battle of Bannockburn. Adam of Usk was born at the castle.

=== Duchy of Lancaster ===
After the rebellion of Owain Glyndŵr (1400–1405), the castle passed to the Duchy of Lancaster and, with stability restored, no further redevelopment or refortification was undertaken and the castle was allowed gradually to decay. It survived the English Civil War with only some slighting, and was eventually redeveloped when the gatehouse was adapted to become a house in the 1680s.

== Today ==
Today, the remains are quite substantial and include some interesting elements such as the dovecote tower. Among the more unusual features of the gardens are the site of a small narrow-gauge railway used for earth moving during excavations at the castle in the 1930s, and two Elia naval mines dating from World War II and now disarmed and set on plinths as garden ornaments.

Although the castle is a private residence of the Humphreys family, events are held throughout the summer months. The castle gardens are open to visitors on three days each week. The Early Medieval re-enactment group Regia Anglorum borrowed the castle for its Autumn training from 2009 to 2017. The castle is a Grade I listed building and a scheduled monument. Castle House is also Grade I listed.

== Gallery ==
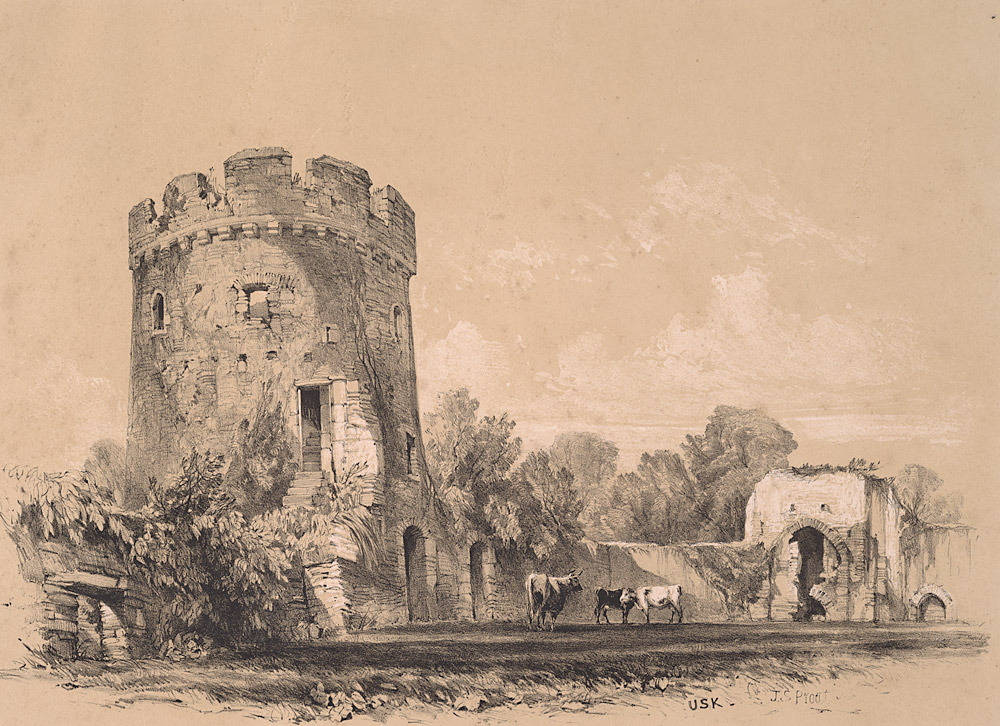
Plate from: "The Castles & Abbeys of Monmouth" J.S. Prout. 1838

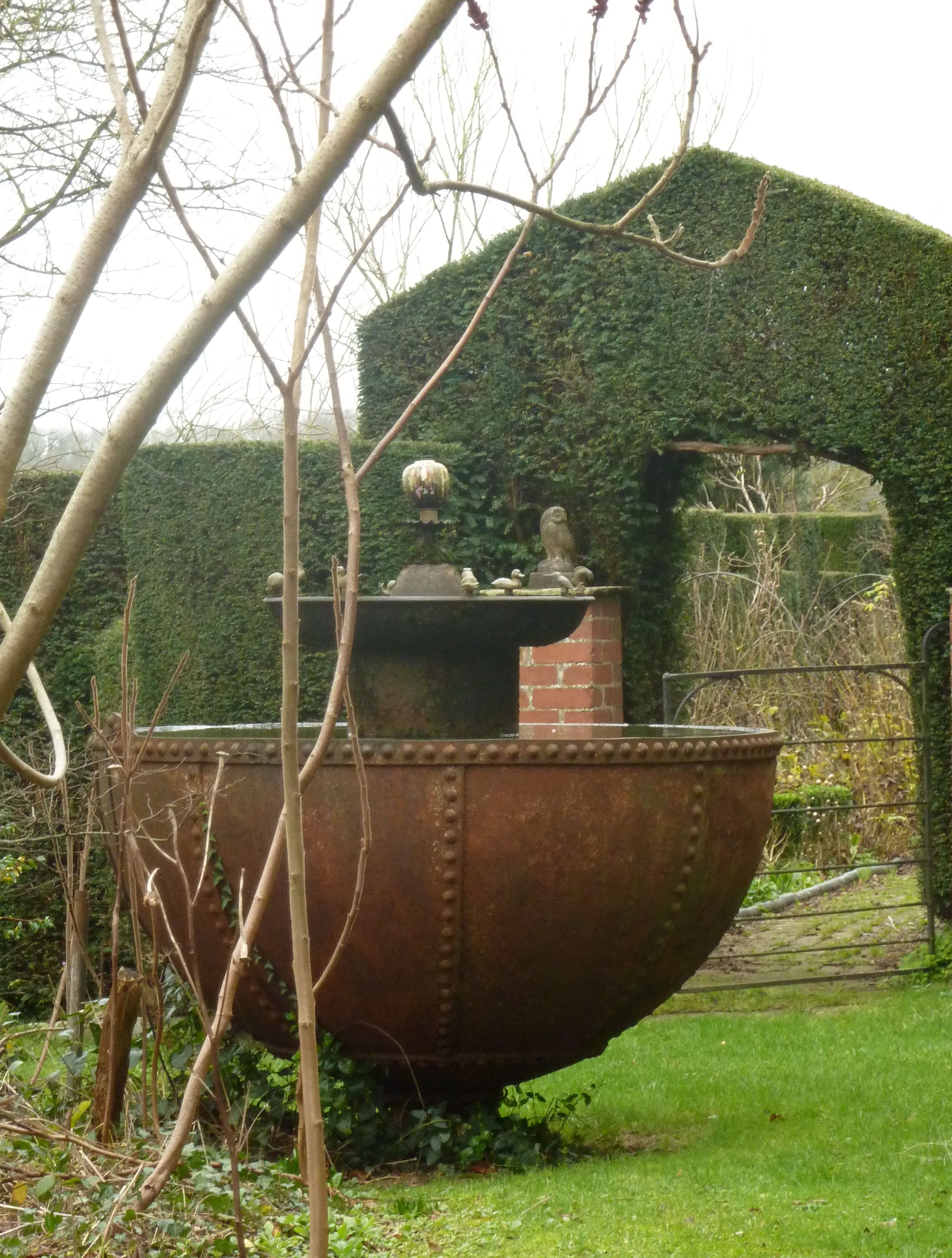
An egg-ended boiler now converted to a fountain

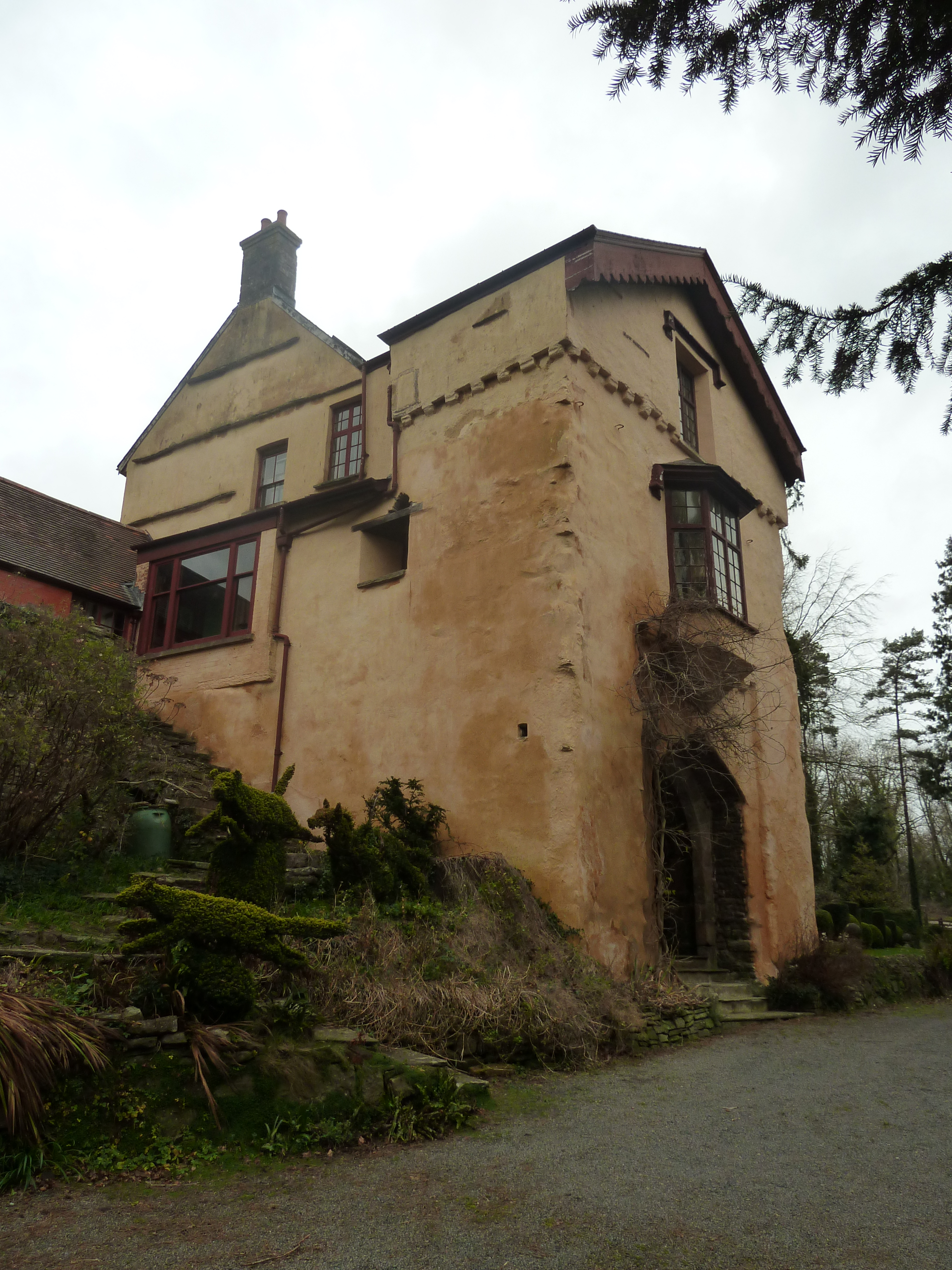
Castle House, Usk originally the castle gatehouse, now a private house
