= Sessions House, Usk =

Sessions House
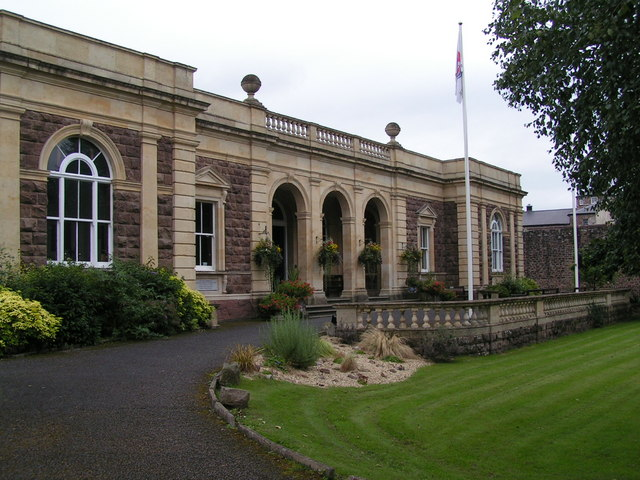
- Interactive map of the Sessions House area

General information
- Status: Grade II* listed
- Location: Usk, United Kingdom
- Coordinates: 51.7001°N 2.9010°W
- Construction started: 1875
- Completed: 1878
- Client: Monmouthshire Quarter Sessions

Design and construction
- Architect: Thomas Henry Wyatt

The Sessions House at Usk, Wales, is a Victorian courthouse by Thomas Henry Wyatt of 1877. It is a Grade II* listed building as of 4 January 1974.

== History ==
The building was commissioned to accommodate the quarter sessions for Monmouthshire which had previously been held on the first floor of the Old Town Hall in Old Market Street. The court was designed by Thomas Henry Wyatt in the Italianate style, built in mauve sandstone with dressings of Bath stone, and was officially opened by the chairman of the quarter sessions, Samuel Bosanquet, in 1877.

The design involved a symmetrical main frontage of five bays facing onto Maryport Street, with the end bays projected forward. The central section of three bays featured a loggia, formed by three round-headed arches with architraves and keystones, flanked by sash windows with triangular pediments, while the outer bays were fenestrated large round-headed windows. The bays were separated by Tuscan order pilasters and surmounted by a cornice and parapet which was broken by a balustrade above the loggia. Internally the principal rooms were the two courtrooms. A passage was built under the dock leading through to Usk Prison which stands next door.

The case of Josef Garcia, a Spanish seaman, was reputedly heard there; he was eventually tried and convicted of the murder of William and Elizabeth Watkins of Llangybi and of their three youngest children Charlotte, Alice and Frederick at the Gloucestershire Assizes in 1878. The Sessions House was also the location for the trial of Margaret Mackworth, 2nd Viscountess Rhondda, a prominent suffragette, in 1913.

Court Number 1 was badly damaged in a fire in 1944 but Court Number 2 survived with little changed. Usk Town Council reports that "There is an impressive judge's chair and the benches retain their original labels for Counsel, Solicitors, Reporters, Jury etc." The quarter sessions moved to Newport in 1950 and Court Number 1 was demolished in 1970.

The building continued to serve as a magistrates' court until June 1995 and then remained empty and deteriorating until it was purchased by Usk Town Council to mark the millennium in 1999. Following an extensive programme of refurbishment works costing £200,000, the building was re-opened by the High Sheriff of Gwent, Lady Hayman-Joyce, in May 2011. It is now used for meetings of the town council and for community use.

== Bibliography ==
- John Newman, The Buildings of Wales: Gwent/Monmouthshire, p. 593 ISBN 0-14-071053-1
