= HM Prison Usk =

Men's prison in Monmouthshire, Wales

HMP Usk
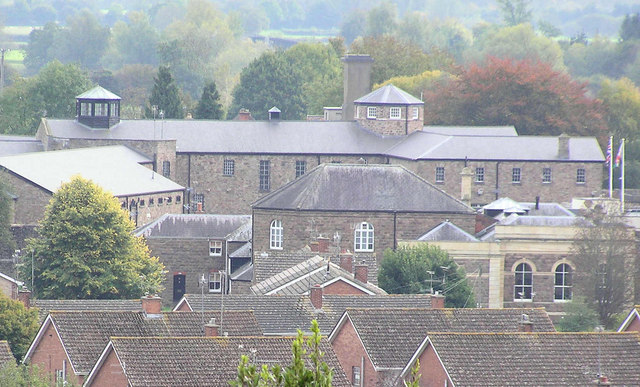
- Interactive map of HMP Usk
- Location: Usk, Monmouthshire, Wales; 51°41′58″N 2°54′01″W
- Security class: Adult Male/Category C
- Population: 280 (March 2020)
- Opened: 1844
- Managed by: HM Prison Services
- Governor: Rob Denman
- Website: Usk at justice.gov.uk

HM Prison Usk (Welsh: Carchar Brynbuga EF) is a Category C men's prison, located in Maryport Street in Usk, Monmouthshire, Wales. The prison is operated by His Majesty's Prison Service, and jointly managed with the nearby HMP Prescoed.

== History ==
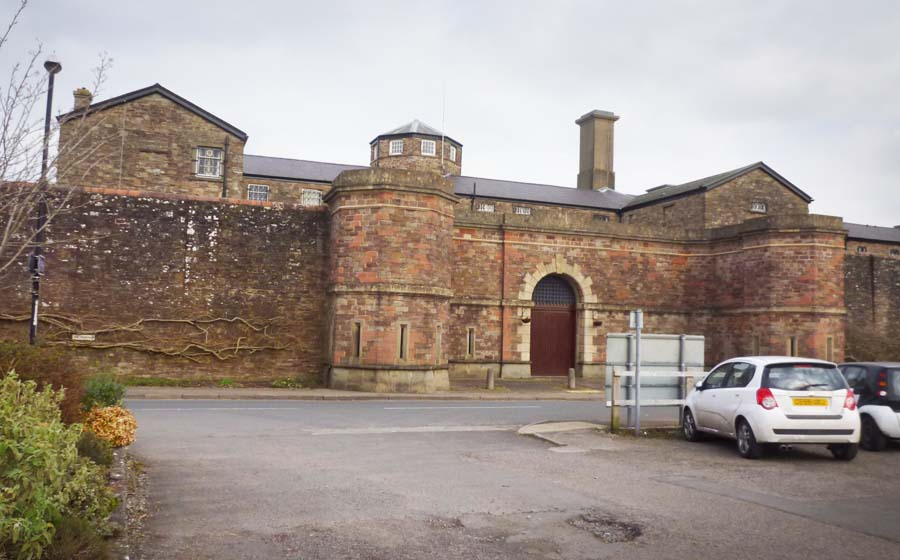
Main gates to the old gaol, Maryport Street

Usk Prison was built in 1841/2 in red sandstone and extended in 1868. It opened in 1844 as a House of Correction, and after the addition of other buildings in 1870 the establishment became the Monmouthshire County Gaol, superseding the Monmouth County Gaol in Monmouth. It retained that role until 1922 when it closed, reopening in 1939 as a borstal. It continued as a borstal until 1964 when it became a Detention Centre. In 1983 Usk became a Youth Custody Centre and from 1988 to 1990 a Young Offenders Institution. In May 1990, Usk became an Adult Category C prison for Vulnerable Prisoners (mainly sex offenders) and it continues in that role today.

The building received a Grade II* heritage listing in 1974, being a largely unaltered Victorian gaol.

In May 2003 a special workshop was set up in Usk Prison, in conjunction with a local charity. Prisoners in the workshop worked at removing fake logos from clothing, CDs and videos which have been seized by trading standards officers. The rebranded goods were then sold in local charity shops in the region. The project was the first of its kind to be set up in Wales. However, by March 2008 this had been closed down.

In July 2003 Usk Prison (along with its satellite prison Prescoed) was described as of the top five performing prisons in England and Wales. The statistics were published by the Prison Service as part of a league table - the first time that prisons had been ranked in this way.

In August 2008 an inspection report from Her Majesty's Chief Inspector of Prisons stated that standards at both Usk and Prescoed prisons remained good, despite dips in performance. The report said that the two prisons were safe and clean, and that relationships between staff and prisoners were "relaxed". Racial equality work was also found to be good, as was the education and training provision for inmates at both sites. The report found, however, that staff were not sufficiently trained, and that there was a shortage of trained psychologists.

== Present day ==
Usk is a Category C closed prison for adult male vulnerable prisoners (mainly sex offenders, convicted police officers, ranking civil workers which are convicted to serve a term or sentence). Accommodation at the prison consists of three main wings, which radiate off a central rotunda. The majority of the cells are bunked double-occupancy, all with integral sanitation. Good quality and well-screened showers are available on all residential units. Additional accommodation is located on Comber Unit (a 20-bed ground floor wing opened in May 2003). Allocation to Comber Unit is by application after 6 months as an Enhanced Prisoner. All prisoners have access to in cell TV with 9 digital Freeview channels, and access to limited disabled facilities. There is wheelchair access to most ground floor areas such as the Refectory and Chapel.

The prison offers a range of education courses covering basic skills to higher education. A purpose-built Vocational Training Centre offers City and Guilds courses and qualifications in woodcraft, plasterwork and bricklaying.

Unlike most other UK prisons, there is no staffed Visitors' Centre or children's play area. In the visiting room there are vending machines providing hot & cold drinks and snacks. Baby changing facilities are available. The Visiting Room allows only ten prisoner visits per day.

Between 1999 and 2011 the court room, and the historic Sessions House next door, were the subject of a restoration project costing £200,000. The building re-opened as the base of Usk Town Council.

== Notable inmates ==
- Ali Dizaei
- Harold Jones
