= Burrium =

Coordinates: 51.702°N 2.903°W

Map of modern-day Usk, showing the lines of the ramparts of the Roman Legionary Fortress of Burrium. Larger rectangle is the fortress of 55 AD. Brown dotted lines show the later (75 AD onwards) boundary of the smaller enclosure possibly used as a store and ironworks.
Numerous sites within the fortress have had archaeological excavations, but the timber post-holes and other remains have given little on the functions of particular sites. The selection of grey dots are just some of those sites showing Legionary buildings from both phases of its use.
1 Excavationas at Primary School site, with various buildings between two Roman streets, from early and late phases of the fortress.
2 Excavations of the Via Principalis, the main east-west road across the fortress
3 Excavated timber buildings of unknown functions.
4 1st century beam-slot and posthole/pit at Kings' Head
5 Excavation of timber structure and cobbled path or yard

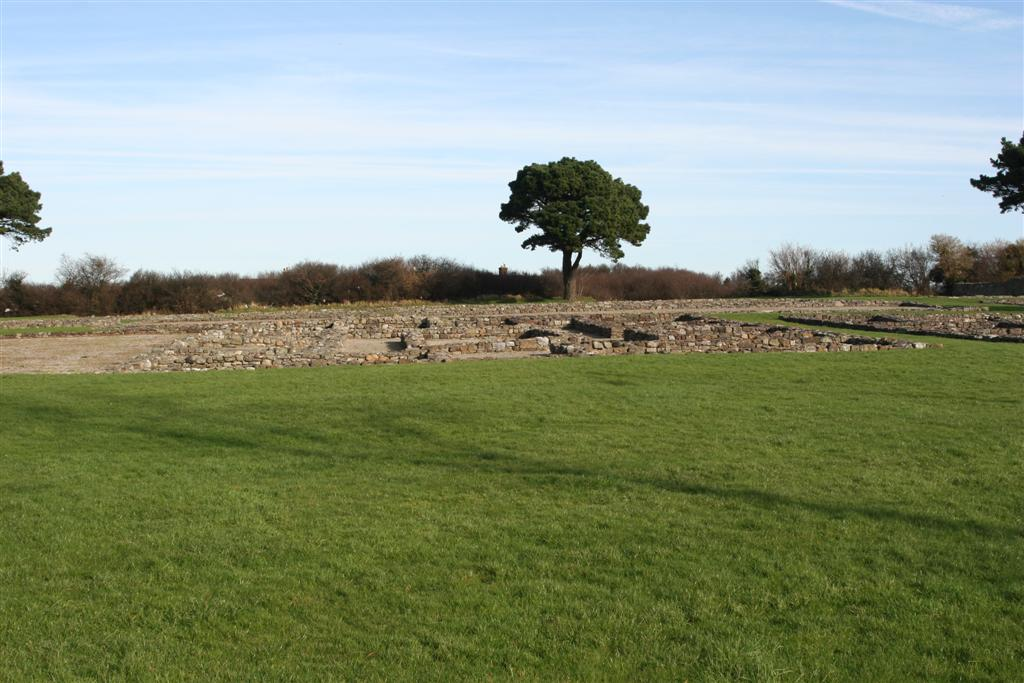
segontium.jpg

Burrium was a legionary fortress in the Roman province of Britannia Superior or Roman Britain. Its remains today lie beneath the town of Usk in Monmouthshire, south east Wales.

The Romans founded the 48 acres (19 ha) fortress around AD 55, probably for the Legio XX Valeria Victrix (20th Legion) and perhaps an additional ala of 500 cavalrymen. Earth and timber defences surrounded a number of legionary barracks. The fort was key to the conquest of the Silures, a tribe very resistant to the imposition of Roman rule in Roman Wales, but in AD 66 the legion was transferred to Viroconium Cornoviorum (at Wroxeter) and its base in Wales was largely abandoned, but continued with a smaller garrison until 74-75 AD. It was briefly replaced by a works depot for ironworking. The surrounding vicus seems not to have developed into a small town, although it may have had an official mansio.
