= Illustrated Usk Observer =

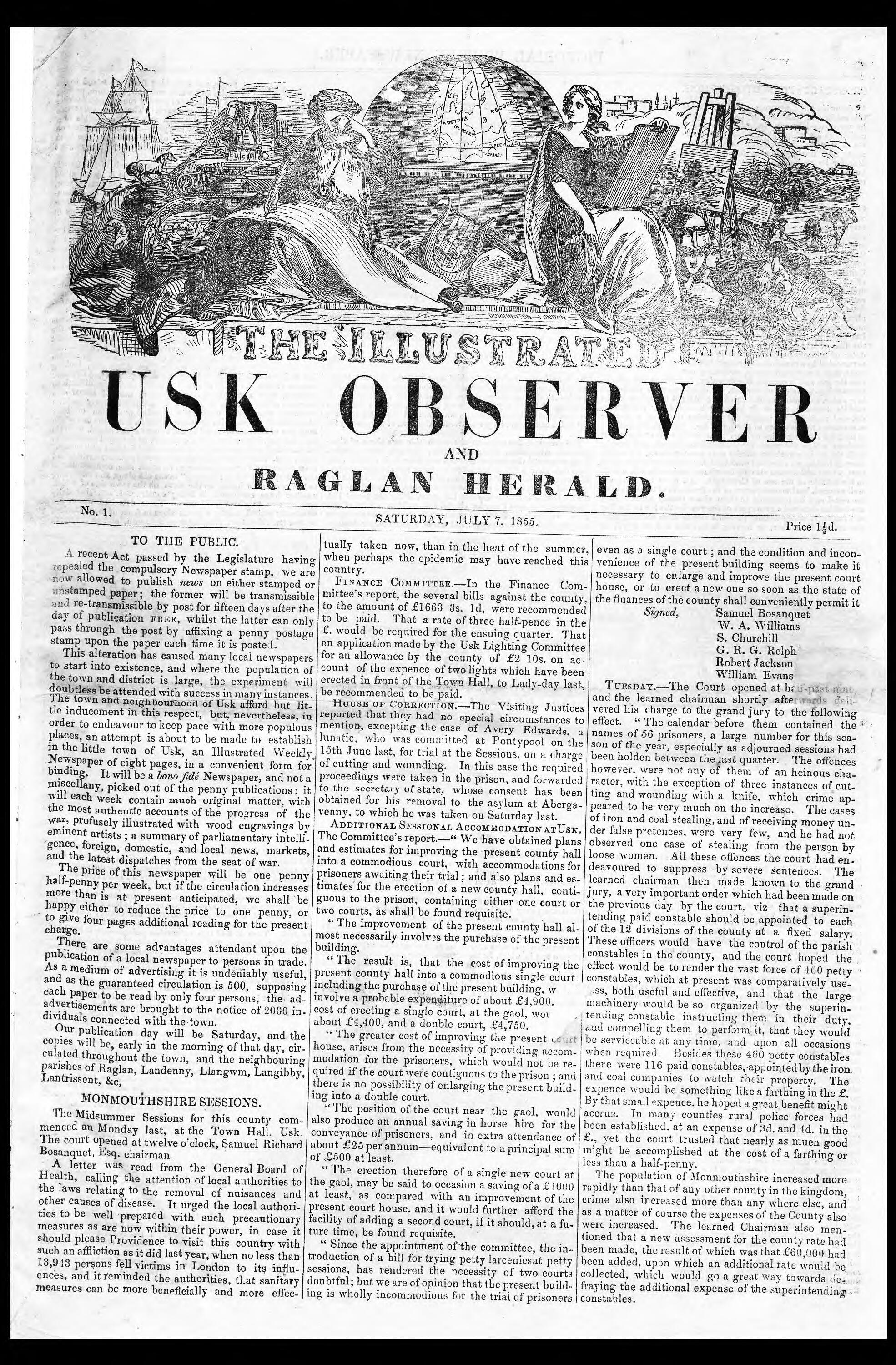
The Illustrated Usk Observer Jul 7 1855

The Illustrated Usk Observer (established in 1855) was a weekly English language newspaper with a conservative editorial point-of-view. It contained reports focusing on local news and information, with a special focus on agricultural matters and family interests. It was later succeeded by 'The Usk Observer'. Associated titles: The Usk Observer (1855–1866).
