= Mark XVII contact naval mine =

Mark XVII contact mine
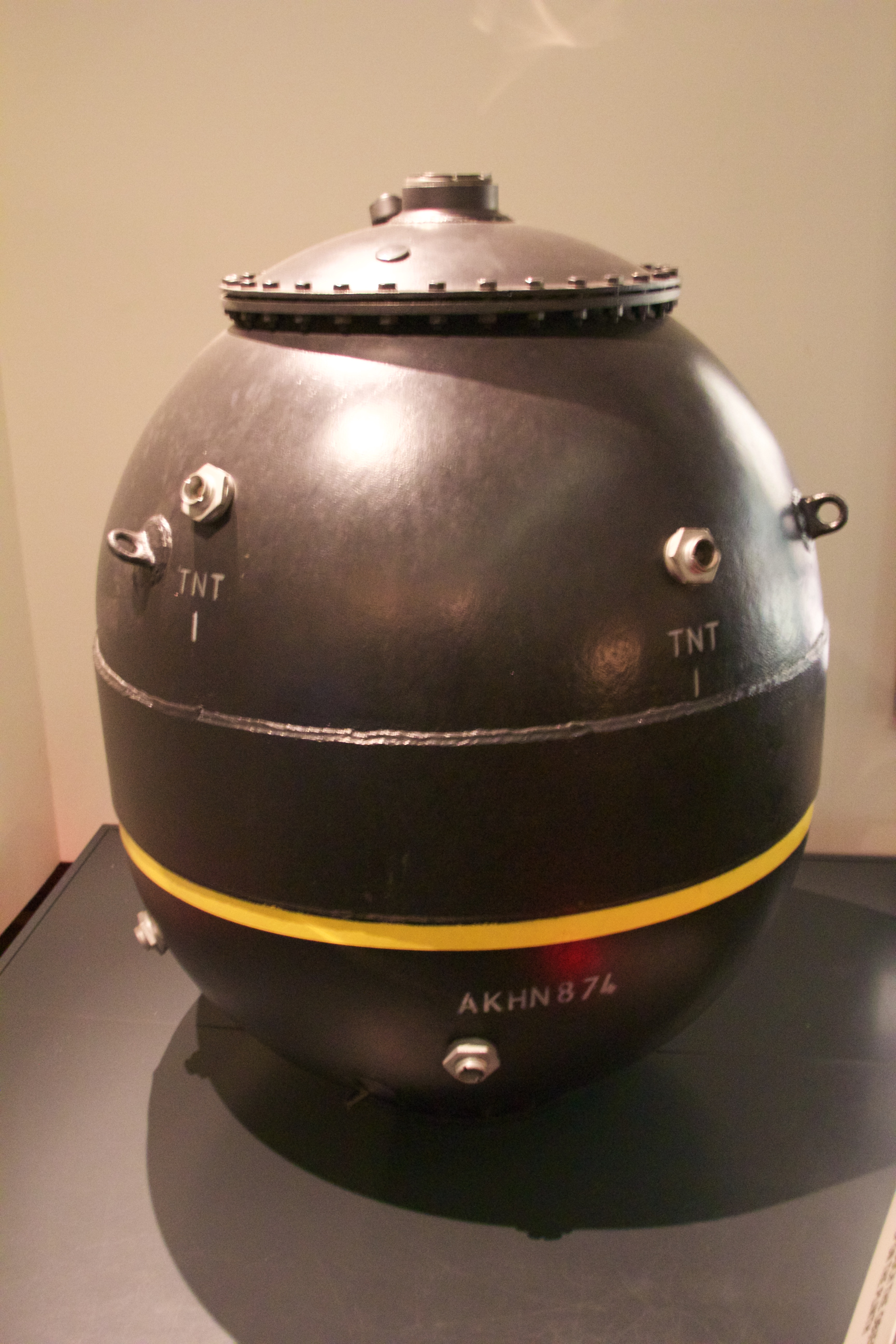
- Deactivated mk XVII contact mine at the British Imperial War Museum North(no switch horns triggers)
- Type: Naval mine
- Place of origin: United Kingdom

Service history
- Used by: United Kingdom
- Wars: World War II

Specifications
- Height: 48 inches(121.92 cm)
- Diameter: 40 inches(101.6 cm)
- Filling: Amatol (50/50 mixture)
- Filling weight: 320lb,450lb or 500lb
- Detonation mechanism: 11 switch horn triggers

The Mark XVII naval contact mine, triggered through contact with a ship, was the standard British contact naval mine during World War II.

== History ==
=== Origins ===
The Mark XVII using new switch horn triggers was an evolution from the previous Hertz horn based contact mines, which entered service in 1917 during World War I. The Hertz horn triggers in British naval mines had been copied from German World War I contact naval mines whose Hertz horn triggers were more reliable than their British equivalents.

Before this, British mines were operated by arms (first mines). Later, long levers (invented by Captain G. Elia of the Italian Navy) were used so that the lever would rotate and detonate the mine when struck by a ship. After long levers, Hertz horn triggers for mines were developed from captured WWI German mines and started to enter service in 1917. These 'horns' protruded from the top half of the mine and contained sulphuric acid. When struck by a ship, the horn would break and release the acid into a battery, detonating the explosive.

The Mark XVII came into use in the interwar years. These were triggered by switches in the horns making contact with ships and being triggered as a result, rather than by the acid release trigger of Hertz horns. Early interwar when the parallel development of Hertz and switch horn mines were taking place, Hertz horn mines were designated as type H and switch horns as type T (trigger). Later in the interwar period, the development of Hertz and switch horn mines were merged into one project. This is why the MK XVII contact mine does not have a type T designation, as at that time only one series of mines were being developed and type designations were not needed.

=== Service ===
This was the standard British contact mine of WWII and was heavily used. In WWII, British forces used mines offensively to mine enemy waters and sink enemy ships, such as in Operation Wilfred. British forces used mines defensively to stop enemy ships from accessing certain areas through the mined routes. An example of this is the British mines in the Iceland and Faroe passages which would have been used to deny access to these passages to German ships. Offensive mining in enemy waters had some success in blowing up enemy ships, but defensive mines completely failed in this regard with 170,000 laid defensive mines blowing up only one U-Boat. However, defensive mines would have also denied routes to enemy ships, so this must also be considered when judging their effectiveness. The MK XVII contact mines are said to have been deployed by HMS Abdiel (N21). This ship's minelaying WWII predecessors were also likely to have deployed MK XVII contact mines at some point in their careers.

== Design ==
=== Triggers ===
The MK XVII contact mine is triggered by a ship coming into contact with its switch horns. These are placed all around the mine to increase its reliability. More switch horns around the mine will increase the chance a ship will come into contact with the mine's horn triggers. When a ship comes into contact with a switch horn, the switch is activated and detonates the mine.

=== Explosive content ===
Most WWII British mines had a half mix of ammonium nitrate and TNT due to shortages of TNT and RDX, which resulted in a lower quality explosive. Later on, 20% more aluminium was added to improve the explosive. The explosive charge of a MK XVII contact mine could be either 320lb, 450lb, or 500lb of explosives.

=== Laying depth ===
The mines could be laid up to 500 fathoms deep.

=== Sinker ===
The sinker used to anchor the mine is shown reference 5
