= Usk =

Town in Monmouthshire, Wales

Usk: Welsh: Brynbuga
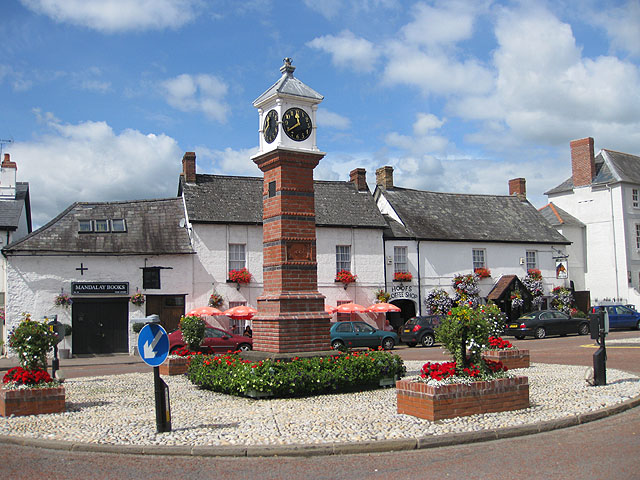
- Twyn Square and clock tower

- Location within Monmouthshire
- Population: 2,834
- OS grid reference: SO375005
- Community: Usk
- Principal area: Monmouthshire
- Preserved county: Gwent
- Country: Wales
- Sovereign state: United Kingdom
- Post town: USK
- Postcode district: NP15
- Dialling code: 01291
- Police: Gwent
- Fire: South Wales
- Ambulance: Welsh
- UK Parliament: Monmouthshire
- Senedd Cymru – Welsh Parliament: Monmouth
- List of places UK Wales Monmouthshire 51.704°N 2.902°W Map of the community

Usk (Welsh: Brynbuga) is a town and community in Monmouthshire, Wales, 10 miles (16 km) northeast of Newport. It is located on the River Usk, which is spanned by an arched stone bridge at the western entrance to the town. Usk Castle, above the town, overlooks the ancient crossing point. It developed as a small market town, with some industry including the making of Japanware, and with a notable prison built in 1841–42. In recent years, Usk has become known for its history of success in Britain in Bloom competitions, winning the "Wales in Bloom" competition 35 times in a row between 1982 and 2016. The resident population of the town in 2011 was 2,834, decreasing to roughly 2,600 in 2021. 6.8% of the population are recorded as being able to speak Welsh.

== Toponymy ==
The town's English name derives from the River Usk, on which it lies. Its Welsh name, Brynbuga, means "hill of Buga", although the identity of Buga is unknown. It was known to the Romans as Burrium or Bulleum, which incorporates another personal name, Burros (meaning "stout").

== History ==
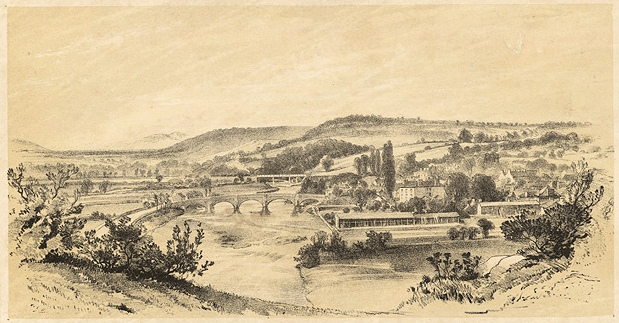
Usk and river from Llanbadoc Rock, 1860

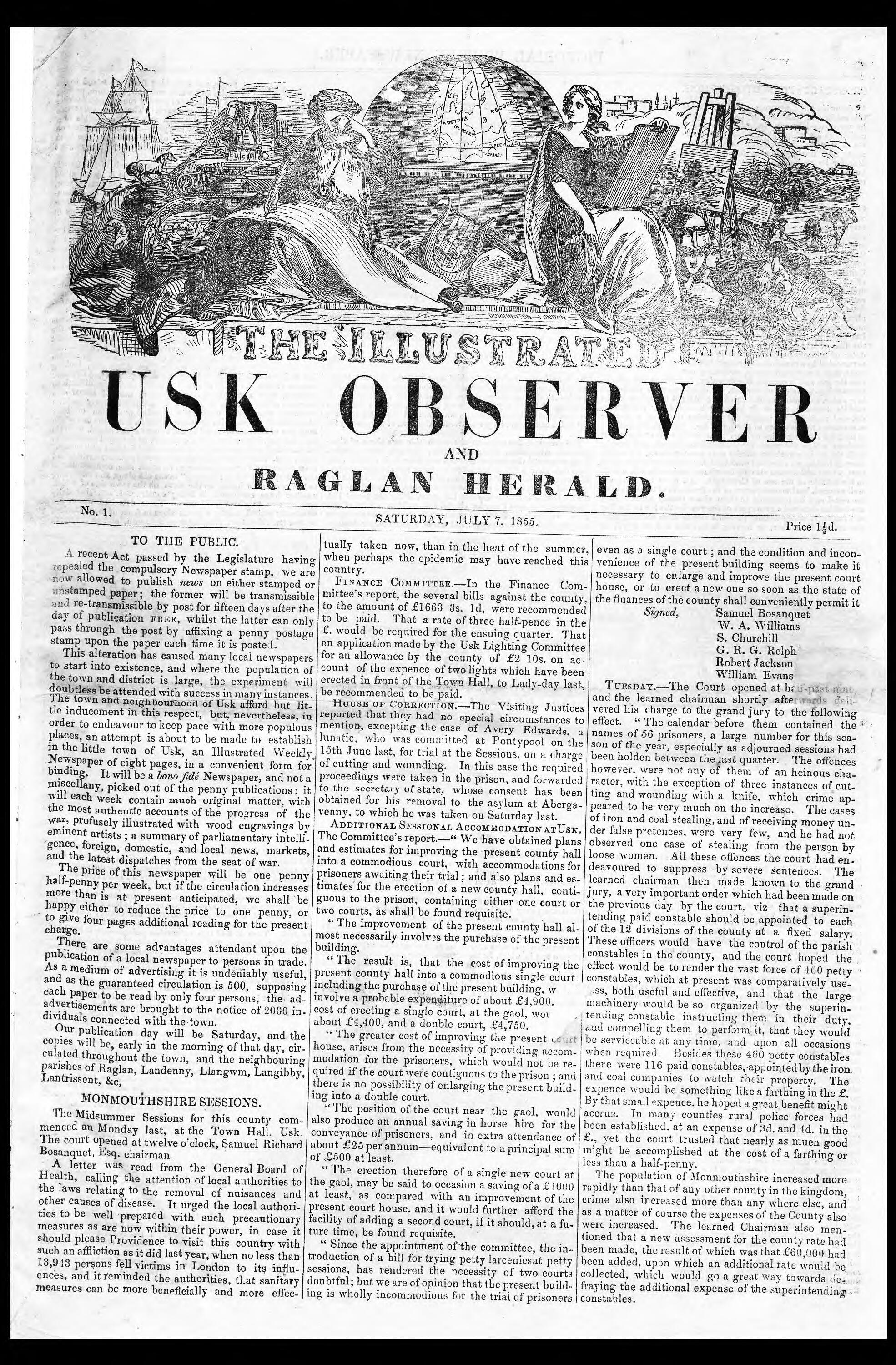
Front page of the earliest surviving copy of the newspaper The Illustrated Usk Observer, 7 July 1855

=== Roman times ===
The Roman legionary fortress of Burrium was founded on the River Usk by the military commander Aulus Didius Gallus, around AD 55. He moved his XX Valeria Victrix legion into the area from its earlier base at Glevum (Gloucester). It was the earliest legionary fortress in Wales and although the site was constricted by hills, subject to flooding, and not on a navigable river, it did offer good communications inland up the river. The fortress at Usk was surrounded by ramparts and covered a large area. However, by around 75 AD, its disadvantages had become apparent and the Romans relocated their permanent military base further south to Caerleon, leaving only a small auxiliary fort and civilian settlement at Usk.

The Roman remains are buried on the southern side of Usk. Many of the Roman finds from Usk are now housed in the National Roman Legion Museum in Caerleon.

=== Norman times ===
After the fortress was abandoned, it continued to be occupied as a civilian settlement, with evidence of ironworking. The Normans also realised Usk's geographical and military importance within the region, and the powerful de Clare family built Usk Castle as part of their plans for controlling the area's resources and people. The castle, now hidden from view by surrounding trees planted in the early 20th century, is one of the few castles still privately owned and occupied.

The town was laid out in rectangular building plots, centred on the market square. Markets were originally held in Twyn Square, twyn being a Welsh word for "hillock".

=== Charters ===
The town was owned by the Earls of Gloucester and Hereford until 1314, when it was claimed by the Earl of Ulster through marriage. It descended in the female line to Lionel Duke of Clarence, the son of Edward III and through him to Mortimer Earl of March, Marshal of England. His nephew, Richard Duke of York then inherited and it became a favourite residence of his. At the death of Richard III in 1485 it was given by Henry VII to his son Arthur, Prince of Wales. In 1544 it became part of the dowry of Queen Katherine Parr and on the death of Catherine it was granted by Edward VI to the Earl of Pembroke. Its location meant that it was inevitably frequently caught up in the border disputes between the English and the Welsh in this section of the Welsh Marches.

=== The Welsh Revolt ===
Usk was the birthplace of Adam of Usk. His chronicle records the 'Welsh Revolt' in 1403, when Owain Glyndŵr burned Usk to the ground while gaining control of much of South Wales from the English under King Henry IV and his son, later to become King Henry V. The important Battle of Pwll Melyn in 1405 occurred immediately north of Usk Castle, when English forces routed their Welsh opponents, causing much loss of life, including that of Owain's brother Tudur. After their defeat, three hundred Welsh prisoners were executed in front of the castle. In 2005 the 600th anniversary of the battle of Pwll Melyn was commemorated by a son-et-lumiere show at the castle.

The town appears as "Uck" and "Branbuga" on the Cambriae Typus map of 1573.

=== The 16th and 17th centuries ===
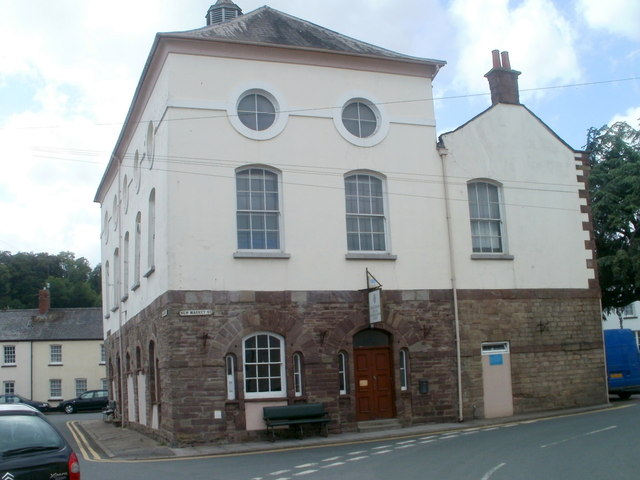
The Old Town Hall

The Great House of the town, later subdivided into smaller units, was built on Old Market Street in the mid-16th century for the Williams family. Its original entrance was at the rear of the present building, and faced onto gardens and meadows. Though much altered, the building retains many original features including chimney stacks and decorative plaster ceilings.

The town market was moved from Twyn Square in 1598 to a location closer to the river, at New Market Street. The Old Town Hall was built on the street at the same time; this was later partially rebuilt at several times during the 19th century, and is now used by the Royal British Legion.

In 1621 the wealthy Midlands wool merchant Roger Edwards, the owner of Allt-y-Bela in Llangwm, founded Usk Grammar School.

=== The 18th and 19th centuries ===
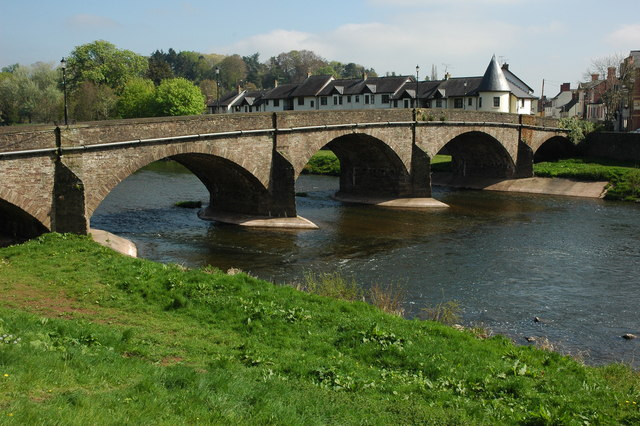
The bridge over the River Usk, built in 1746–1752, to a design by William Edwards

The first stone bridge at Usk, replacing one of wood, was built to the designs of Welsh architect William Edwards. Unlike the bridge downstream at Caerleon, it withstood the great floods of 1795. The bridge was strengthened and widened in 1836, but two of its arches were destroyed by floods in 1877 and later replaced.

In 1769 a Congregational chapel was built in Twyn Square. It was rebuilt, in the Gothic style in 1863, with a turret for one bell and room for 400 worshippers. The Jubilee Town Clock was originally positioned directly in front of the church.

From the late 18th century, Usk became well known for the high quality of its japanware, a process of decorating metals by applying a lacquer to tinplate. The process, known as Pontypool japan, was first developed in the west by Thomas Allgood of nearby Pontypool and was taken on in Usk in 1763 by his grandsons Thomas and Edward Allgood. Products from Usk included tin trays, jardinières, and coal boxes. However output declined with changing fashions in the 19th century, and the last Usk japanware was produced in 1860 on the site of what is now Bunning's builders' merchants.

Usk was a thriving market town in the first part of the 19th century, when many of its existing buildings were constructed, and into the Victorian era, although its population fell in the second half of the century as a result of agricultural depression.

== Amenities ==
The road to Monmouth (the A472) passes Twyn Square, a large town square, where the clock tower was erected to commemorate the Golden Jubilee of Queen Victoria in 1887.

"Usk Island" is a park at the edge of the river ('island' is a literal translation of the Welsh 'ynys' meaning a river meadow). The park is mostly laid to grass, with surrounding woodland. It also has a substantial adventure playground. Usk Tennis Club was Tennis Wales "Club of the Year" for 2006.

The BBC reported in May 2014 that Wales' rarest tree, Ley's Whitebeam (Sorbus leyana), would be planted in Usk to honour the man who rediscovered them, Peter Charlesworth.

=== Priory Church of St Mary, Usk and the Priory Gatehouse ===
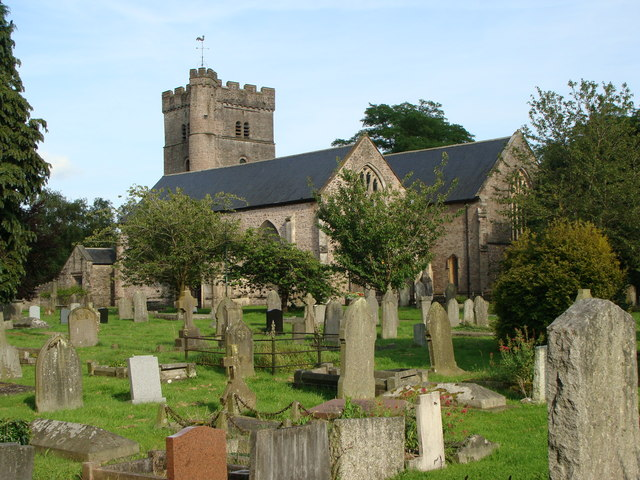
Priory Church of St Mary

The parish church of St Mary originated as part of the Benedictine priory founded by Richard de Clare in the 12th century. The northern aisle of the convent church was added in the 13th century for the use of the town's residents, and after the Dissolution of the nunnery in 1536 the nave was also incorporated as part of the parish church. The original 12th-century crossing remains, as does an original font. Most of the structure derives from the 14th century, although the two porches and the notably fine rood screen date from the 15th century and were probably built for William Herbert, Earl of Pembroke, who was constable of the castle. The church was partly rebuilt and extended c. 1844 by the architect T. H. Wyatt, and further restored and extended in 1899–1900.

The priory's poor finances were improved in 1404 by a Papal indulgence obtained by Adam of Usk, who was buried beside the priory altar; there is a brass monument to him in the church, with an inscription in the form of a cywydd (a Welsh poetic metre from c. 13th century). Usk later became a centre for pilgrims. The gatehouse of the original convent survives beside the main entrance to the churchyard. However, most of the priory buildings, such as the cloister and chapter house, were destroyed and their stones later used in town buildings.

=== Sessions House ===
The Sessions House is a Victorian courthouse by Thomas Henry Wyatt of 1877. It has been designated a Grade II* listed building since 4 January 1974.

=== Prison ===
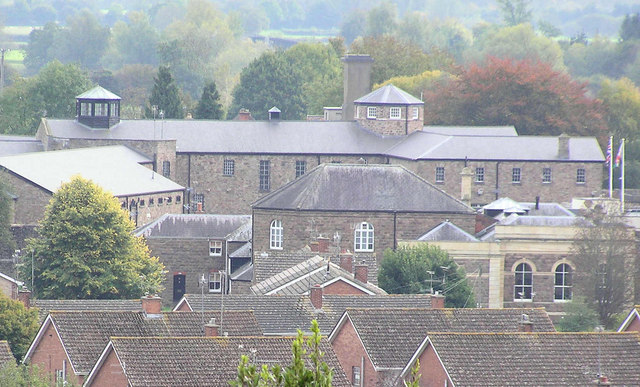
Usk Prison seen over the rooftops from Usk Castle

His Majesty's Prison Usk is situated close to the centre of the town. It was built in 1842–44 to a Victorian 'rotunda' design, similar to that of Pentonville in London. The architect was T. H. Wyatt. It became the County Gaol for Monmouthshire in 1870, and operated until 1922. After being closed for more than a decade, it was reopened in 1939, adapted for use as a borstal to hold youth offenders. In 1990 it was adapted again for use as a Category C establishment for vulnerable prisoners, including sex offenders.

The sister establishment of HM Prison Usk is HM Prison Prescoed, which is located 3 mi (4.8 km) to the south-west of the town, towards Pontypool.

=== Usk Rural Life Museum ===
The Rural Life Museum is housed in a former malt barn, possibly of mediaeval origin, on New Market Street. Run by volunteers, it focuses on life in the area as it was between the mid-19th and mid-20th centuries. It is open to visitors between April and October.

=== Usk Natural Burial Meadow ===
Usk Natural Burial Meadow is a 14-acre (5.7 ha) site in Usk Castle Chase that offers full interments, and the burial or scattering of cremation ashes. The site is located 1 mile (1.6 km) from the town centre along Monmouth Road and was established in 2005. It was awarded Cemetery of the Year in 2008 by the Institute of Cemetery and Crematorium Management (ICCM).

=== Usk in Bloom ===
Local residents formed the Usk in Bloom committee in 1981. The voluntary committee aims to improve the local environment by the imaginative planting of trees, shrubs, bulbs and floral displays; and to foster partnerships with other organisations and residents for work on environmental issues in the town. The town has won the "Wales in Bloom" competition for 35 times in a row between 1982 and 2016; won the "large village" category of "Britain in Bloom" four times; and twice represented the United Kingdom in European competitions.

=== Usk Brass Band ===
Usk has a brass band, which has represented the town at the National Finals of Great Britain regularly since registering as a competing band in 2014.

=== Fishing and accommodation ===
Usk is a centre for recreational fishing, with the River Usk being known for its salmon fishing.

The town has a number of inns and hotels, including the Castle Inn in Twyn Square, the Glen Yr-Afon Hotel on the Pontypool Road and the Three Salmons Hotel on Bridge Street.

== Climate ==
Climate data for Usk (1991–2020)
| Month | Jan | Feb | Mar | Apr | May | Jun | Jul | Aug | Sep | Oct | Nov | Dec | Year |
|---|---|---|---|---|---|---|---|---|---|---|---|---|---|
| Record high °C (°F) | 14.5 (58.1) | 16.7 (62.1) | 21.1 (70.0) | 24.2 (75.6) | 27.5 (81.5) | 33.5 (92.3) | 34.1 (93.4) | 32.4 (90.3) | 27.8 (82.0) | 24.5 (76.1) | 19.0 (66.2) | 16.0 (60.8) | 34.1 (93.4) |
| Mean daily maximum °C (°F) | 8.4 (47.1) | 9.0 (48.2) | 11.4 (52.5) | 14.6 (58.3) | 17.9 (64.2) | 20.5 (68.9) | 22.5 (72.5) | 22.1 (71.8) | 19.5 (67.1) | 15.3 (59.5) | 11.5 (52.7) | 8.8 (47.8) | 15.2 (59.4) |
| Daily mean °C (°F) | 5.1 (41.2) | 5.4 (41.7) | 7.1 (44.8) | 9.4 (48.9) | 12.5 (54.5) | 15.2 (59.4) | 17.1 (62.8) | 16.7 (62.1) | 14.3 (57.7) | 11.0 (51.8) | 7.8 (46.0) | 5.4 (41.7) | 10.6 (51.1) |
| Mean daily minimum °C (°F) | 1.7 (35.1) | 1.7 (35.1) | 2.8 (37.0) | 4.2 (39.6) | 7.0 (44.6) | 9.8 (49.6) | 11.6 (52.9) | 11.2 (52.2) | 9.2 (48.6) | 6.7 (44.1) | 4.0 (39.2) | 2.0 (35.6) | 6.0 (42.8) |
| Record low °C (°F) | −14.0 (6.8) | −12.8 (9.0) | −10.6 (12.9) | −5.3 (22.5) | −3.5 (25.7) | −0.6 (30.9) | 2.8 (37.0) | 1.1 (34.0) | −2.2 (28.0) | −5.2 (22.6) | −7.3 (18.9) | −12.2 (10.0) | −14.0 (6.8) |
| Average precipitation mm (inches) | 127.3 (5.01) | 94.0 (3.70) | 74.9 (2.95) | 67.7 (2.67) | 73.9 (2.91) | 69.1 (2.72) | 66.2 (2.61) | 82.8 (3.26) | 75.9 (2.99) | 125.7 (4.95) | 121.0 (4.76) | 132.2 (5.20) | 1,110.7 (43.73) |
| Average precipitation days (≥ 1.0 mm) | 14.6 | 11.6 | 11.3 | 10.6 | 10.4 | 9.2 | 9.1 | 10.1 | 9.8 | 13.2 | 14.2 | 13.9 | 137.9 |
| Mean monthly sunshine hours | 51.3 | 75.0 | 110.6 | 158.1 | 187.1 | 176.8 | 185.3 | 178.9 | 133.4 | 95.4 | 59.3 | 47.0 | 1,458.4 |
Source 1: Met Office
Source 2: Starlings Roost Weather

== Demographics ==
The resident population of the town in 2011 was 2,834. In 2021, the population of Usk was recorded 2,600 (rounded to the nearest 100). Of this, 30.3% were between the ages of 45 and 64, above the county average of 29.7%. The largest ethnic group is White who make up 96.9% of the population, matching the county average, with the second largest being Asian/Asian British with 1.7% of the population, above the county average of 1.3%. The largest religious group is Christianity at 51.4%, above the county average of 48.7%, with the second largest being No religion with 39.5% of the population, below the county average of 43.4%.

6.8% of the population are recorded as being able to speak Welsh.

== Administration ==
The town is administered by Monmouthshire County Council and a town council. The Usk electoral ward, coterminous with the community, is represented by one county councillor.

== Notable people ==
The town was the birthplace of the priest and chronicler Adam of Usk, around 1352. In 1679 Usk was the site of the martyrdom of Jesuit father David Lewis, who was hanged for his alleged part in the fictitious Popish Plot conspiracy of Titus Oates.

In 1823, Llanbadoc, just across the river from Usk, Alfred Russel Wallace was born, a notable proponent of the theory of evolution. In November 2021 Bill Bailey, a fervent admirer, unveiled a bust of Wallace, sculpted by Felicity Crawley, in Twyn Square.

== Neighbouring areas ==
The South Wales Gliding Club is located near Gwernesney, about three miles east of the town. About 3 miles (4.8 km) west of Usk is the 1,000-acre (400 ha) site of the munitions production facility of BAE Systems at Glascoed.

== Gallery ==
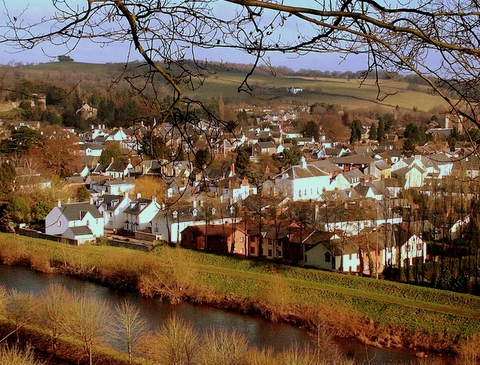
General view of the town

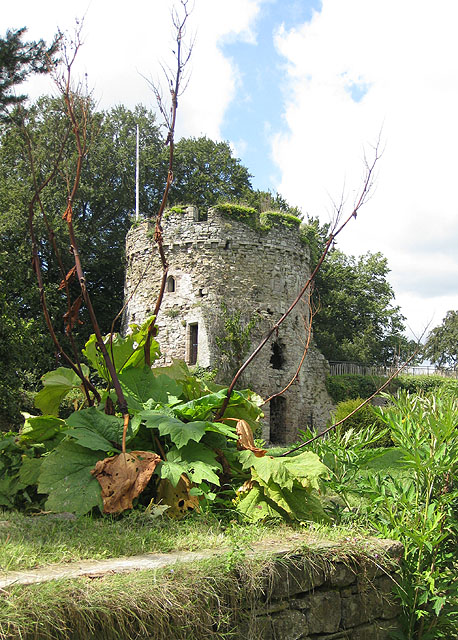
Tower of Usk Castle

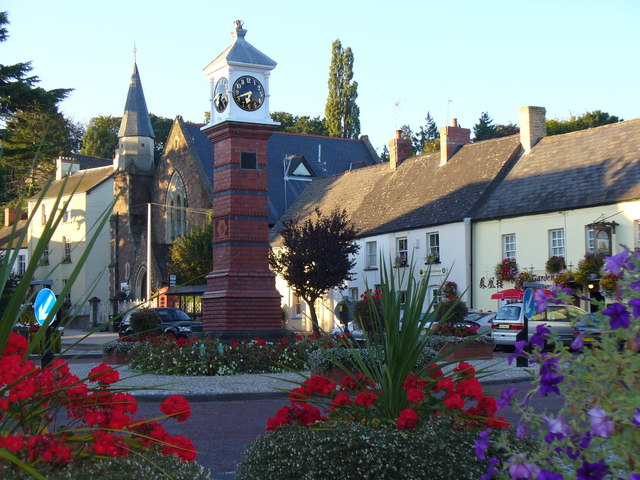
Twyn Square during the Britain in Bloom competition, 2007

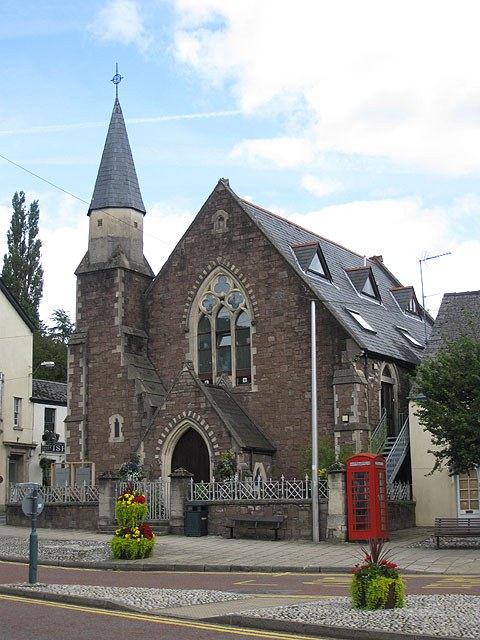
Former Congregational chapel, now used as a commercial art gallery

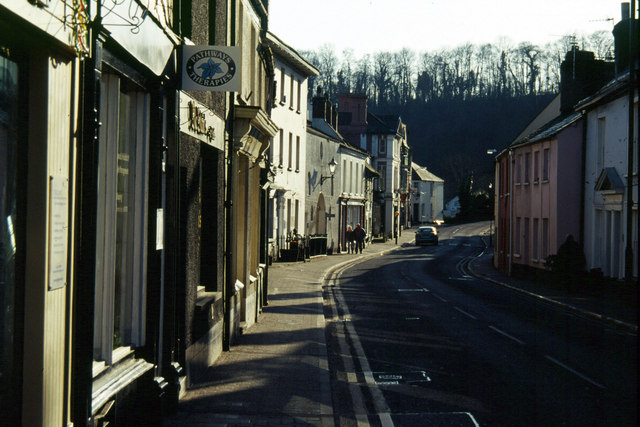
View westwards along Bridge Street

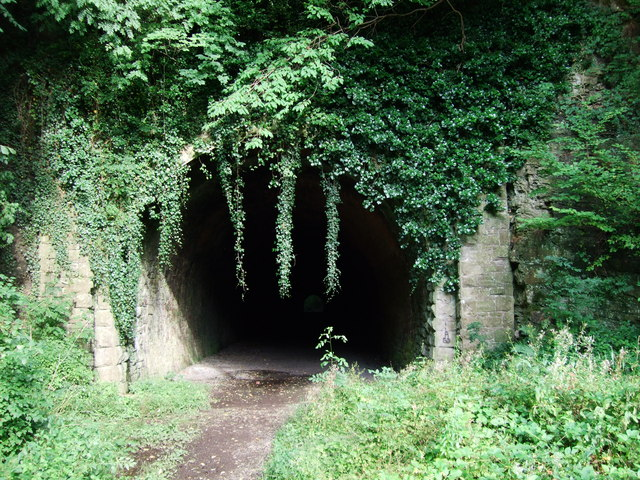
Usk railway tunnel

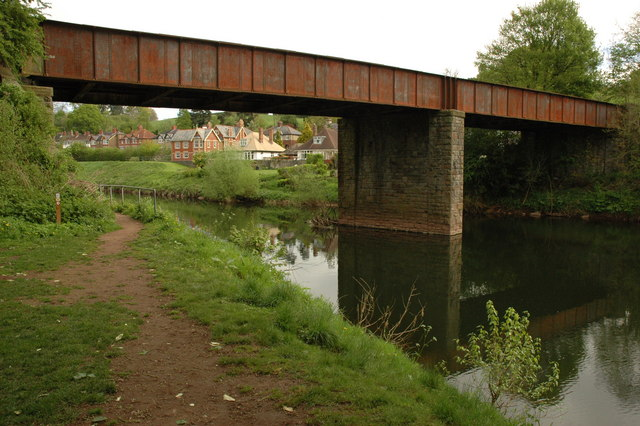
Disused railway bridge

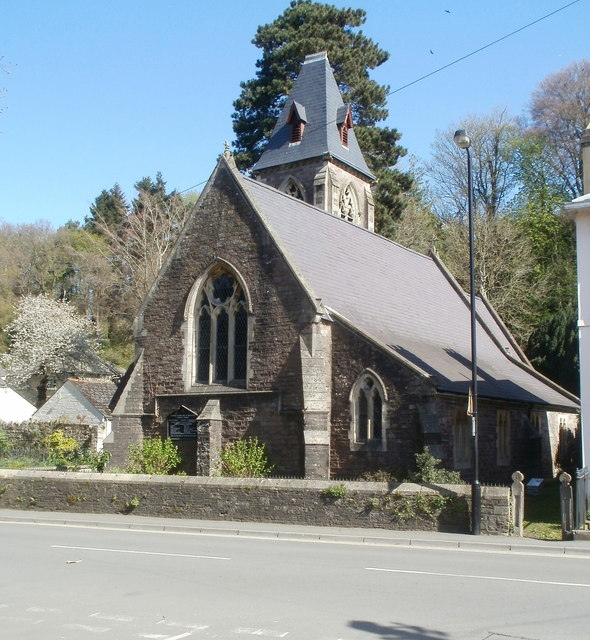
St David Lewis and St Francis Xavier Church

== Twinning ==
Usk was twinned with the German town Graben-Neudorf in Baden-Württemberg in 1980. Over the past few years, there have been numerous visits between the two towns, with the Usk Youth Brass Band making its most recent visits in autumn 2006 and again in 2009. In 2006, the colour scheme of Usk in Bloom was based on those within the crests of both Usk and Graben-Neudorf.

== Freedom of the Town ==
The following people have received the Freedom of the Town of Usk.

- Jean Williams: May 2017

== See also ==
- Usk (hundred)
- Usk (GWR) railway station, including a description of Usk Tunnel

== Sources ==
- Newman, John (2000). Gwent/Monmouthshire. The Buildings of Wales. Penguin / University of Wales Press. pp. 584–. ISBN 0140710531.
