= Newport Docks =

Sea-port in south east Wales

Coordinates: 51°33′33″N 2°58′49″W

Newport Docks is the collective name for a group of docks in the city of Newport, south-east Wales.

By the eighteenth century there were a number of wharves on the west shore of the River Usk; iron and coal were the principal outward traffic. The considerable tidal range and muddy banks made the wharves inconvenient, and as trade grew, the Town Dock was opened in 1842. It was extended to the north in 1858, and trade increased further.

The Alexandra (Newport) Dock Company was established and a large dock of the same name was opened in 1875, followed by the South Dock in 1893, which was greatly extended in 1907 and 1914. Newport Docks were said to have the largest extent of water in any dock in the world.

The Town Dock has been filled in, but the Alexandra Dock system is still in use, although the vast mineral export traffic has long since ended.

== Explosives ==
The current owners' (ABP) future plans for the docks refer to: '4.40 The Port of Newport holds one of the UK's largest explosives licences for a non-Ministry of Defence port. This has traditionally been important for the Port of Newport and will continue to play a part in the cargo mix, albeit not as a regular form of operational activity.'

A navigation guide, 'Ireland and the West Coast of England', published in 2004, refers to 'Explosive Anchorage Areas' and describes them as being 4 miles south-east from the port entrance, and that 48 hours' notice should be given to the port authorities.

In May 2019, the United States Air Force (USAF Europe) moved half a million pounds net weight of explosives from the port to RAF Welford (Berkshire), unloaded from a chartered US ship Ocean Globe at night due to port restrictions and the ship's movements.

== Minerals ==
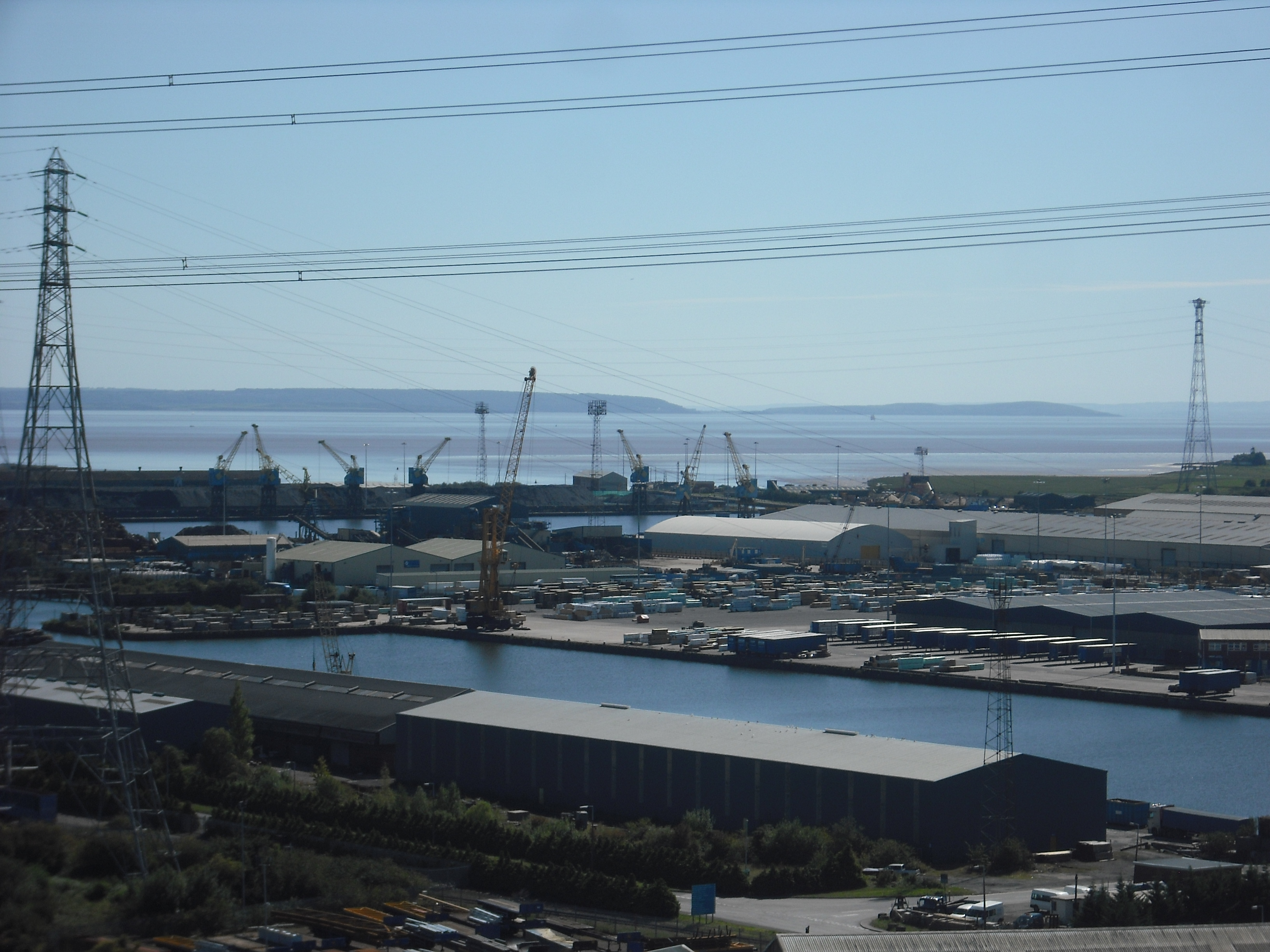
The modern docks from the Transporter Bridge

The area at the head of the Newport Valleys, from Tredegar to Pontypool, was rich in minerals: coal and iron, and limestone. The development of iron smelting processes in the 18th century led to a massive upsurge in industrial output, and the products of the industry needed to be transported to market. The roads and other communication systems in the 18th century were poor, and the minerals were conveyed to a watercourse on the backs of pack animals, at considerable expense. The watercourse closest at hand for the purpose was the River Usk at Newport, and it was to that point that the journey was made. Onward transport by ship from there was relatively easy.

The difficulty and expense of the overland part of the journey resulted in the promotion of the Monmouthshire Canal Navigation. This was authorised by the Monmouthshire Canal Navigation Act 1792 (32 Geo. 3. c. 102) and opened in stages from 1796. It extent was from Pontnewynydd, north-west of Pontypool, to Newport, and from Crumlin to Newport. Both arms of the canal were eleven miles long. The canal did not connect into the Usk at Newport, at Crindau, north of the town, and to a basin near Llanarth Street (close to the present-day Charles Street). The canal company, or the coalowners and ironmasters using the canal, were authorised to make tramroads from any pit within seven or eight miles of the canal, to bring their output to the canalside.

The Monmouthshire Canal Navigation was extremely successful, and it obtained an amending act of Parliament, the Monmouthshire Canal Navigation Act 1802 (42 Geo. 3. c. cxv), allowing it to make additional wharves on the banks of the River Usk to enable cargoes to be transferred to ships for export. The canal was to be extended a mile and a quarter down the river from Llanarth Street, the original termination, to Pillgwenlly; the cost was said to be £100,000. Work was begun in 1806.

== Town Dock ==
The canal and the associated tramroads were extremely successful, and the industries they supported grew rapidly. The Bristol Channel and its tributary watercourses have a large tidal range, and the wharves on the River Usk were subject to this inconvenience. Promoters in the town put forward a scheme to construct a floating dock, and this was authorised by the Newport (Monmouthshire) Dock, Railway and Road Act 1835 (5 & 6 Will. 4. c. lxxv) of July 1835, with capital of £35,000. After considerable delay, and a massive cost increase, the Town Dock opened on 10 October 1842, having cost £195,000 to build. It covered 4 acres.

Newport (Monmouthshire) Docks Act 1854
- Act of Parliament
- Parliament of the United Kingdom
- Long title: An Act to enable the Newport Dock Company to construct a new Dock and other Works; and for other Purposes.
- Citation: 17 & 18 Vict. c. clxxxv

Dates
- Royal assent: 24 July 1854

Text of statute as originally enacted

Trade continued to grow rapidly, and an extension was planned. Authorised under the Newport (Monmouthshire) Docks Act 1854 (17 & 18 Vict. c. clxxxv), it was opened on 2 March 1858; it had cost £64,000 to construct. The original dock became known as the Outer Basin, and the new dock, referred to as the Inner Basin, covered 7 1/2 acres.

Although at first the loading of the ships with general cargoes was dealt with by the ships' crews themselves, in due course, the Town Dock was equipped with a wide variety of hydraulic handling equipment, and a hydraulic generating power station was provided.

By 1914 the Town Dock was equipped with four coal hoists, three of them being capable of lifting loaded coal wagons of 23 tons gross.

The Town Dock, later known as the Old Dock, was superseded by better equipped facilities, and it was closed in October 1930. It was filled in, and at the present day a shopping complex and bus terminal occupies the site.

== The Alexandra Dock ==
The Town Dock was successful, and this success led to a rapid increase in the volume of trade. This required a considerable expansion of the facilities, and it was determined to build new, larger docks at a location nearer the mouth of the Usk. This was authorised by the Alexandra (Newport) Dock Act 1865 (28 & 29 Vict. c. ccclxxvii) and was known as the Alexandra Dock. During the excavation, the remains of a Viking longship were discovered at a depth of twelve feet below the surface.

The dock opened on 10 April 1875. As soon as the opening ceremony was completed, a telegram was despatched to the Prince of Wales, and shortly a reply was received:

"The Prince of Wales, Sandringham, to the Mayor of Newport, Mon. I thank you very much for your telegram, and I congratulate most heartily the inhabitants of Wales on the success of the undertaking."

== Company structure: I ==
Until 1882 there were two dock companies in Newport: the Newport Dock Company, which operated the Town Dock, and the Alexandra (Newport) Dock Company, which operated the Alexandra Dock. By the Alexandra (Newport and South Wales) Docks and Railway Act 1882 (45 & 46 Vict. c. ccli), they were amalgamated to form the Alexandra (Newport and South Wales) Docks and Railway (ANDR). The Newport Dock Company received £150,000 as the purchase price. The Town Dock was now used for smaller vessels, and in time chiefly for the import trade, especially in timber. Larger cargoes were handled at the Alexandra Dock.

== The South Dock ==
Under the Alexandra (Newport and South Wales) Docks and Railway Act 1882 (45 & 46 Vict. c. ccli), the South Dock was authorised. It opened on 6 June 1893, and covered an area of nearly 20 acres; the former Alexandra Dock was renamed the North Dock. Even while the South Dock was being constructed, the tonnage using the North Dock increased by 750,000 tons. There was a South Lock which enabled larger vessels to enter direct from that end, nearer the Bristol Channel. The South Dock opened on 6 June 1893.

It was already obvious that continued growth of business required further accommodation, and work was soon started on the South Dock Extension. This was opened in November 1907, and the Extension was further enlarged by 27 acres, that part opening on 14 July 1914. At the date of opening the new lock entrance for the South Dock Extension was 1,000 feet long and 100 feet in width, the largest lock in the world.

== Railway sidings ==
In the 19th century and the first decades of the 20th, the dominant means of land transport was by rail, and the dominant traffic flow was coal for export or coastal shipping. A huge extent of railway sidings was established at Newport to serve the docks; a considerable volume of loaded wagons were held awaiting the availability of a ship for onward transit. By 1908 there were over 100 miles of railway sidings at Newport Docks. In addition there were transit sheds, generally accommodating commodities that required to be stored under cover.

The method of loading coal for export in the Alexandra Dock system was by hoists, in which loaded railway wagons are lifted from ground level, in order to tip the contents into the ships' holds. General cargoes were loaded and unloaded by hydraulic cranes, which had capacities from 3 to 30 tons.

== Company structure: II ==
Up until 1922 the docks had been owned by the Alexandra (Newport and South Wales) Dock and Railway Company. Under the Railways Act 1921 most of the railway companies of Great Britain were "grouped" into four large units. The Great Western Railway absorbed a number of smaller concerns within its area of influence, and the Newport Docks passed into its ownership, becoming known as the Great Western Railway's Newport Docks.

== Monmouthshire and Brecon Canal ==
The Monmouthshire and Brecon Canal was originally two independent canals – the Monmouthshire Canal from Newport to Pontymoile Basin (including the Crumlin Arm) and the Brecknock and Abergavenny Canal running from Pontymoile to Brecon. Both canals were abandoned in 1962, but the Brecknock and Abergavenny route and a small section of the Monmouthshire route have been reopened since 1970. Much of the rest of the original Monmouthshire Canal is the subject of a restoration plan, which until 2015 included the construction of a new marina at the Newport end of the canal.
