= Alexandra (Newport and South Wales) Docks and Railway =

Former British docks and railway company

The Alexandra (Newport and South Wales) Docks and Railway (ADR) was a company formed in 1882 from the former Newport Dock Company of 1865. There was considerable demand for dock accommodation in Newport, South Wales, chiefly for the export or coastal transport of iron ore and coal. The Newport Dock Company had built an earlier dock that was now outgrown.

Changing demand, particularly for blending coal, created a need to bring coal to Newport from the Taff and Cynon valleys, and the Pontypridd, Caerphilly and Newport Railway was formed to build the line; nominally independent, it shared many directors and major shareholders. It opened in 1884, and was absorbed by the ADR in 1897.

Prior to 1914 the Alexandra Docks were superlative in the world in terms of water area within the docks and ability to handle large vessels. The decline of the mineral extractive industries of South Wales resulted in a corresponding decline of activity by the ADR and its successor owners. However it is now active and successful as a general dock facility as part of Associated British Ports.

== Monmouthshire Railway and Canal ==
The mineral wealth of the area north and north-west of Newport was considerable, but until the latter part of the eighteenth century, available means of transport for the production was extremely limited; there were few roads, and those that did exist were very poor, so that even conveyance on the backs of pack animals was costly and difficult.

This resulted in the promotion of a canal, to connect both Pontnewynydd (north-west of Pontypool) and Crumlin, to a location close to wharves on the River Usk at Newport. This project became the Monmouthshire Canal Navigation, authorised by the Monmouthshire Canal Navigation Act 1792 (32 Geo. 3. c. 102). It was opened in stages from 1796; the authorising act of Parliament permitted the building of tramroad connection from mines and ironworks within seven miles of the canal to connect to the canal itself, and many such connections were made. The Monmouthshire Canal Navigation Company was later authorised to construct wharves on the River Usk at Newport, and in time a large number of riverside wharves, nearly all on the west bank, were made. In fact a plateway was built in 1802 to relieve the canal, which further enhanced the volume of trade.

== Newport Town Dock ==
The tidal range at Newport is large, and the transshipment from canal barges to sea-going ships was laborious, and in time there were calls for a floating dock to eliminate some of the difficulty. In July 1835 the Newport (Monmouthshire) Dock, Railway and Road Act 1835 (5 & 6 Will. 4. c. lxxv) gave authority for the construction of a dock in Newport; it became known as the Town Dock, and it opened in October 1842. During and soon after the construction process, the volume of trade increased very considerably, and the Newport Dock Company Act 1854 (17 & 18 Vict. c. clxxxv) authorised an extension to the Town Dock. From the Town Dock's 4 acres, the total area became 11 1/2 acres, and the extension was opened in 1858.

Still the volume of trade increased, as did the size of vessels in use, and dissatisfaction with the dock accommodation increased.

== Railways ==
At this period it was natural that heavy minerals and all bulky goods from or to locations outside Newport would be conveyed by rail. The South Wales Railway had opened its main line through Newport in 1850, connecting to London and the network of the Great Western Railway (GWR).

In the 1840s the Monmouthshire Canal Company had realised that its plateway track was inefficient and obsolescent, and from 1849 it rebuilt its route using more modern forms of railway. It now styled itself the Monmouthshire Railway and Canal Company.

At the same time the Newport, Abergavenny and Hereford Railway was completing its line, which gave a direct railway connection to the River Mersey in connection with other friendly companies.

The South Wales Railway was a broad gauge line, whereas the rebuilt Monmouthshire lines were narrow (standard) gauge. The Newport Abergavenny and Hereford Railway used the Monmouthshire line to reach Newport, and the London and North Western Railway developed an alliance with the NA&HR, intending to secure access for itself to Newport. (The Great Western Railway, as successor to the South Wales Railway, converted its South Wales routes to narrow (standard) gauge in 1872.)

== Alexandra Dock ==
The unsatisfactory nature of the Town Dock and its extension encouraged the development of plans for an additional dock built on a much larger scale. This scheme became the Alexandra Dock, and the Alexandra (Newport) Dock Company was incorporated by the Alexandra (Newport) Dock Act 1865 (28 & 29 Vict. c. ccclxxvii) of 6 July 1865 to build it. As well as construction of the dock itself, the scheme included a connecting railway line between the dock and the Monmouthshire Railway and Great Western Railway (GWR).

Alexandra Dock was opened on 10 April 1875. During the construction period the volume of traffic handled at Newport continued to increase rapidly, and a second dock was planned, and opened in 1893; the original Alexandra Dock was renamed Alexandra North Dock, and the new dock was the South Dock. It too proved inadequate for the business on offer, and an extension to it was opened, forming a total deep water area of 125 acres. The course of the lower part of the Ebbw River was diverted to make space for the dock.

== Connecting Pontypridd ==
Although the volume of minerals moved through the Newport dock complex was buoyant, it was observed that the best quality steam coal, was being extracted in the Taff and Cynon valleys. This coal was in demand worldwide, chiefly for bunkering and industrial use; moreover blending of coal was becoming important: coal of different qualities was required in the same ship for the purpose.

Cardiff Docks were geographically the usual point of export for the coal from the Taff and its tributaries, but the port had become notorious for congestion and delay, with complaints from ships' masters that they had to stand off for days at a time waiting for a berth to load at Cardiff. If a railway could be built from Pontypridd to Newport, the coalfield there could use Newport Docks as an alternative.

The Brecon and Merthyr Railway had by this time built a line between Caerphilly and Newport, and the gap from Pontypridd to Caerphilly was only 5 miles. The result was a proposal for a line connecting Pontypridd and Newport, through Caerphilly: the Pontypridd, Caerphilly and Newport Railway (PC&NR). It was heavily in the interest of the Alexandra Dock Company for this line to be built, and it gave the new company its full support. It was authorised by Parliament in the Pontypridd, Caerphilly, and Newport Railway Act 1878 (41 & 42 Vict. c. ccxv) on 8 August 1878, (Note: Morgan says that this was a truncated form of the proposal. He implies that the PC&NR wished to build their own line all the way to Newport, but were obliged by Parliament to share the B&M route.) but it did not open until 25 July 1884. There had been an attempted run with a mineral train on 7 July 1884 but it was detained by the GWR on the grounds that the company operating the train did not have the legal right to use the GWR track. (Note: At this time access to the Alexandra Dock system required the transit of a short piece of GWR route.)

There were two distinct sections of the PC&NR: (Note: Here PC&NR means the Pontypridd, Caerphilly and Newport Railway. Nearby, later, was another PC&NR, the Pontypool, Caerleon and Newport Railway.) from Pontypridd to Caerphilly, and from Bassaleg to Mendalgief Junction, south and east of the GWR main line. At Mendalgief Junction the internal track of the Alexandra company started. The gap between Caerphilly and Bassaleg was closed by the Rhymney Railway and the Brecon and Merthyr Railway, over which the PC&NR had running powers.

Although the PC&NR was only a short line it was steeply graded against the loaded traffic, and the transit from Pontypridd involved working over six different railways' networks. In 1891 a separate alignment was opened near Machen to ease the worst of the adverse gradients.

From 28 December 1887 the PC&NR operated a passenger service between Pontypridd and Newport; however it had no locomotives of its own and the Alexandra company provided the engine power.

== Internal dock lines ==
The PC&NR route had the characteristics of an ordinary local railway, and was quite distinct from the internal track at Alexandra Dock. This commenced at East Mendalgief Junction. By 1914 the siding complex covered over 50 acres of ground.

Free stacking space was given for up to 90 days for steel rails and iron ore that had arrived by rail and was awaiting shipping.

== Newport Town Dock ==
Alexandra (Newport and South Wales) Docks and Railway Act 1882
- Act of Parliament
- Parliament of the United Kingdom
- Long title: An Act for empowering the Alexandra (Newport and South Wales) Docks and Railway Company to make a New Dock and other Works in Extension of the Company’s Works in the Borough of Newport in the County of Monmouth and for other purposes.
- Citation: 45 & 46 Vict. c. ccli

Dates
- Royal assent: 18 August 1882

Text of statute as originally enacted

The Alexandra (Newport) Dock Company underwent a capital reconstruction under the Alexandra (Newport and South Wales) Docks and Railway Act 1882 (45 & 46 Vict. c. ccli), changing its name to the Alexandra (Newport and South Wales) Docks and Railway Company; more capital was needed for the continuing dock construction work. In 1883 the company acquired the Town Dock, effective from 1 January 1884. The purchase price was £149,000; this was less than one-third of the money the Newport Dock Company had expended, at nearly £483,000; at the time the (Town) Dock Company was unable to meet interest payments.

== Acquiring the Pontypridd, Caerphilly and Newport Railway ==
Alexandra (Newport and South Wales) Docks and Railway Act 1897
- Act of Parliament
- Parliament of the United Kingdom
- Long title: An Act to provide for the surrender of the lease of the Alexandra (Newport and South Wales) Docks and Railway Company's Undertaking to the Newport (Alexandra) Dock Company Limited and to authorise the transfer to the Company of the Pontypridd Caerphilly and Newport Railway and for other purposes.
- Citation: 60 & 61 Vict. c. clxxxviii

Dates
- Royal assent: 6 August 1897

Text of statute as originally enacted

The ADR was highly profitable due to the huge volumes of minerals passing through its docks. (The financial difficulty referred to above was in capital, the money for new construction.) Friendly relations between it and the PC&NR were maintained, and in 1890 running powers were mutually exchanged and co-operative working consolidated. It only remained to find an auspicious time for amalgamation, and acquisition of the PC&NR by the Alexandra company was authorised by the Alexandra (Newport and South Wales) Docks and Railway Act 1897 (60 & 61 Vict. c. clxxxviii) on 6 August 1897. The PC&NR had 7 1/2 miles of route, whereas prior to the merger, the Alexandra company had 1 3/4 miles of running line; however it had 108 miles of siding.

== Locomotives ==
For all this time, the Alexandra company's network (largely sidings at the docks) and the PC&NR network had been worked by other companies. On 30 April 1906 (Note: Barrie and Baughan, page 108; May 1906 according to Hopwood; on page 10 Morgan quotes 30 April 1903, although he says that the TVR gave notice that in intended to cease working the trains. It is possible that the intention was not given effect for three years.) the Alexandra took over the working of its own mineral traffic, of course on the former PC&NR as well. It had quickly to acquire and hire in the necessary locomotives. Notable among the new fleet were ten condensing tank engines purchased second hand from the Mersey Railway, which was electrifying its system. The condensing apparatus was removed in due course, and they were fitted with cabs in place of the weatherboards.

Hopwood, writing in 1919, said that the company possessed 35 locomotives, all tank engines; there were 19 of the 0-6-0T type, seven 2-6-2T, three 0-6-4T and 3 0-6-2T, an 0-4-2T and two 0-4-0T.

A locomotive passing into GWR ownership at the end of 1922 was originally a double-framed 0-6-0T built for the Metropolitan Railway. It had been sold to the Alexandra in 1880, and was converted to an 0-6-2T in 1921. It was withdrawn by the GWR in 1926.

== Passenger services ==
The PC&NR had wished to operate passenger trains in to Newport High Street, the GWR station, in 1883, but the GWR had refused the facility. Relations had eased somewhat by 1887 and the Alexandra company operated a passenger service between Pontypridd and Newport High Street, over the PC&NR which was still nominally independent. The Great Western Railway itself took over this service from 1 January 1899. From that date the Alexandra company operated no passenger services at Newport, its home location.

In the first decade of the twentieth century, attention was given to ways in which local passenger services might be operated at lower cost in thinly populated areas. The Alexandra company acquired a railmotor, a single coach vehicle with a small integrated locomotive, and it started a service between Caerphilly and Pontypridd, Tram Road Halt. The last named was just short of the junction with the Taff Vale Railway at Pontypridd, so avoiding paying toll charges to that company. Most of the intermediate stopping places were newly installed, of the lightest possible construction, the arrangement being that the railmotor had fixed steps to allow passengers to board and alight at ground level. The service was extended to run from Machen to Tram Road Halt later, and a second railmotor was purchased. Semmens observes that even with the imminent grouping, and thence amalgamation of the Alexandra company with the GWR, the railmotor service "still did not run into the main station at Pontypridd."

== Road passenger services ==
Also in the first decade of the 20th century the Alexandra company operated motor omnibus services within Newport Borough; it had the powers to do so as long as they did not compete with any municipal passenger tram route. Two 14-seat buses were acquired from the London and South Western Railway for the purpose. The arrangement lasted from 1906 to 1933.

== Grouping of the railways ==
Following the Railways Act 1921, most of the railway companies of Great Britain were compulsorily "grouped" into four larger units: the old Great Western Railway and certain large South Wales companies – of which the ADR was one – were "constituents" (in contradistinction to smaller companies that were "subsidiaries") of the larger Great Western Railway. At the grouping, the issued capital of the ADR was £3.66 million, with net income in 1921 of £194,875, and paying a dividend in 1921 of 5% on ordinary stock. It had 9 1/4 miles of running lines (but 100 miles of sidings capable of holding 12,000 wagons), 38 locomotives and four passenger carriages. There were 690 goods wagons, and 1,707 employees.

The merger with the Great Western took effect from 25 March 1922. Hutton asserts that it seems probable that the former PC&NR lines transferred to the Newport District of the GWR.

== Nationalisation and after ==
In 1948 the railways of Great Britain were taken into national ownership under British Railways. The British Transport Commission was a supervisory body intended to oversee all the nationalised transport systems. Under the Transport Act 1962; the British Transport Docks Board (BTDB) was established as a nationally owned body, and the Newport Docks were transferred to it.

The Transport Act 1981 was intended to privatise the BTDB, and in 1982 the docks became part of Associated British Ports, a private sector company with certain statutory powers.

As of 2002 the dock could handle vessels up to 40,000 dwt, and has a combined water area of 125 acres. The only rail access is from the former GWR main line at Alexandra Dock Junction, facing for trains approaching from Newport passenger station.

== Decline of the railways ==
The motor bus service in Newport was mirrored from the 1930s by independent road passenger and goods services in the rural parts of the Alexandra's network as the quality of public roads in rural areas improved. This led to a decline in profitability of the railway's passenger and goods business, although the mineral traffic held up for the time being. After World War II and nationalisation of the railways, the decline accelerated, and the PC&NR passenger service between Pontypridd and Machen was closed from 17 September 1956. A workmen’s service continued between Newport and Caerphilly until 1 July 1963. Glyntaff goods depot, a short distance south of Pontypridd on the PC&NR, continued in use until closure on 29 July 1967.
