= Mamhilad =

Village in Monmouthshire, Wales

Coordinates: 51°43′N 3°00′W

Mamhilad (Welsh: Mamheilad) is a village in the community of Goetre Fawr in Monmouthshire, south east Wales.

== Location ==
Mamhilad is two miles to the north east of Pontypool, Torfaen County Borough.

== History and amenities ==
Mamhilad has a pub called the Star Inn. The Monmouthshire and Brecon Canal passes the village. There is another pub at Croes-y-Pant called, the Horseshoe.

The Church of St Illtyd is notable for having been the parish of the Reverend Christopher Cook (1825–1927), who held the living between 1855 and 1925. He was also Rector of Llanfihangel Pontymoile from 1851, a record 74 years, and served as a curate there even before he was made incumbent. At the time of his death he was described in the local press as the world's oldest clergyman, although this has not been authenticated.

He may have been the longest serving parish priest in Wales, and whilst he retired in 1916 he continued to serve for another nine years until declared incapacitated by the Provincial Court of the Church in Wales.

Mamhilad is close to business parks straddling the A4042 on the former ICI Fibres and British Nylon Spinners site.
