= Crumlin Arm (Monmouthshire canal) =

Coordinates: 51°40′47″N 3°08′12″W

The Crumlin Arm of the Monmouthshire canal is part of the Monmouthshire & Brecon Canal network in South Wales. It connected Crumlin and its tramways to the Docks at Newport.

== History ==
The Crumlin to Abercarn section opened in March 1794 and two years later the branch was open except for Fourteen Locks. It was not until April 1799 that the proprietors (shareholders) declared that the canal was finally complete.

The branch was 11 miles (18 km) long, rising 358 ft (109 m) through 32 locks.

The branch was closed by the British Transport Commission Act 1949 (12, 13 & 14 Geo. 6. c. xxix).

== Route ==
The canal started at a basin in Crumlin and ran through the villages of Newbridge, Abercarn and Cwmcarn now under the A467. The canal then reached Cwmcarn lock now under the grass at the end of the present canal. The canal crosses the Pontywaun aqueduct and follow the side of the mountain above Crosskeys and Risca this section is the longest lock-free pound on the system until the Fourteen Locks. The canal descends the fourteen locks and turns sharp along the hill side. The canal now flows next to the M4 into urban Newport to Barrack Hill tunnel (now disused and culverted). The rest of the canal through the city is lost beneath modern roads and buildings. The Kingsway dual carriageway follows the route of the canal to the now-filled-in Old Town Docks near the Transporter Bridge.

== Locks ==
Location	Number of locks
Allt-yr-yn	5
Cefn	1
Fourteen Locks	14
Cwmcarn	1
Abercarn	7
Newbridge area	4

These were originally numbered (as were bridges) by the usual system of top down. Therefore, Cwmcarn lock was number 12. The GWR renumbered the locks (and bridges) from Newport to Crumlin and then up the Main Line to Brecon. Thus, Cwmcarn lock became Lock 22. Lock 22 was under the grass area just beyond the end of the canal. Going down was a lock-free pound to the top of Fourteen Locks and going up was another pound to Abercarn bottom lock below the old Prince of Wales Colliery.

== Traffic ==
The vast majority of the tonnage was coal or iron (particularly coal). Bricks from Allt-yr-yn Brickworks were later important but in relatively small tonnages. There was a regular general cargo boat twice a week from Newport to Crumlin until 1915 but whilst it was important for traders, the tonnages were small. The Branch was often short of water and by 1829 a tramroad was available from Beaufort to Newport as well as from the big collieries at Abercarn. This meant that the canal above Abercarn became less used.

Boats were approximately 64 ft 9 in (19.74 m) long by 9 ft 2 in (2.79 m) wide.

== Canal today ==
Today the canal is mostly disused and the northern end is lost beneath the A467 bypass. There are eight miles of canal, but blocked by roads. The National cycle route 47 follows the towpath for seven miles (11 km) from Barrack Hill tunnel, Newport to Green Meadow Bridge, Crosskeys. 1.5 miles (2.4 km) of canal between Pontywaun Aqueduct (Pontywaun) and Darren Bridge (Risca) is still navigable but only by small craft via a slipway at Pontywaun.

== Plans ==
There are plans to reopen the canal down to the Fourteen Locks then on to central Newport. This requires building two aqueducts, raising a number of roads and rebuilding 20 locks. There are plans to build a marina at the Darran quarry in Risca with a transport museum. Other plans include a new marina at Newport and a connection to the River Usk to connect to the main system of canals in the UK.

== See also ==
- Monmouthshire & Brecon Canal
- Canals of Great Britain
- History of the British canal system
