= Landmaster (disambiguation) =

The Landmaster is a unique military vehicle featured in the 1977 film Damnation Alley.

Landmaster may also refer to:

- Landmaster (Star Fox), a fictional tank from the Star Fox series of video games
- Landmaster 9.12, a Leyland Trucks model from the early 1980s
- Land Master, a late 1970s British 4×4 truck
- Landmaster (cultivator), a brand of wheeled, small engine powered rotary tiller machine
- Hindustan Landmaster, a modified 4 cylinder Indian Version of 6 cylinder Morris Oxford Series II
