= Goetre Fawr =

Community in Monmouthshire, Wales

- Community
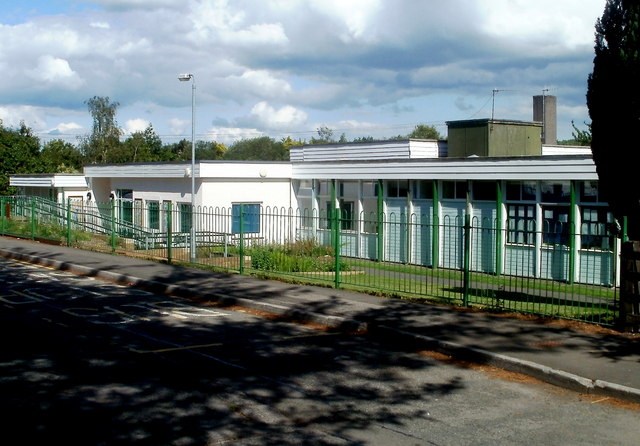
- Goytre Fawr Primary School, Penperlleni

- Location within Monmouthshire
- Principal area: Monmouthshire
- Country: Wales
- Sovereign state: United Kingdom
- Police: Gwent
- Fire: South Wales
- Ambulance: Welsh
- List of places UK Wales Monmouthshire 51.74178°N 2.9927°W Map of the community

Goetre Fawr is a community and electoral ward in Monmouthshire, a few miles south of the town of Abergavenny in South East Wales.

According to the 2011 UK Census the population of the community and ward was 2,393.

== Community ==
The community includes the villages or settlements of Goytre, Penperlleni, Little Mill, Mamhilad, Nant-y-derry and Pencroesoped. The A4042 road from Abergavenny to Cwmbran runs through the middle of the community, as does the Monmouthshire and Brecon Canal and the mainline railway. Part of the eastern border is formed by the River Usk.

== Governance ==
Goetre Fawr elects or co-opts up to twelve community councillors to Goetre Fawr Community Council. The Goetre Fawr electoral ward elects one county councillor to Monmouthshire County Council.
