= St Dennis, Cornwall =

Village in Cornwall, England

Coordinates: 50.383°N 4.883°W

St Dennis: Cornish: Tredhinas
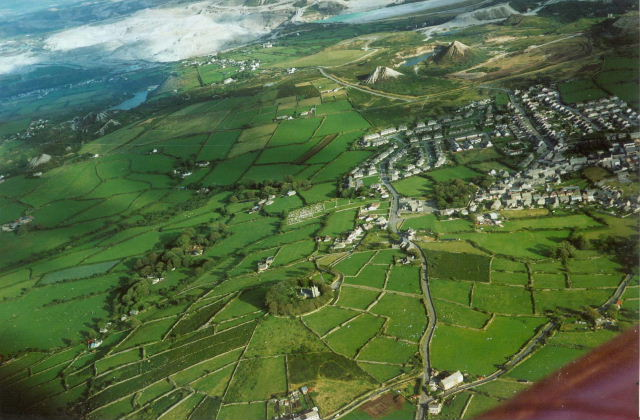
- St Dennis from the air showing the church built inside a hillfort

- Location within Cornwall
- Population: 2,785 (United Kingdom Census 2011)
- Unitary authority: Cornwall
- Ceremonial county: Cornwall
- Region: South West
- Country: England
- Sovereign state: United Kingdom
- Post town: ST AUSTELL
- Postcode district: PL26
- Dialling code: 01726
- Police: Devon and Cornwall
- Fire: Cornwall
- Ambulance: South Western
- UK Parliament: St Austell and Newquay

St Dennis (Cornish: Tredhinas, meaning hillfort farmstead) is a civil parish and village in Cornwall, England, United Kingdom. The village is situated on the B3279 between Newquay and St Austell.

St Dennis had a population of 2,696 in the 2001 census, increasing to 2,810 at the 2011 census. An electoral ward also exists with a population at the same census of 4,560. A quarter of the male population is employed in the extraction of china clay.

The village is famous for its church built on the site of an Iron Age hillfort. Other major buildings include the Methodist chapel and the Boscawen Hotel.

== History ==
St Dennis originated as several smaller settlements: Hendra, Trelavour and Whitepit. The area's population grew rapidly after William Cookworthy discovered China Clay in the area.

== Geography ==
The area is characterised by tips and pits of china clay mining but St Dennis village itself is designated an 'island settlement' which prevents encroachment by the china clay industry. Much of the parish is up to 500 feet above sea level, and the countryside is moorland with small fields enclosed by earth-covered granite walls known as 'hedges'. These hedges were constructed centuries ago, when the land was cleared for farming. Part of Trelavour Downs has been designated a Site of Special Scientific Interest and a Geological Conservation Review site. A small shallow pit of 0.3 ha was once worked for lithium and is the best known locality for biotite mica in Britain.

== Churches and chapels ==
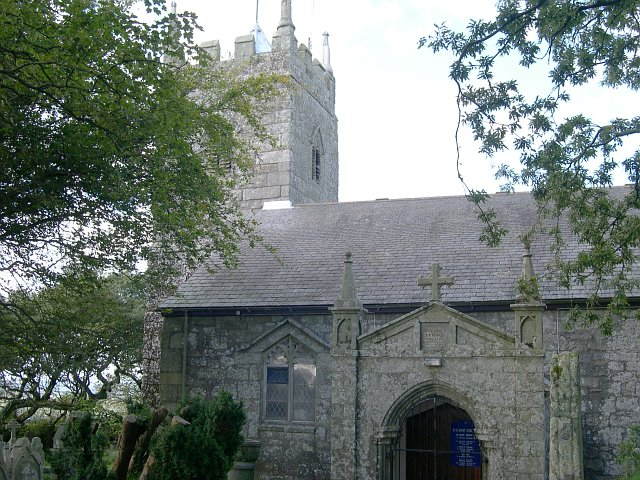
St Dennis Parish Church

The church is situated on top of a hill overlooking the village and has views over Goss Moor to the sea at Newquay. It is dedicated to St Denys and stands on the site of an Iron Age fort. The tower is the oldest part of the church, and the newer church was almost destroyed by fire in 1985. Although heartbreaking at the time, it has risen again from the ashes. The new roof timbers were so large that they had to be lifted in by a Royal Navy Sea King helicopter.

The churchyard features in a scene of the television detective series 'Wycliffe' - Series 4 Episode 8 - 'Old Crimes New Times'.

The village also has a strong history of Methodism and at one stage there were three Methodist chapels in the village. Of these three, Carne Hill is the only chapel which is still open to this day.

The churchyard cross has a head of horseshoe shape and is ornamented with some unusual incised ornament.

== Education and social life ==
The infant school in St Dennis has been amalgamated with the new primary school, and the old building has been refurbished and is now used as an outreach centre called ClayTAWC. The centre teaches computer studies to adults in the area, and also has many other interesting classes.

St Dennis Band is based in the village, and has a history of competing with some of the world's top bands. The Band recently gained Championship Status in 2017. Last year the band went to Blackpool, retaining their Championship status for another year. Currently they are the WEBF Champions.

The village of St Dennis has two public houses, The Commercial Inn and the Boscawen Hotel, and there are also three clubs, the St Dennis Working Men's Club, the St Dennis Band Club, and St Dennis A.F.C.

== Technology ==
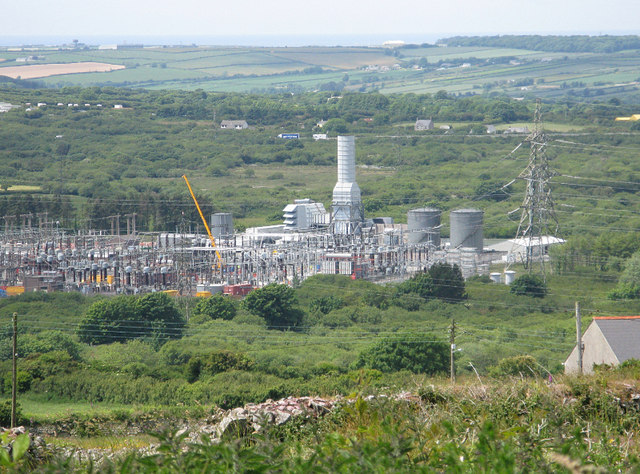
The Goss Moor electricity sub-station

The Land Master all-terrain vehicle was developed here in the late 1970s.

The Cornwall Energy Recovery Centre A is an incinerator built near St Dennis by French company SITA. The first planning application was submitted in 2008. The initial planning application was rejected in 2009 following opposition by the Parish Council over worried about the effects of pollution and extra traffic. Following a Public Inquiry 2011 permission was granted and construction began in 2012. A later High Court challenge from the Cornwall Waste Forum delayed construction and the case went to the Court of Appeal at the Royal Courts of Justice which unanimously rejected the Cornwall Waste Forum's claim in March 2012. A further challenge at the Supreme Court also failed. Work restarted in August 2012 which was carried out by CORMAC, a company wholly owned by Cornwall Council. SITA claim that the Cornwall Energy Recovery Centre (CERC) will benefit Cornwall by diverting 90 per cent of the county’s residual waste away from landfill and will generate sixteen megawatts of electricity. The local community has received hundreds of thousands of pounds in compensation.

== Railway lines ==
The railway station for St Dennis is St Columb Road (over 3 miles away), but there have been mineral railways in the parish, for which see article St Dennis railway station.

== Cornish wrestling ==
The traditional location for Cornish wrestling tournaments was the small field behind the Commercial Inn, currently being used as a dumping ground. Other places used for Cornish wrestling tournaments include:

- A field behind the Miners Arms, which was a public house in Hendra.
- Old football ground opposite the current location of the Football club.

Given how small St Dennis has been, surprisingly many famous Cornish wrestlers came from St Dennis. Successful examples who fought in Cornish wrestling tournaments include: Gilbert Bennetts (heavyweight champion 1921 and lightweight champion in 1922 and 1923), George Bazeley (who beat Yukio Tani and whose grandson (Richard Bazley) is looking to make a film about his fight with Tani called "George and the Dragon") and Almond Giles (who became lightweight champion of America, South Africa and England). More recently Toby Garner (featherweight champion 2016 and 2017 and lightweight champion 2017), Violet Margetts (ladies champion 2023) and Simon Margetts (heavyweight champion 2019-2023 and light heavyweight champion 2019-2023).
