= Church of St Illtyd, Mamhilad =

Coordinates: 51.7252°N 3.0071°W

- Church of St Illtyd
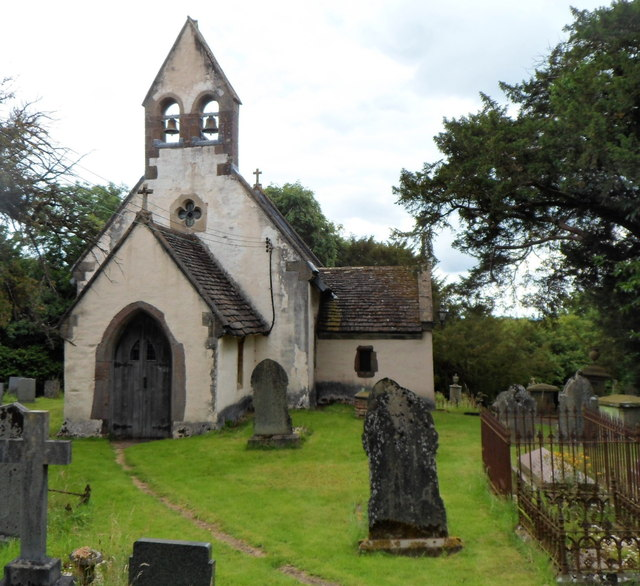
- "an extremely fine and rare rood-loft "

- Location in Monmouthshire
- Location: Mamhilad, Monmouthshire
- Country: Wales
- Denomination: Church in Wales

History
- Status: parish church
- Founded: late Medieval

Architecture
- Functional status: Active
- Heritage designation: Grade II*
- Designated: 18 November 1980
- Architectural type: Church
- Style: Perpendicular

Administration
- Diocese: Monmouth
- Archdeaconry: Monmouth
- Deanery: Heart of Monmouthshire
- Parish: Heart of Monmouthshire

Clergy
- Rector: Rev'd Canon Sally Ingle-Gillis

The Church of St Illtyd, Mamhilad, Monmouthshire, Wales, is a parish church with its origins in the 11th century. Renovations took place in the 19th century and again in 1999–2000. It is a Grade II* listed building and an active parish church.

== History ==
The church dates from the medieval period but the building fabric cannot be dated with certainty. Mention of the church is made in a record of 1100. The existing features are late medieval, or of the restoration undertaken by John Prichard and John Pollard Seddon in 1864–1865. A further restoration took place in 1999–2000. The church remains an active church in the parish of Mamhilad with Monkswood with Glascoed.

== Architecture and description ==
The church is built of Old Red Sandstone rubble. The style of the existing fabric is Perpendicular. The church comprises a nave, chancel, two porches and a bellcote. Cadw describes the rood loft as a "great rarity" and the listing record for the church's Grade II* designation notes the "extremely fine and rare rood-loft".
