= Pontymoile Basin =

Coordinates: 51°41′45″N 3°01′33″W

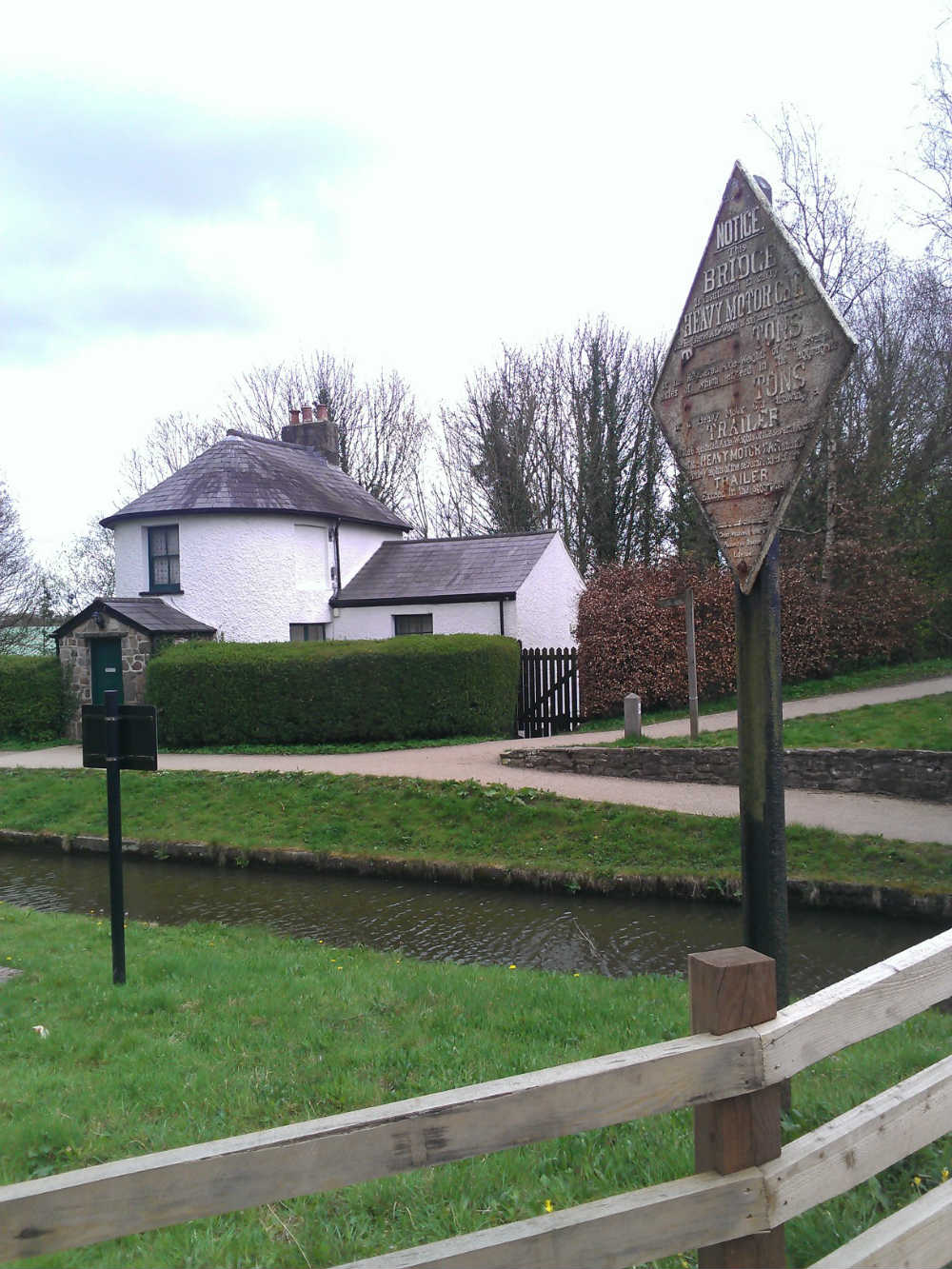
Junction Cottage and Toll Sign at Pontymoile Basin

Pontymoile Basin (Welsh: Basn Pont-y-moel) is a mooring point and canal junction on the Monmouthshire & Brecon Canal.

== Location ==
The basin lies on the Pontypool stretch of the Monmouthshire & Brecon Canal in the Pontypool suburb of Pontymoile in the county borough of Torfaen and historic county of Monmouthshire in south Wales.

== History ==
Originally a toll point, the canal narrows significantly as it approaches the basin. Junction Cottage is the old toll house, built in 1810–1812 and is Grade II listed. The basin itself is a large expanse of water adjacent to the canal. It is used for turning narrowboats and filling up with water.

Pontymoile Basin was the site of the junction with the three-mile Monmouthshire Canal to Pontnewynydd, containing 11 locks. This spur was fed from tramways carrying coal and iron down the valley. The junction was enacted in 1797 and completed in 1812. The spur was problematic due to water supply issues, and it was overtaken by rail when the Monmouthshire Railway and Canal Company drained it and reused the bed for their railway line in 1854, though it had seen decline prior to that date. Today traces of both canal and railway have disappeared under the reshaped A472 road.

== Visitor attraction ==
The basin is becoming something of a visitor attraction. Narrowboats and cruisers can be seen along the private stretch of moorings and day boat hire was introduced in 2007. Boats can be hired for full days or half days. There is a unique narrow boat café which was itself a former canal boat.

The basin is located near Pontypool Park and is a stopping point for boats en route to Goetre Wharf.

== See also ==
- Canals of the United Kingdom
- History of the British canal system
