= Penperlleni =

Hamlet in Monmouthshire, Wales

Coordinates: 51°44′11″N 2°58′57″W

Amenities in Penperlleni

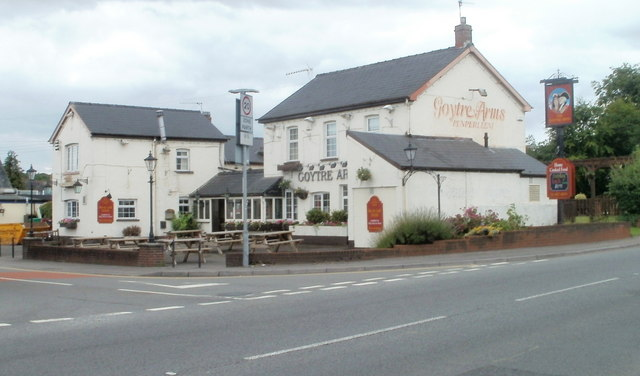
The Goytre Arms in Penperlleni

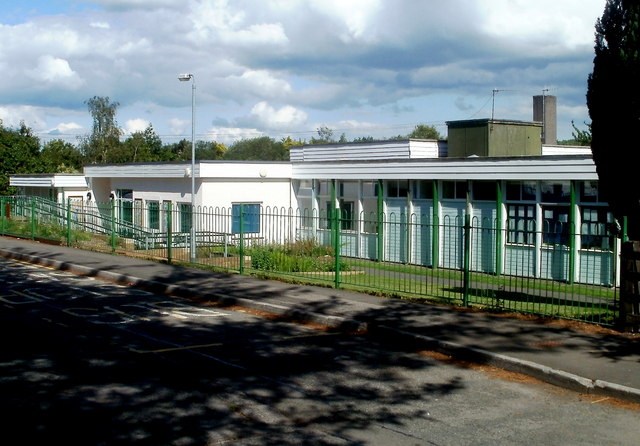
Goytre Fawr Primary School

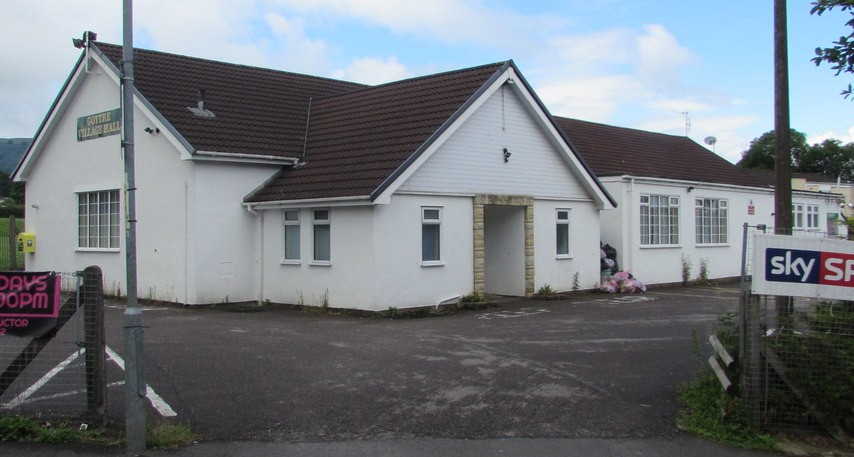
Goytre Village Hall & Social Club

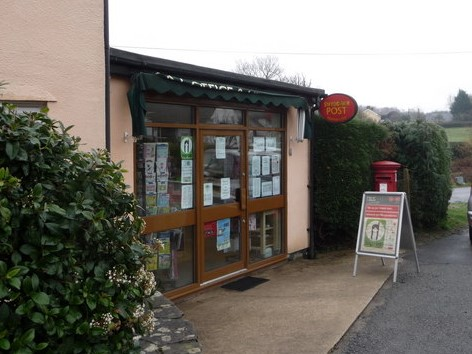
Penperlleni Post Office

Penperlleni is a hamlet within the community and electoral ward of Goetre Fawr in Monmouthshire, Wales.

== Etymology ==
The name of Penperlleni derives from two Welsh words: pen refers to the summit or top of a hill, while the second element, perlleni, has been interpreted as meaning a "round mass" and an "area of round hills", although the current Welsh word for orchard (perllan) may apply.

== History and amenities ==
Penperlleni was previously known as Pelleny (1256), Pethllenny (1330), Pelleny (1349) and Pellenig (1593). Penperlleni has a number of amenities, including a primary school, Goytre Fawr Primary School; a church, Capel Ed; a public house, the Goytre Arms; a village hall; and a post office.

Penperlleni lies on the Newport–Shrewsbury trunk road (A4042 road).
