= British Nylon Spinners =

Former British textile company

- Industry: Manufacturing
- Founded: 1940; 86 years ago
- Headquarters: United Kingdom
- Area served: Australia; New Zealand; South Africa; Germany; United States; Canada
- Products: Nylon

British Nylon Spinners (BNS) was a British company set up in 1940 by ICI and Courtaulds to produce nylon yarn. In 1964 it was taken over by ICI after ICI had tried and failed to take over Courtaulds.

== Beginning ==
In 1939, ICI took out a licence to manufacture nylon fibre. Realizing that they needed the experience of a specialised textile firm, ICI formed a partnership with Courtaulds, who were leading suppliers of viscose rayon. In January 1940 they registered British Nylon Spinners as a limited company with a nominal capital of £300,000 and took equal shares in the company. The product was badly needed to make parachutes, especially after Japan's entry into the war in December 1941 blocked supplies of silk. Given the timing, it may well be that the Government 'persuaded' the two companies to do this. A country which is at war or contemplating war is likely to take control of all major investments.

In March 1940 Courtaulds announced that they were building a plant which would go into production in the autumn. This was at Lockhurst Lane, Coventry. Production began on 23 January 1941. At this stage nylon polymer and spinner units were being supplied from the U.S. by DuPont. The site was bombed on 14 November 1940 and 8 April 1941. The second attack stopped production for several weeks.

It was agreed with the Ministry of Supply that they should find a safer site. Banbury was considered but the final choice was Stowmarket, Suffolk, where ICI Paints Division was already established. Two-thirds of production would be here and one third at Coventry. Limited production began at Stowmarket in December 1942 and full production in June 1943. Both Coventry and Stowmarket closed in 1948.

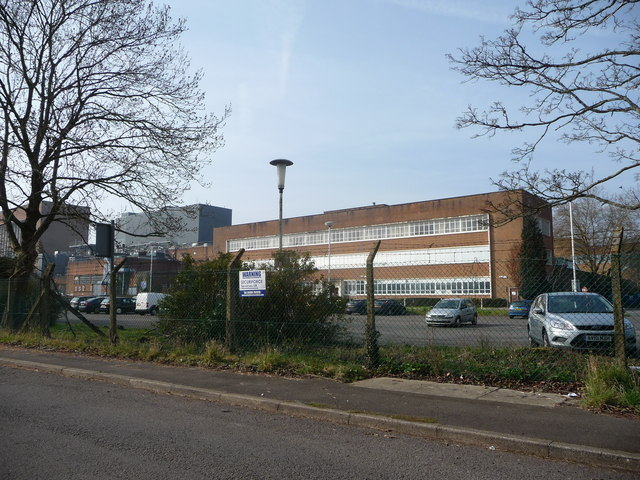
The Mamhilad factory and offices, now known as Mamhilad Park Estate

In March 1945 it was announced that they had purchased a site in South Wales. This was at Mamhilad, Pontypool. In November 1945, it was announced that F. C. Bagnall had been appointed managing director of the company, which was based in Coventry.

In May 1947 ICI announced that they were building a new plant in Billingham to make nylon polymer. This would have a capacity of 10,000 lb. per year. Some of this polymer would go to Plastics Division but most would go to BNS. During the war polymer had been made in Huddersfield and used to make parachutes, rope and other materials.

In July 1948 Courtaulds announced that the Pontypool factory was near completion but there were delays owing to shortage of construction materials.

The first yarn was spun at Pontypool on 20 April 1948. However, there were quality problems so initially only one machine was in experimental use. The first problem was with discoloured polymer; then there was a wide variety of yarn production issues. These took months of combined effort to solve. By September 1948 they were ready to run three machines. In July 1949 Courtaulds announced that production had begun at Pontypool in the previous April. They expected full production to be reached by the end of the year. Most production would have to be exported under government direction. However it wasn't until May 1950 that all production was passed from development personnel to production personnel.

When completed, the Pontypool site had a production plant, a pilot plant, a building devoted to testing and developing the products to support their successful use by customers (Technical Development Department), an administration block and a research and development block. Most of the buildings were still present in 2011. They can be found at the junction, near Little Mill, between the A4042 and the minor road to Mamhilad.

In February 1949 the CIC granted permission to increase the capital from £6 million to £8 million.

== Operation and growth ==
In 1950 BNS reduced their prices by more than 20% owing to increased production volume and improving methods. Also Courtaulds said BNS was close to full production and planning to increase capacity. This would mean retaining profits within BNS but Courtaulds and ICI hoped that they would soon receive some reward for their investment. The outlook was good. One year later they said BNS had made substantial progress and work had begun on expansion. In 1952 progress was continuing.

In 1952 BNS had to go to court to defend its right to produce its product. Du Pont had granted nylon thread patents to ICI in December 1946. In turn ICI had granted exclusive rights to BNS the following March. However the US Attorney General had begun a long term action in the US under the Sherman Act in 1944. On 30 July 1952 the judge made an order requiring ICI to reassign the patents to Du Pont within 90 days. This would have ruined BNS so they applied to the British court to obtain an injunction to restrain ICI from complying with the US court's order. The judge decided that it would be quite wrong for a foreign court to impose an order on a British company forcing them to break a contract which had been entered upon properly and fairly in the course of commercial operations. This decision was appealed and the appeal court confirmed it, noting that the US judge had expressed some doubt as to the likelihood of his decision being accepted in the UK.

In 1953 the company provided nylon to John Southworth and Sons of Manchester to make special clothing for the Everest expedition. The company announced that they had acquired a factory formerly used by British Bemberg Ltd in Doncaster. The factory was being adapted for the production of nylon yarn. In 1955 they made a start with about 350 people eventually expanding to 1500.

In 1954 the managing director Bagnall announced that the prices of all fine denier nylon yarn would be reduced by 15% and staple by 10%. This would make it the cheapest in the world.

In 1955 a purpose-built clubhouse was built at Pontypool. It was opened on 5 November by Lord Raglan, the Lord Lieutenant. It had a fine hall used for dancing and concerts. Over the years many famous performers gave concerts there. In 1959/60 a clubhouse was built at Doncaster. It was opened on 10 October 1960 by the Earl of Scarborough. In May 1963 a clubhouse was opened at Gloucester.

In 1957 The Times published a Textile Glossary, which included nylon. There were now some 40 different types of nylon stockings on the market including yarn as fine as 9 denier, five times finer than human hair.

Also in 1957 the Melbourne correspondent of The Times reported that BNS had decided to manufacture the first nylon yarn in Australia.

In September of the same year, plans for big extensions were announced for Doncaster Works. 900 people were working there. This would increase by 400–500 men and 50–100 women. The cost was estimated at £3-£4 M. Completion was due by the end of 1958. Eventually there would be 1800 people of whom 90% would be men. There would be a three shift system. Besides production, team of experts would be employed to improve the company's expertise with nylon staple.

In December BNS announced that they had developed an elasticised yarn. Manufacturers of stockings could now produce ranges with only three size fittings.

In 1958 the Navy announced that its new aircraft direction frigate HMS Llandaff was to be equipped with nylon and Terylene ropes instead of the traditional wire ropes. It was said that commercial shipping had been doing so for some time. Compared with wire they gave much more strength relative to weight, retained flexibility in the cold, withstood sudden shocks, and retained strength in the wet.

Also in 1958 BNS applied to the Board of Trade to build a nylon factory at Leigh Park, Havant, Portsmouth. It was to cost £10M, employ 2000 people, and cover 100 acres. The local authorities supported the application. The application was rejected on the grounds that other parts of the country were in more need. There were protests but they were unavailing.

The Secretary of State for Scotland met a deputation from Greenock Town Council to discuss unemployment there. He said he hoped that BNS could be persuaded to make their new investment in Scotland and that a great deal of work had been done on a £6M proposal for a new dry dock in Greenock.

There had also been a delay in the delivery of new nylon-twisting machines at Doncaster Works. Skilled operatives were being employed on unskilled work to avoid losing them.

In 1962, BNS took over a site near the old Gloster Aircraft Company site near Gloucester, employing people made redundant by the closure of the famous aircraft company. They expected to employ about 2,500 people.

BNS had a weekly paper Signpost and a monthly BNS Magazine for internal consumption. Signpost was renamed Fibres Post in 1965.

BNS had subsidiaries abroad in: Australia, New Zealand, South Africa, (Germany), United States (in partnership with ICI and Celanese) and Canada. Some of these manufactured yarn, others were purely sales operations.

== ICI takeover ==
In 1962 ICI made a takeover bid for Courtaulds. Courtaulds resisted it vigorously and won the battle. However, talks between the two companies continued and in April 1964 they made recommendations to their shareholders. ICI would surrender its 37.5 per cent holding in Courtaulds and pay Courtaulds two million pounds a year for five years, "to take account of the future development expenditure of Courtaulds in the nylon field". In return Courtaulds were to transfer to ICI their 50 per cent holding in BNS. BNS was absorbed into ICI's existing fibres operation, ICI Fibres, which was based on polyester.
