= Land Master =

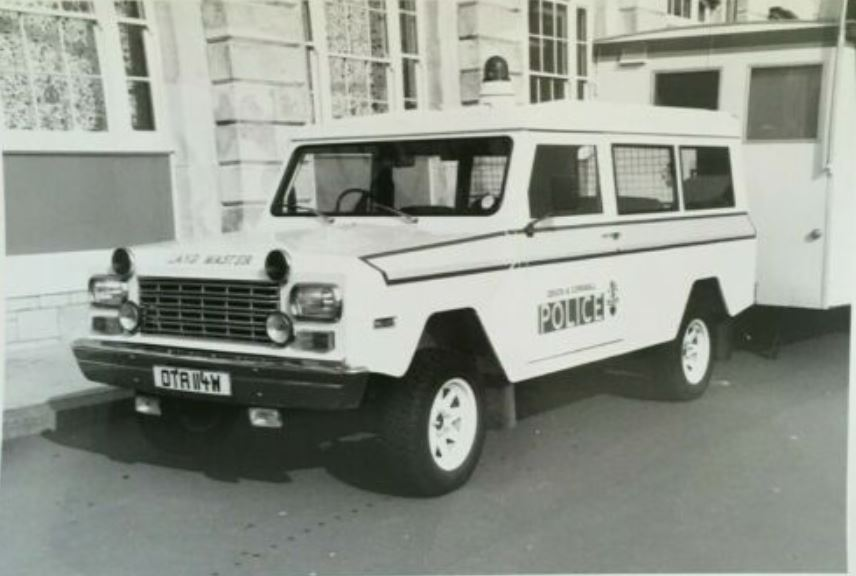
Land Master, registration OTA114W, operated by Devon & Cornwall Police, registered in April 1981.

The Land Master is a civilian all-terrain utility vehicle produced in the late 1970s and early 1980s as a competitor to the Land Rover. It incorporated design features that were not then available on the contemporary Series 3 and were only introduced some years later on the Land Rover Defender.

It was tested by the British Army, including in forward control form, and one was used by the Devon and Cornwall Constabulary. The Devon and Cornwall Constabulary vehicle bore the registration OTA114W, and is pictured here. This is the registration displayed on the Land Master survivor image to the right. Money was promised by the Ministry of Defence but the deal fell through. Eventually, the rights to the Land Master were sold to a company called C.K. Farnworth of Crumlin, Caerphilly, Wales. The company had industrial premises and several vehicles were produced in Oakdale in South Wales.

The prototype vehicles were made at Trelavour Road Garage, St Dennis, Cornwall, designed by the garage's owner (Stanley Metherell), and were based on Dodge pickup truck parts. The chassis was made of tubular steel so that when it went over bumps and steep angles, dirt on top of the chassis rails would fall off, unlike Land Rovers of the time. All body panels were made of aluminium.

Surviving vehicles are very rare, one Land Master (possibly the only one actually sold to a customer) is rumoured still to be on the road in Kent, England,(this vehicle which was the third one built, is still in existence although not on the road) and another is kept by the original builders at St. Dennis. A very tatty survivor was spotted near Hexham in Northumberland in the early 1990s and two images of survivors can be found on the web - though it is currently unclear which company made them or at what date.

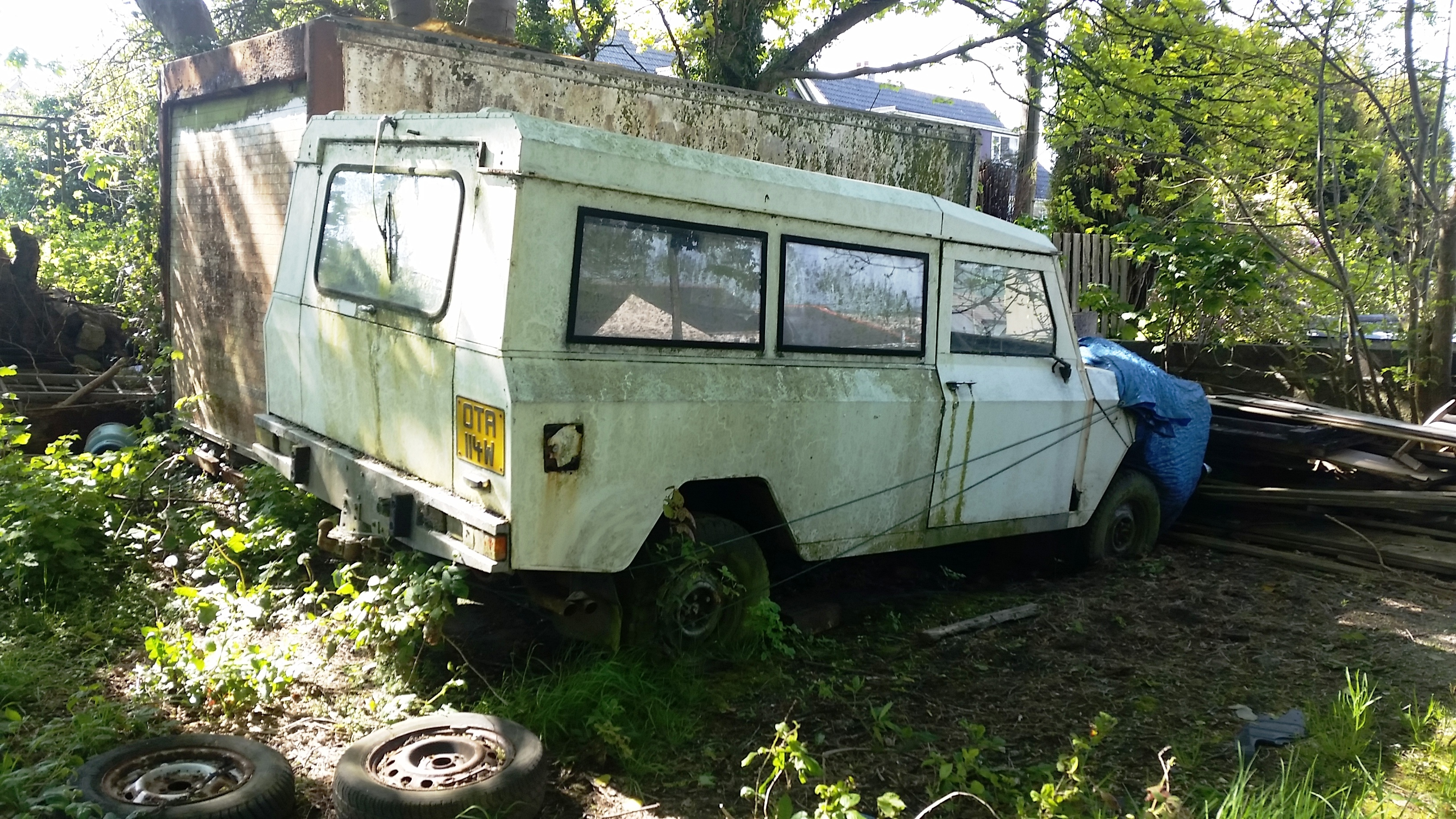
Land Master survivor. This vehicle is the ex-Devon and Cornwall Police car pictured above.

Engines available included a 3.8 L Perkins diesel I4 rated at 82 bhp (61 kW; 83 PS), a 4.0 L Perkins diesel V6 rated at 101 bhp (75 kW; 102 PS), or a 5.9 L Chrysler petrol V8 rated at 170 bhp (127 kW; 172 PS). It is rumoured that the vehicle in Kent may have been retrofitted with a VM diesel.

A successor business to those originals mentioned above introduced a version of the vehicle that they called Powr4. This seems to have been a very short lived iteration.

A video, filmed in 1978 for ITV's "News At Ten" and narrated by Ray Moloney, exists of a Land Master prototype being driven by Mr Metherell;
