= Crumlin, Caerphilly =

Crumlin: Welsh: Crymlyn
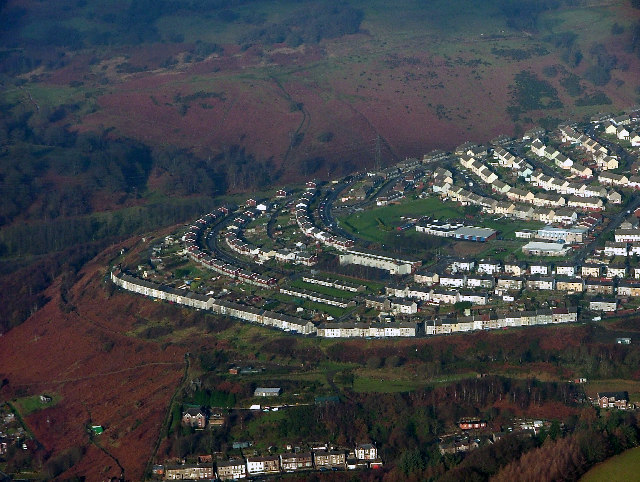
- Site of Crumlin Viaduct

- Location within Caerphilly
- Population: 5,947 (2011)
- OS grid reference: ST215985
- Principal area: Caerphilly
- Preserved county: Gwent
- Country: Wales
- Sovereign state: United Kingdom
- Post town: NEWPORT
- Postcode district: NP11
- Post town: ABERTILLERY
- Postcode district: NP13
- Dialling code: 01495
- Police: Gwent
- Fire: South Wales
- Ambulance: Welsh
- UK Parliament: Newport West and Islwyn
- Senedd Cymru – Welsh Parliament: Casnewydd Islwyn
- List of places UK Wales Caerphilly 51.6798°N 3.1368°W Map of the community

Crumlin (Welsh: Crymlyn) is a town, community and electoral ward in Caerphilly county borough in South Wales. It is situated in the Ebbw River valley, 5 miles (8 km) west of Pontypool, within the historic boundaries of Monmouthshire.

== History ==
The name is said to be derived from cromlech, a type of megalithic construction.

Kelly's Directory of South Wales (1895) noted that Crumlin was "a secluded village, scarcely known to any beyond the few persons resident there". It considered Crumlin one of the most picturesque spots in the county, surrounded by natural features of "unsurpassed loveliness".

The village sits in the South Wales Coalfield and in the neighbouring quarries are often found fine fossils of calamites and lepidodendron; and, in the shale outcrops, fossil ferns and other cryptogamic plants.

== Crumlin Viaduct ==
Crumlin is famous for its former railway viaduct. Work by the designer and contractor Thomas W. Kennard commenced in autumn 1853, and the viaduct opened in June 1857 for the Taff Vale Extension to the Newport, Abergavenny and Hereford Railway. At 200 feet high and 550 yards in length in two spans (355 yards and 195 yards), it remained the highest railway viaduct in Great Britain throughout its working life.

Nearby were the two Crumlin railway stations, at high (viaduct) and valley levels. The low level station closed in 1962, and the viaduct and high level station closed in 1964 under the Beeching cuts.

Plans for preserving the viaduct were discussed, but the poor state of repair made this impossible, and it was dismantled between 1966 and 1967. Even while demolition work was in progress, scenes for the film Arabesque, which starred Sophia Loren and Gregory Peck, were shot on it. As of 2019, the abutments remain visible on the valley sides.

== Historic industry ==
Crumlin was the northern terminus of the Crumlin Arm of the Monmouthshire Canal. The canal was built from Crumlin southwards towards Newport, opening in 1794, but not completed at Fourteen Locks until 1799. Tramroads from the ironworks at Ebbw Vale and Nantyglo were built to the canal at Crumlin basin, where the iron was transhipped into canal boats.

When the viaduct was built, the canal was shortened as one of the pillars needed to be located in its path. The canal is no longer in evidence, as it was filled in the late 1960s for the construction of the A467 road.

The Crumlin Viaduct Works Company Limited produced the ironwork for the Crumlin Viaduct. They also produced the ironwork for the first Blackfriars Railway Bridge for the London, Chatham and Dover Railway, 120 bridges in Buenos Aires, Argentina, 69 bridges for the Rome and Ancona Railway in Italy, 5 multi-span bridges for railways in India, a 17-span bridge in Pernambuco, Brazil, and bridges in New Ross, Ireland, the Murray River, Australia and Wolkoff for the Great Russian Railway.

== Crumlin Navigation Colliery ==
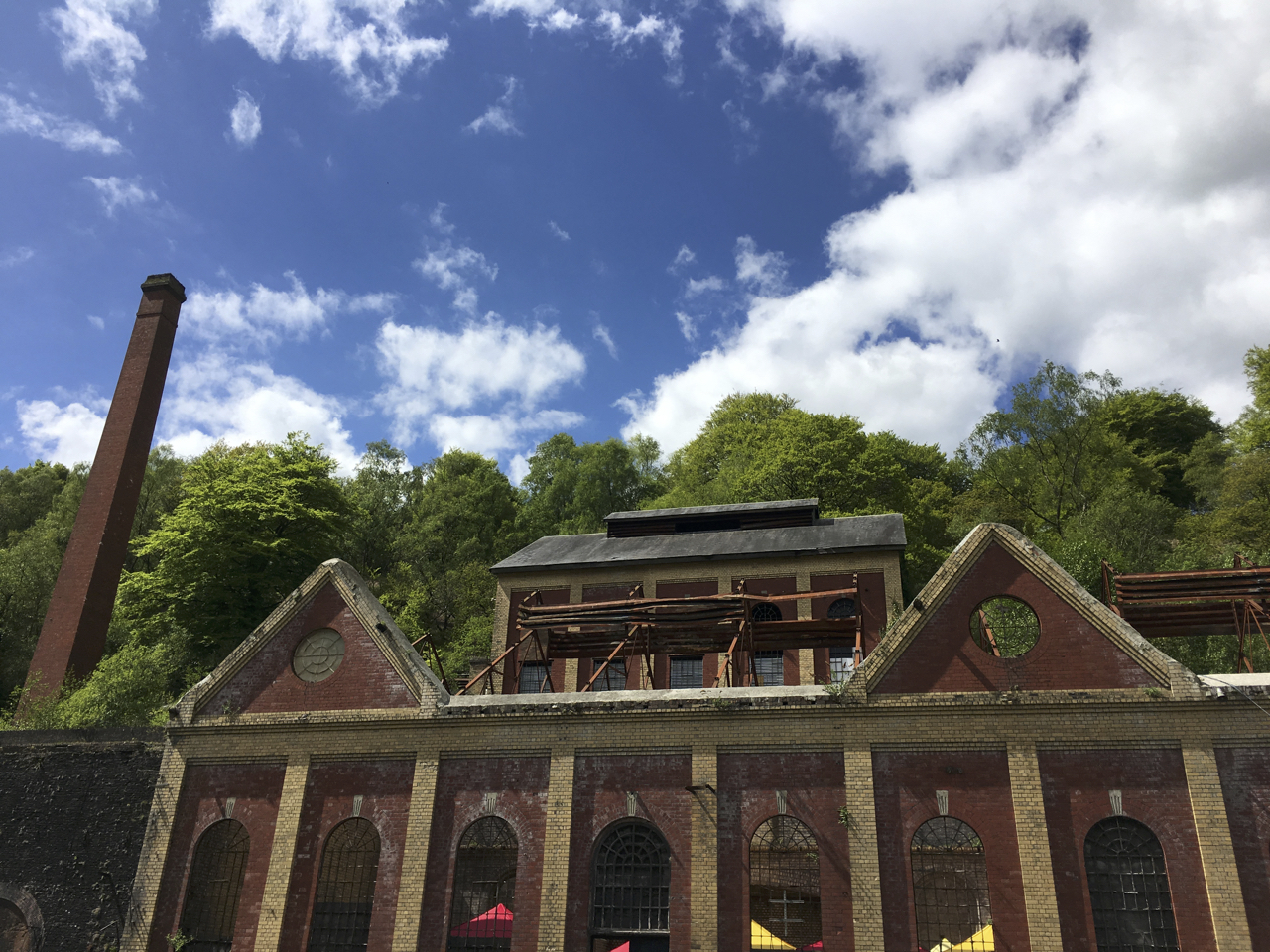
Crumlin Navigation Colliery buildings

The Navigation Colliery was in Crumlin. The sinking of mine shafts began in 1907, and it opened fully in 1911. The colliery produced 145,000 tonnes of coal annually at its peak, and it closed in 1967. Many colliery buildings remain preserved to the north of the town.

The colliery site contains thirteen Grade II and II* listed buildings and is managed by the charity Glofa Navigation Cyf for the benefit of the community.

== Crumlin Mining School ==
The Mine Rescue Station was opened in Station Road, Crumlin in 1910 and closed in 1986. It was the first in the South Wales Coalfield. In 1914, the South Wales and Monmouthshire School of Mines at Treforest established a sister school for part-time students at Crumlin Hall, which later became the Crumlin Mining and Technical College. Crumlin Hall was previously Thomas Kennard's home.

== The Crumlin Mural ==
A mosaic mural in the town centre by Kenneth and Oliver Budd depicts the history of the town and the Ebbw Valley. The viaduct is shown running along the top of a number of the panels.

The Mural

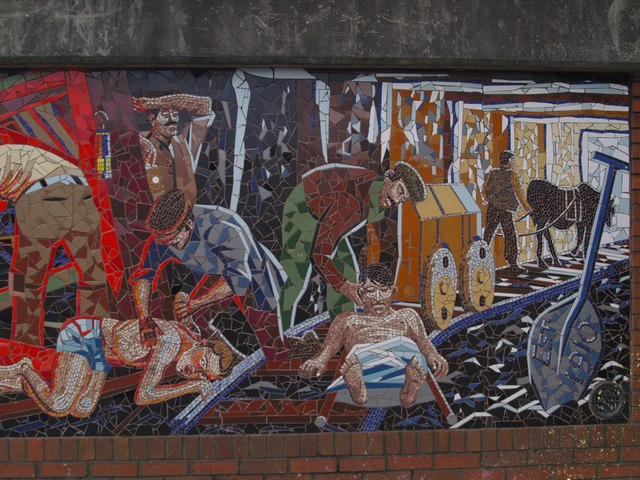

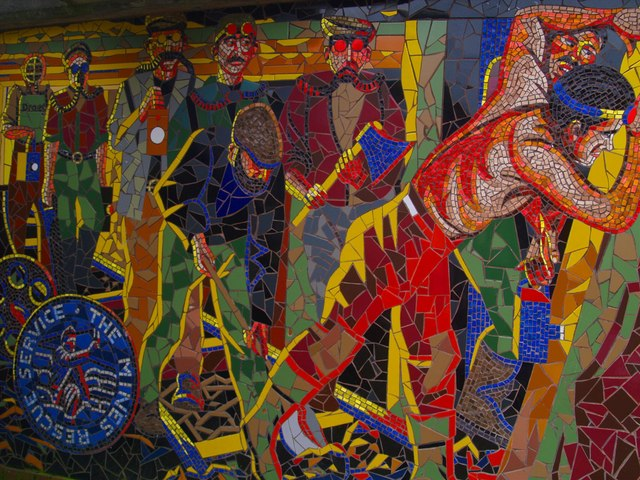

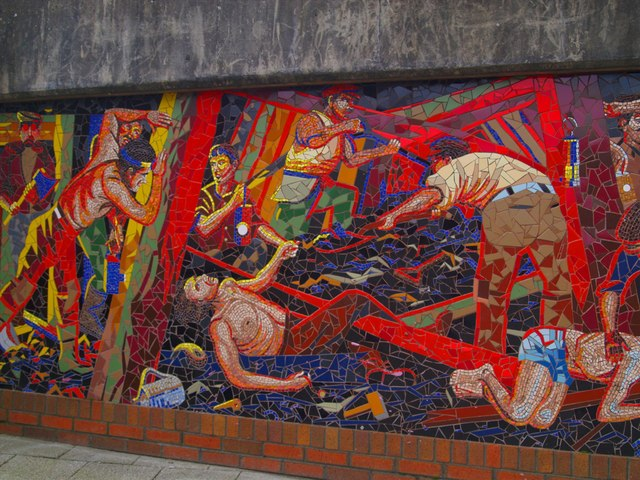

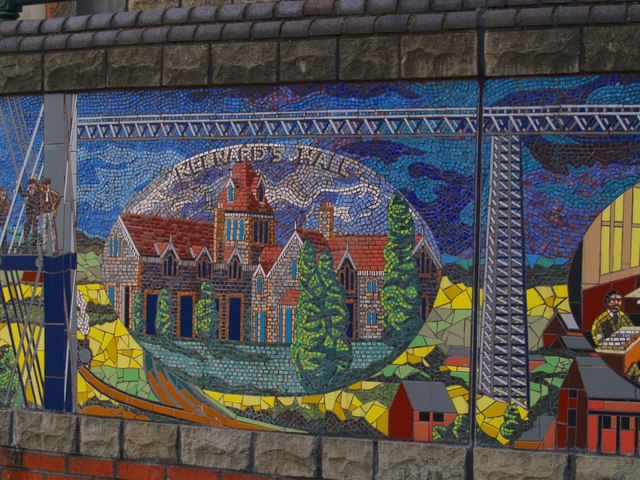

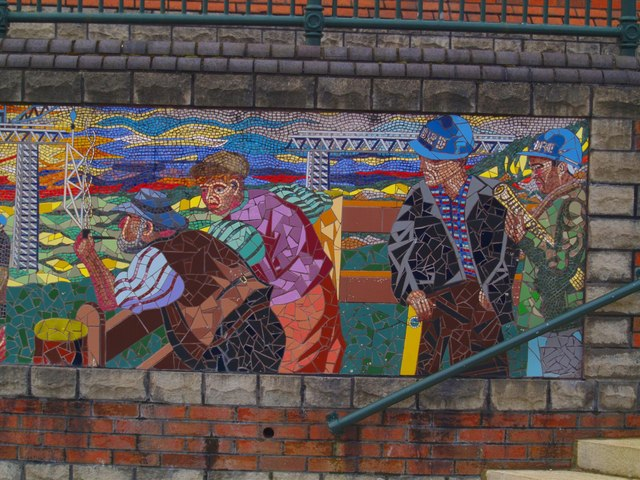

== Current industries ==
Crumlin is the base for Brace's Bakery, a third-generation owned family bakery.

In the 1980s, Marcheast Ltd. made the Land Master, a four-wheel drive vehicle, at Crumlin.

Conway Stewart, the pen manufacturer, moved to Crumlin in 1968, but the plant was closed in 1975.

Crumlin is home to the popular snack, Pot Noodle. As of 2006 it appeared in a series of TV adverts for the product. The main manufacturing plant, offices and distribution centre are situated there.

== Sport and leisure ==
Crumlin is home to rugby union club, Crumlin RFC; the team is a member of the Welsh Rugby Union and was founded in 1880. Crumlin Cricket Club is a member of the Welsh Cricket Association.

== Local democracy ==
Crumlin is represented in Caerphilly County Borough Council as a two-member ward. The current councillors are Carl Thomas (Labour) and Kristian Woodland (Labour).
