= Crindau Marina =

Coordinates: 51.59861°N 2.99142°W

Crindau Marina was a possible development in Crindau, Newport. The marina would have provided opportunities for new housing, shops and leisure facilities focused around a waterside location. Newport Unlimited, the Newport urban regeneration company, had secured £75,000 of funding from the Welsh Assembly Government’s ‘Catching the Wave’ action plan (to stimulate coastal economies in Wales), to consider the possibility of a developing a marina in Crindau. The marina would have been part of the regeneration of Newport as a whole.

== The marina's objectives ==
- Making a feature of the Monmouthshire canal terminus in Crindau
- New housing and retail development
- Waterside leisure facilities and riverside park
- Improved access to the area
- New business premises, where required, to accommodate new and existing businesses
