= Fourteen Locks =

Series of locks in Newport, Wales

Coordinates: 51.5913°N 3.0425°W

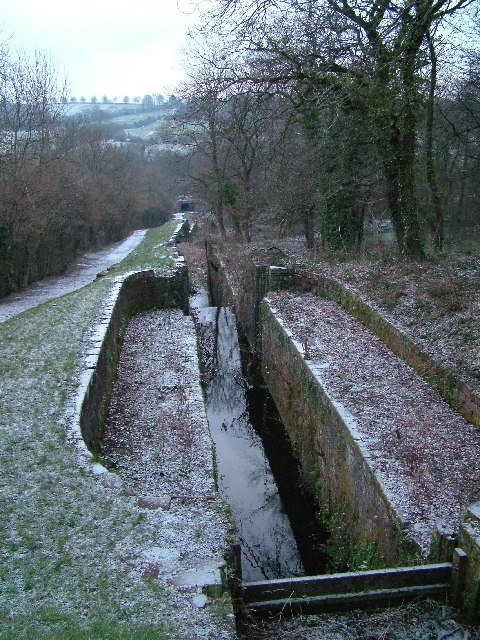
- Lock 11, February 2005. The upper part of this lock was made wider, to allow boats to pass.
- Interactive map of Fourteen Locks
- Waterway: Crumlin Arm (Monmouthshire canal)
- Operation: Manual
- First built: 1799
- Length: 64 feet 9 inches (19.7 m)
- Width: 9 feet 2 inches (2.79 m)
- Fall: 160 feet (49 m)
- Partially restored

Fourteen Locks (grid reference ST277886) is a series of locks, also known as the Cefn Flight, on the Crumlin arm of the Monmouthshire Canal at Rogerstone in Newport, South Wales. The flight of locks was completed in 1799 and raises the water level 160 ft (50 m) in just 800 yd (740 m). This is one of the steepest rises for a major run in the UK which, combined with the sheer number of locks, makes it one of the most significant in the country. The run of locks includes a series of embanked ponds, pounds, sluices and weirs to control the water supply, with no set of gates shared between individual locks. It therefore comprises a flight of locks rather than a lock staircase.

== History ==
The Monmouthshire Canal was authorised by an Act of Parliament obtained in June 1792, and consisted of a main line from Newport to Pontnewynydd, which would eventually join up with the Brecon and Abergavenny Canal once that was built, and a branch running from Crindai, now called Malpas, to Crumlin. Both sections were heavily locked, the main line rising 435 feet (133 m) through 41 locks, and the branch rising 358 feet (109 m) through 32 locks. The Rogerstone flight on the Crumlin Branch had the largest number of locks. The branch also had seven at Aber-carn and five at Allt-yr-ynn. Thomas Dadford, Jr. was appointed as the engineer for the project, although he was also working on the Glamorganshire Canal and the Leominster Canal at the time. The canal opened in phases, and by the time the main line opened in February 1796, most of the Crumlin Branch was finished apart from the 1 1/2-mile (2.4 km) section from Rogerstone to Allt-yr-ynn, which included the lock flight. The company officially announced that the work was complete in April 1799.

Dadford worked on the project until 1798, and the Rogerstone Locks were one of his major achievements. The problem of the closeness of the locks, and the consequent small pounds between them was overcome by the addition of side ponds, which minimise changes in level when a lock of water is added to the pound or removed from it. Because the canal was isolated from the main British canal network, Dadford was able to choose the size of the locks. Initial boats were built 62 feet 6 inches (19.05 m) long and 8 feet 10 inches (2.69 m) wide, but this was soon increased to 64 feet 9 inches (19.74 m) and 9 feet 2 inches (2.79 m) allowing the boats to carry between 25 and 28 tons. The precise rise of the flight seems to be debatable, with Nicholson quoting 154 feet 7 inches (47.12 m) and 168 feet (51 m) on the same page, for instance. Dadford succeeded in scaling the slope by grouping the locks, which are arranged as five pairs, and a group of three (numbers 10, 11 and 12), with lock 21 on its own.

The Monmouthshire Canal was always part of a network, most of which consisted of tram roads, many of which were owned and built by the company. The network was extended and converted for working by locomotives, so that by 1865, when the Monmouthshire company bought the Brecon and Abergavenny Canal, the canal was little used, and the amalgamation enabled them to carry more goods by rail. From 1880, the canal became part of the Great Western Railway company, who closed a short section of the branch at Crumlin in 1909, with the rest being closed by the British Transport Commission Act, passed in 1949 after the nationalisation of the canals in 1948. In the following year, Edwards wrote that the locks were inoperable, and that the canal was so choked with weed that it was scarcely canoeable.

== Restoration ==
Restoration of the Brecon and Abergavenny Canal began in 1961, as part of the creation of the Brecon Beacons National Park, but attention did not focus on the Monmouthshire Canal until 1965, when the Inland Waterways Association formed a South Wales section, after Cwmbran Council wanted to turn the section in their jurisdiction into water gardens and play parks. The group began campaigning for the protection of the remains. Two years later, the Newport (Monmouthshire) Canal Society was formed to push for restoration, and in 1968, anglers formed the Risca, Magor and St Mellons Canal Preservation Society, and the first volunteer work party on the Crumlin Branch took place in March 1969.

The first reconstruction work on the flight was in early 2003, when Cefn Lock was repaired. This enabled a trip-boat to be run on that small section. For a considerable time only the top lock was in water. The pound above Lock 21 (Top lock) suffers from an intermittent water supply. This caused problems for the volunteers of the Mon & Brec Canals Trust, who ran boat trips through the lock on several occasions between 2004 and 2006.

On 23 March 2007, a grant for £700,000 was received from the Heritage Lottery Fund, following a joint presentation by Newport City Council and the Canals Trust. This was to allow restoration of the next four locks at the top of the flight. Work on locks 20, 19, 18 and 17 started in 2010 and was completed in 2011.

The Fourteen Locks Canal and Conference Centre is next to the pound below the top lock and includes exhibits about the canal, changing displays of local art, a meeting room and a tea room. Guided walks along the canal are offered by the centre. In the first three years of operation, the centre attracted 150,000 visitors.

== Bibliography ==
- Edwards, L A (1950). Inland Waterways of Great Britain (3rd Ed). Imray Laurie Norie and Wilson.
- Gladwin, D D; Gladwin, J M (1991). The Canals of the Welsh Valleys. Oakwood Press. ISBN 978-0-85361-412-8.
- Hadfield, Charles (1967). The Canals of South Wales and the Border. David and Charles. ISBN 978-0-7153-4027-1.
- Mosse, Jonathan (2010). Waterways of Britain. Times Books. ISBN 978-0-00-787363-0.
- Nicholson (2006). Nicholson Guides Vol 4: Four Counties and the Welsh Canals. Harper Collins. ISBN 978-0-00-721112-8.
- Norris, John (2007). The Monmouthshire and Brecon Canal (5th Ed.). privately published. ISBN 978-0-9517991-4-7.
- Skempton, Sir Alec; et al. (2002). A Biographical Dictionary of Civil Engineers in Great Britain and Ireland: Vol 1: 1500 to 1830. Thomas Telford. ISBN 978-0-7277-2939-2.
- Squires, Roger (2008). Britain's restored canals. Landmark Publishing. ISBN 978-1-84306-331-5.
