= Goytre, Monmouthshire =

Coordinates: 51°44′23″N 2°59′06″W

Goytre
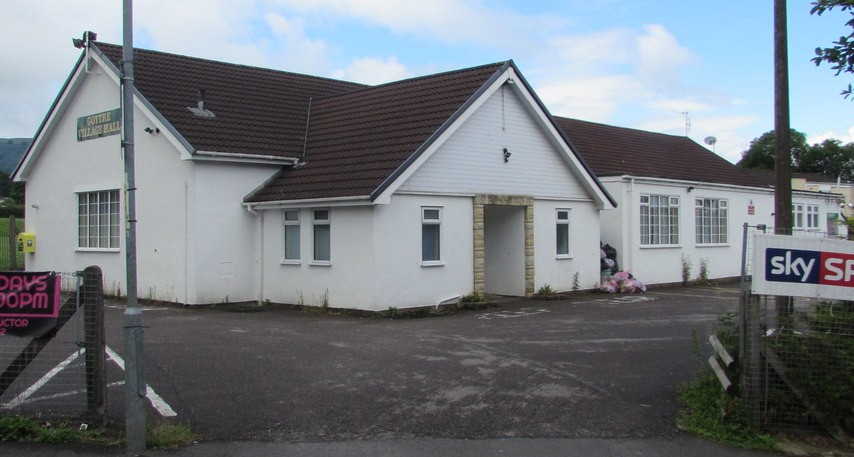
- Goytre Village Hall & Social Club

- Location within Monmouthshire
- Principal area: Monmouthshire
- Preserved county: Gwent
- Country: Wales
- Sovereign state: United Kingdom
- Post town: USK
- Postcode district: NP
- Police: Gwent
- Fire: South Wales
- Ambulance: Welsh
- UK Parliament: Monmouth

Goytre (/ˈɡɔɪtrə/; Welsh: Goetre) is a village in the community of Goetre Fawr in Monmouthshire, south east Wales, United Kingdom.

The population of the whole of Goetre Fawr, including Goytre, taken at the 2011 census was 2,393.

== Location ==
Goytre is located five miles south of Abergavenny and four miles north of Pontypool, Torfaen.

== Etymology ==
The word Goytre derives from the Welsh word for settlement/town in the woods.

== History and amenities ==
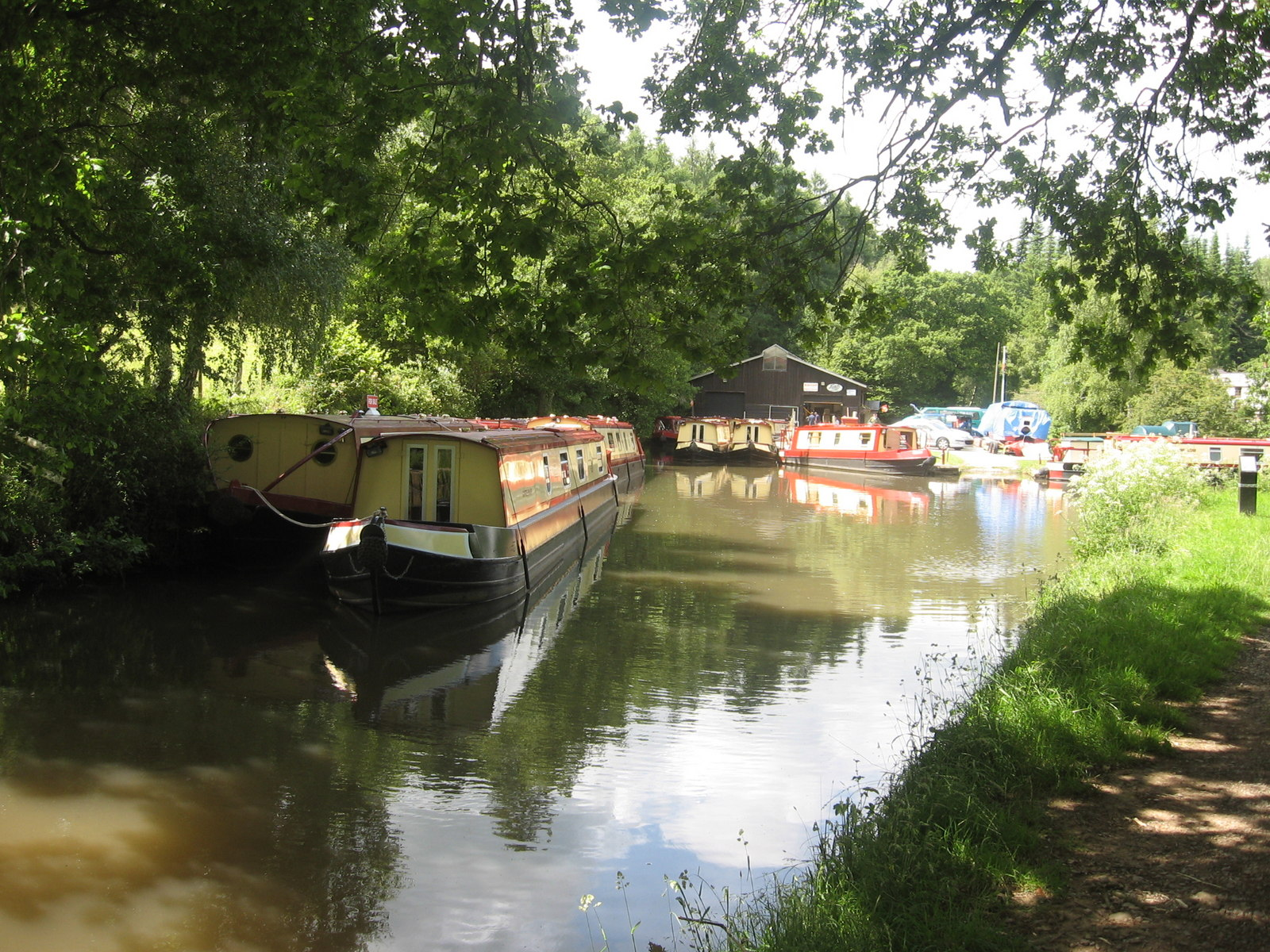
Goytre Wharf

Goytre has a canal wharf and visitor centre on the Monmouthshire and Brecon Canal , complete with interactive sculptures . The Llanover private estate, once presided over by Lady Llanover owns the surrounding land.
