= Pontymoile =

Pontymoile: Welsh: Pont-y-moel
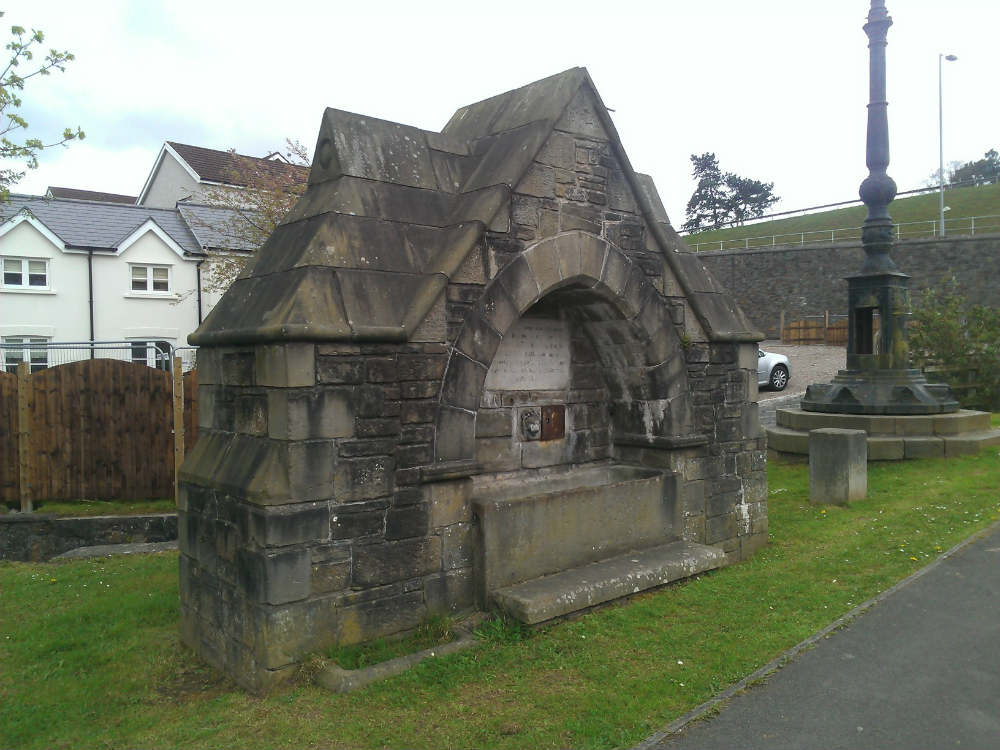
- Pontymoile Fountain

- Location within Torfaen
- Area: 8.28 km^{2} (3.20 sq mi)
- Population: 5,082 (2011)
  - Density: 614/km^{2} (1,590/sq mi)
- OS grid reference: SO 287 002
- Community: Pontymoile
- Principal area: Torfaen
- Preserved county: Gwent
- Country: Wales
- Sovereign state: United Kingdom
- Post town: PONTYPOOL
- Postcode district: NP4
- Dialling code: 01495
- Police: Gwent
- Fire: South Wales
- Ambulance: Welsh
- UK Parliament: Torfaen
- Senedd Cymru – Welsh Parliament: Torfaen
- List of places UK Wales Torfaen 51.695°N 3.027°W Map of the community

Pontymoile (Welsh: Pont-y-moel) is a suburb of Pontypool in Torfaen, South Wales. It is all but merged with the nearby suburbs of Cwmynyscoy and Upper Race.

It is a community of Torfaen, and includes the electoral wards of Brynwern, Cwmynyscoy, and Pontypool of Pontypool Community Council.

Pontymoile is directly south of Pontypool and is bordered by Griffithstown to the south and New Inn to the east. It lies within the historic county of Monmouthshire and the preserved county of Gwent. Historically it was called Llanvihangel-Point-y-moile (Welsh: Llanfihangel-Pont-y-moel).

It contains a mixture of traditional Welsh terraced houses, early Edwardian townhouses and modern 1960s flats and local authority housing.

Pontymoile is spread across a large area and so is home to much of Pontypool's facilities including West Monmouth School, Coleg Gwent's Pontypool campus, the Pontymoile Basin on the Monmouthshire & Brecon Canal as well as St. Matthew's Anglican Church and the nondenominational Pontymoile Christian Mission on Rockhill Road. Pontymoile had its own primary school. The area has a small selection of shops and public houses.

== Pontymoile Gates ==
The Pontymoile entrance to Pontypool Park was the original entrance leading to the house owned by the Hanbury family. Pontymoile Gates (Welsh: Giatiau Pont-y-moel) are Grade II*, Cadw-listed fine metal gates that are known locally as the "Sally" gates. Sally was the nickname for the Duchess of Marlborough who presented them to the Hanbury family in thanks for their assistance in the execution of her late husband's will.

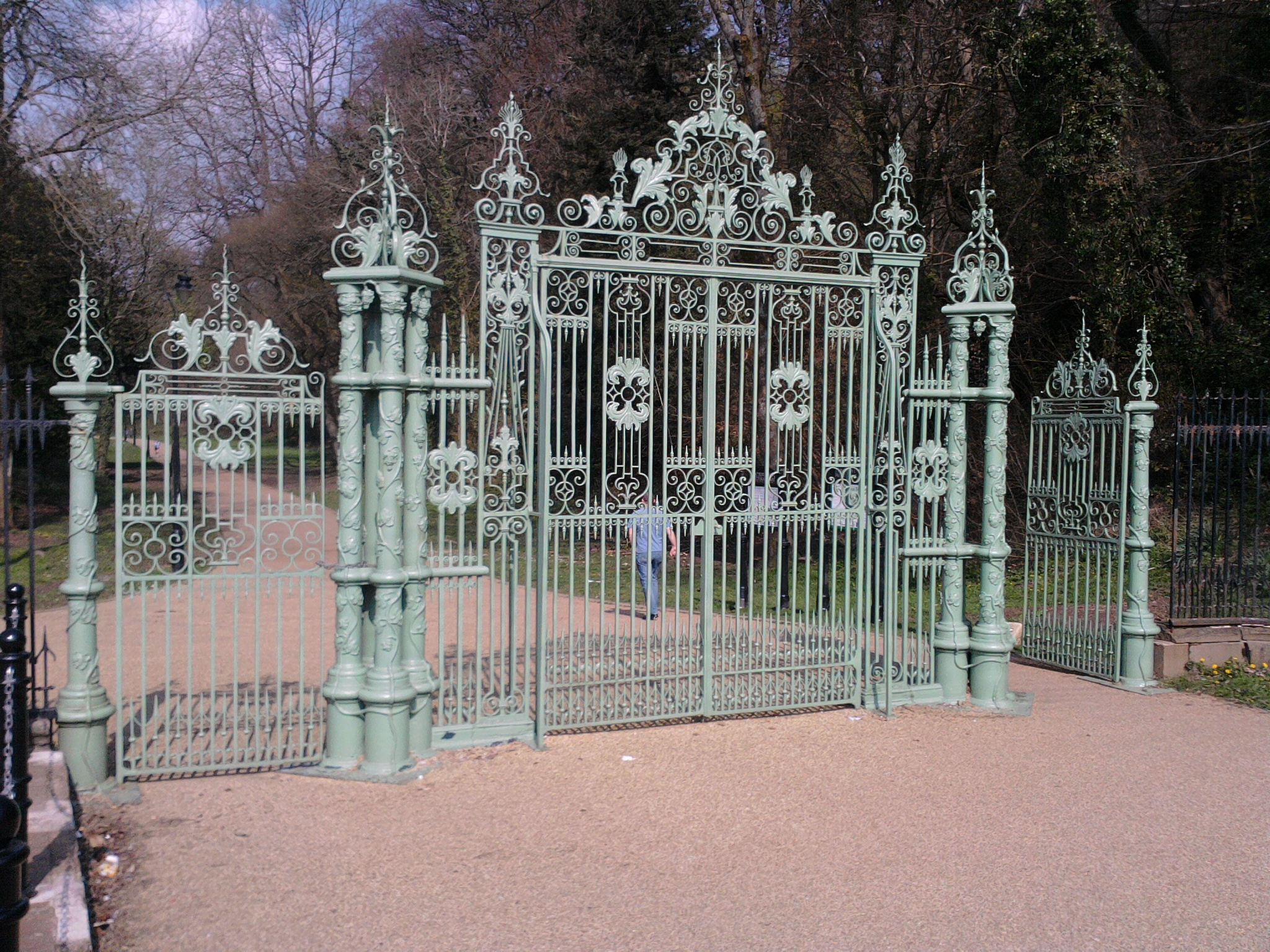
Renovated Park Gates

Research has determined that the columns and gates date from around the mid-19th century, but were later added to (the addition of dog bars) to allow larger carriages and motorised traffic to enter the park.

A report taken from the Pontypool Free Press in 1933 states that the gate's specifications were designed by T. E. Deakin in July 1835. Of particular interest are the vines on the pillars and bunches of grapes that would originally have been gilded, as were some acanthus leaves and finials on the gates. It is thought the original colour of the gates may have been green, maroon or a blue colour popular at the time.

== Redevelopment ==
Two distinct phases of road building have affected the Pontymoile area. During the early 1980s an extension to A472 was built (diverting traffic away from Griffithstown and New Inn). This ended opposite the Pontymoile Mission and the area quickly became a traffic bottle-neck as the dual-carriageway A472 filtered into a one way system.

Further redevelopment took place in the late 1990s to eradicate this bottle-neck when a new flyover on the A472 road was constructed to allow traffic to easily pass either into or by Pontypool town centre. This resulted in many buildings being demolished (including the original Pontymoile Mission, the railway viaduct and closure of the Prince of Wales public house). The development also resulted in a new road system to West Monmouth School and Coleg Gwent's Pontypool campus.
