= Charles Liddell =

English railway engineer (1813–1894)

Charles Liddell (c. 1813 – 10 August 1894) was an English railway engineer.

Born in County Durham, he was the son of Henry George Liddell, who was later Rector of Easington. His mother was Charlotte Lyon, who was the daughter of Thomas Lyon and granddaughter of Thomas Lyon, 8th Earl of Strathmore and Kinghorne. Through his mother, he would be first cousins, three times removed from Queen Elizabeth the Queen Mother. His older brother was Henry Liddell.

A student and educated by George Stephenson, he became involved in a number of Stephenson's projects, including the Grand Junction Railway and London and Birmingham Railway.

He subsequently went into partnership with L.D.B. Gordon, becoming Chief Engineer of the Newport, Abergavenny & Hereford Railway, where he drew the specifications for both the wrought iron Crumlin Viaduct and the stone Hengoed Viaduct. After surveying the route for the Bedford and Cambridge Railway, he was Chief Engineer for the London extensions for both the Midland Railway, and Great Central Main Line.

In 1838, whilst studying at the Freiburg School of Mines, Germany, L.D.B. Gordon visited the mines at Clausthal, and met Wilhelm Albert. Impressed by what he saw, he wrote to his friend Robert Stirling Newall, urging him to "Invent a machine for making wire ropes." On receipt of Gordon's letter, Newall designed a wire rope machine. On Gordon's return to the UK in 1839, he formed a partnership with Newall and Liddell, registering R.S. Newall and Company in Dundee. On 17 August 1840, Newall took out a patent for "certain improvements in wire rope and the machinery for making such rope," and R.S. Newall and Company commenced making wire ropes for "Mining, Railway, Ships' Rigging, and other purposes".

Liddell died in London on 10 August 1894.
