= Henry Liddell (disambiguation) =

Henry Liddell (1811–1898) was a British dean, headmaster and author.

Henry Liddell may also refer to:

- Henry Liddell (priest) (1787–1872), father of the dean
- Henry Liddell, 1st Baron Ravensworth (1708–1784), member of parliament for Morpeth
- Henry Liddell, 1st Earl of Ravensworth (1797–1878), British member of parliament for Northumberland, for North Durham and for Liverpool
- Henry Liddell, 2nd Earl of Ravensworth (1821–1903), British politician, member of parliament for Northumberland South

== See also ==
- Harry Liddell (1866–1931), British politician, member of parliament for West Down
