= Hafodyrynys =

Coordinates: 51.68376°N 3.11858°W

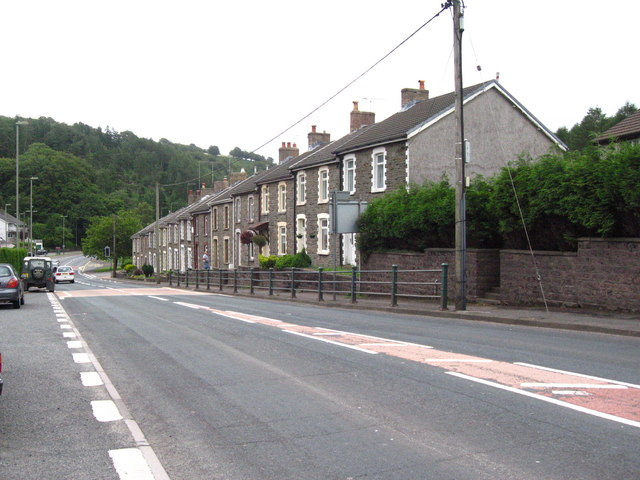
- Cottages on the A472

- Location within Caerphilly
- OS grid reference: ST227990
- Principal area: Caerphilly
- Country: Wales
- Sovereign state: United Kingdom
- Post town: NEWPORT
- Postcode district: NP11
- Dialling code: 01495
- Police: Gwent
- Fire: South Wales
- Ambulance: Welsh
- UK Parliament: Newport West and Islwyn

Hafodyrynys is a village on the A472 road between Pontypool and Crumlin in Caerphilly county borough, south-east Wales. It lies within the historic boundaries of Monmouthshire.

The village is served by an inn, a takeaway, a rugby club and car wash/valet service. As of 2008 a new housing estate has been completed on the western periphery of the village.

Since 2017, the upward climb on the A472 through Hafodyrynys has been measured as Wales' most polluted road. In 2021, following extensive investigation and compulsory purchase of the affected properties, the terraced housing directly on the A472 was demolished due to the level of air pollution observed on the road.

The village was served by the Taff Vale Extension of the Newport, Abergavenny and Hereford Railway. This ran from Pontypool to Crumlin and beyond. The 280-yard Glyn Tunnel in the village enabled the line to avoid the highest ground as it proceeded towards the Crumlin Viaduct, via Hafodyrynys Platform railway station to the west of the village. Passenger services ceased on 15 June 1964 as a result of the Beeching cuts, though coal traffic continued. Crumlin Viaduct was closed and then dismantled from 1967 onwards, resulting in coal from the colliery being extracted via the junction with the Ebbw Valley Railway.

== Hafodyrynys Colliery ==
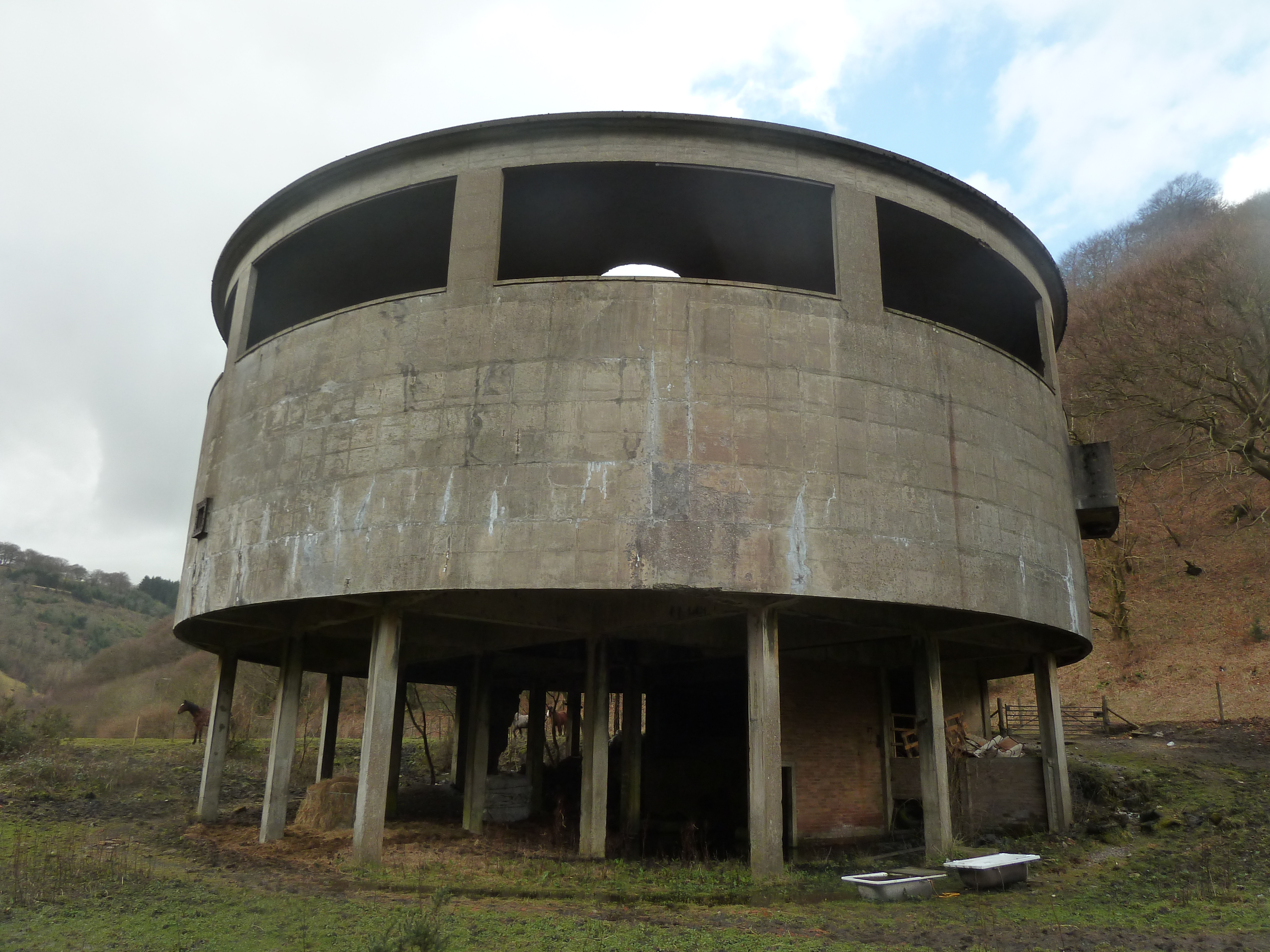
The Hafodyrynys Colliery coal washery building

Hafodyrynys Colliery was located east of the village. The first record of it is in the List of Mines for 1878–1880. There is no record of it again until 1911, when a new shaft was sunk. The mine was actively worked from 1914 until 1966. It was redeveloped by the NCB in the 1950s at a cost of £5,500,000, including the creation of new drifts. These linked Hafodyryns to coal production at the new Glyntillery drift, Tirpentwys Colliery, and the nearby Glyn Pits which did not produce coal but were used for pumping and ventilation. Despite this large investment, and the extensive new washery facilities, it never fully lived up to production expectations. The mine closed in 1966 but the washery continued to process coal from the others, brought underground and raised through the Glyntillery drift. Tirpentwys also ceased to produce coal in 1968. From 1969, Tirpentwys was used to route coal from Blaenserchan Colliery beyond it and to Hafodyrynys. Glyntillery ceased to produce coal in 1975 and from 1977, Blaenserchan's coal was instead raised through Abertillery Colliery.

The site was cleared in 1985, but the circular slimes settling tank of the washery was retained at the request of the landowner, Sir Richard Hanbury-Tenison. Today the remains of the washery are a listed building and mark the site of the mine.
