= Treowen Halt railway station =

Disused railway station in Wonastow, Monmouthshire

Treowen Halt

General information
- Location: Wonastow, Monmouthshire; Wales
- Coordinates: 51.6672°N 3.1482°W
- Grid reference: ST206971

Other information
- Status: Disused

History
- Original company: Great Western Railway

Key dates
- 14 March 1927: Opened
- 11 July 1960: Closed
Location

Treowen Halt railway station served the village of Wonastow, Monmouthshire, Wales, from 1927 to 1960 on the Newport, Abergavenny and Hereford Railway.

== History ==
The station was opened on 14 March 1927 by the Great Western Railway. It closed on 11 July 1960.

Preceding station	Disused railways	Following station
Crumlin High Level; Line and station closed	Great Western Railway; Newport, Abergavenny and Hereford Railway	Pentwynmawr Platform; Line and station closed
