= Maesycwmmer =

Maesycwmmer: Welsh: Maesycwmer
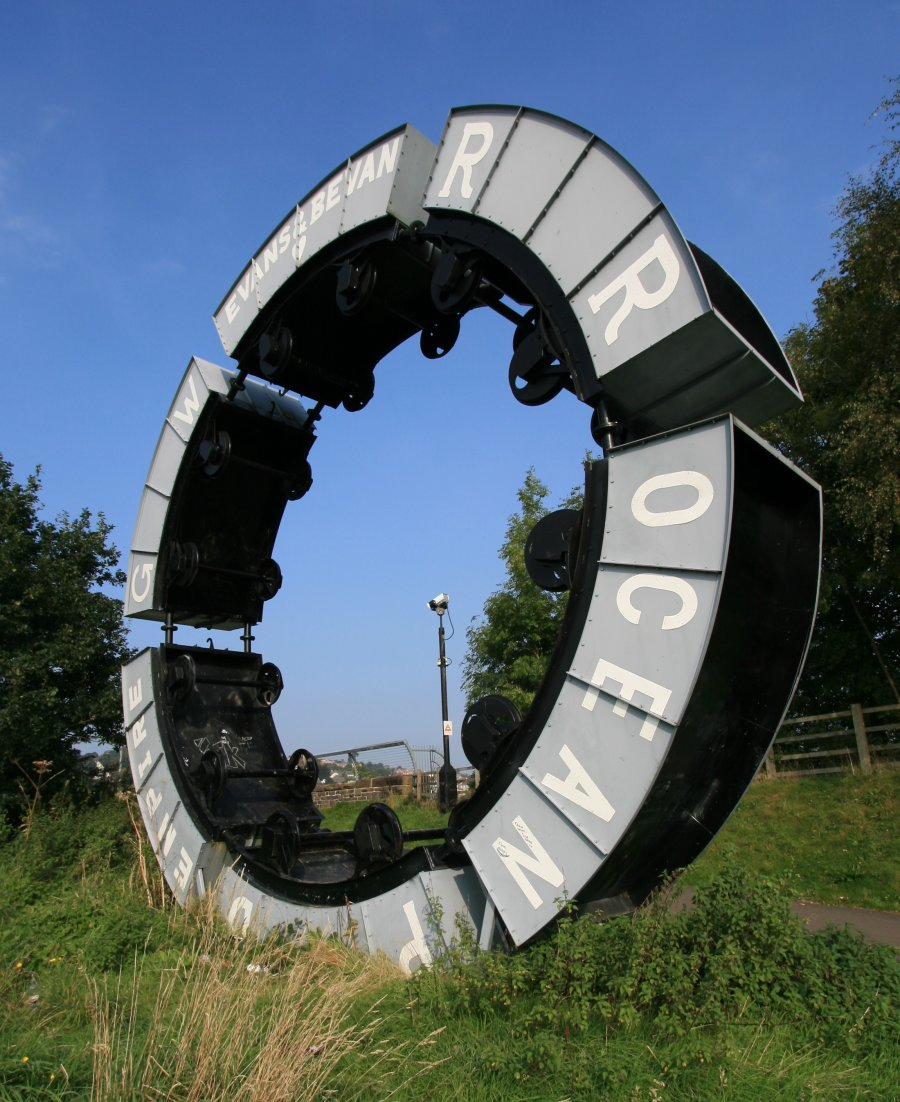
- Wheel o Drams by Andy Hazell

- Location within Caerphilly
- Population: 2,242 (2011)
- OS grid reference: ST156948
- Community: Maesycwmmer
- Principal area: Caerphilly
- Preserved county: Gwent
- Country: Wales
- Sovereign state: United Kingdom
- Post town: HENGOED
- Postcode district: CF82
- Post town: BLACKWOOD
- Postcode district: NP12
- Dialling code: 01443
- Police: Gwent
- Fire: South Wales
- Ambulance: Welsh
- UK Parliament: Islwyn
- Senedd Cymru – Welsh Parliament: Islwyn
- List of places UK Wales Caerphilly 51.642°N 3.223°W Map of the community

Viaduct

Maesycwmmer (Welsh: Maesycwmer) is a village, community and electoral ward in the centre of Caerphilly County Borough in Wales, within the historic boundaries of Monmouthshire.

== Location ==
Maesycwmmer is located 5 miles (8 km) north of Caerphilly, on the east bank of the Rhymney River, opposite Hengoed, which is within the historic boundaries of Glamorgan. It is a community in Caerphilly County Borough.

== History & amenities ==
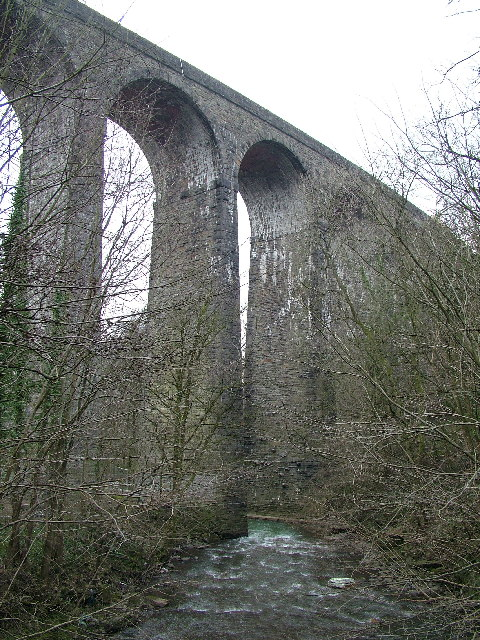
Centre section of the Maesycwmmer Viaduct.

Maesycwmmer is still overshadowed by the vast Maesycwmmer (or Hengoed) Viaduct, which dates from 1853 and which carried the Taff Vale Extension of the Newport, Abergavenny and Hereford Railway over the Rhymney valley. In 2000 the viaduct was re-opened for public pedestrian access.

Today the village features the "Wheel o Drams" (locally known as "The Stargate") sculpture by Andy Hazell, an unusual piece of modern art formed from a circle of coalmining dram trucks to commemorate the industrial heritage of this locality within the history of the South Wales Valleys. The village shared three railway stations with neighbouring Hengoed over the years (see Hengoed railway station).

Maesycwmmer was a creation of the Industrial Revolution in the South Wales Coalfield. The houses built along the main road were purpose-built for the workers that built the Maesycwmmer to Hengoed Viaduct. There is also a disused quarry in a field behind the houses of St Annes Gardens.

Maesycwmmer has both a junior and a senior football team. The senior team, Maesycwmmer FC, was founded in 2010 and played in the North Gwent Football League. Matches were played at The Bryn, just outside Maesycwmmer. A new Maesycwmmer FC was founded in 2024.

== Governance ==
Maesycwmmer is also an electoral ward, coterminous with the community boundaries, which elects a councillor to Caerphilly County Borough Council.

Since 1999 it has been part of the Caerphilly constituency for elections to the Welsh Senedd. The constituency for elections to the UK Parliament is also called Caerphilly.

== Notable people ==
Maesycwmmer has been home to several notable individuals, including Craig Roberts, an accomplished actor, writer, and director known for his work in film and television; Mary Bridges-Adams (née Daltry), an influential educationalist born in the village in 1854; and Josh Hicks, a comic book artist recognized for his illustration work.

== Filming location ==
Craig Roberts' debut feature, Just Jim, filmed in Maesycwmmer throughout August of 2014. The film is inspired by his early life in Maesycwmmer and was released in 2015.

The first series of the S4C drama 35 Diwrnod (2014) was filmed in Maesycwmmer.

== Sports ==
- Maesycwmmer Football Club (2010, Re-established 2024)
