= Hafodyrynys Platform railway station =

Disused railway station in Hafodyrynys, Caerphilly

Coordinates: 51.6816°N 3.1269°W

Hafodyrynys Platform

General information
- Location: Hafodyrynys, Caerphilly County Borough; Wales
- Platforms: 2

Other information
- Status: Disused

History
- Original company: Great Western Railway
- Pre-grouping: Great Western Railway

Key dates
- 1 January 1913: Station opened
- 15 June 1964: Station closed
Location

Hafodyrynys Platform railway station was a station on the former Taff Vale Extension of the Newport, Abergavenny and Hereford Railway. It served the village of Hafodyrynys, and was located near to the western portal of the 280 yd Glyn Tunnel.

| Preceding station | Disused railways | Following station |
|---|---|---|
| Crumlin High Level | Great Western Railway; Newport, Abergavenny and Hereford Railway | Crumlin Valley Colliery Platform |
