= Llangattock Court =

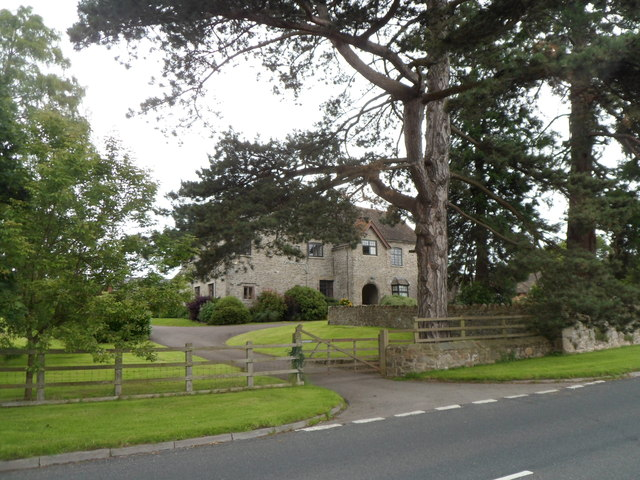
- "Wholly unplanned"

- Location within Monmouthshire
- 51.787°N 2.9687°W
- Type: House
- Location: Penpergwm, Monmouthshire, Wales

History
- Built: c.15 century

Site notes
- Architectural style: Vernacular
- Governing body: Privately owned

Listed Building – Grade II*
- Official name: Llangattock Court
- Designated: 9 January 1956
- Reference no.: 1990

Llangattock Court, Penpergwm, Monmouthshire, Wales, is a country house of late-medieval origins. Cadw gives a date for original building of 1490-1520. In the 17th century, the house was substantially reconstructed for the Wroths. Further rebuilding took place in the early 20th century. In the later 20th century, the building fell into ruin, before a substantial reconstruction in 1985-2000. It is a Grade II* listed building.

== History ==
The origin of the house is late-medieval, possibly 1490-1520. This building would have formed a traditional hall-house, with a cross passage and a solar. In the early 1600s, the building was reconstructed for the Wroth family. Further rebuilding took place in the early 20th century, with a building date of 1913 inscribed above the front door. Following dereliction in the later 20th century, a further reconstruction took place between 1985-2000. In 2013, the Court was for sale with a guide price of £850,000.

== Architecture and description ==
The architectural historian John Newman describes the Court as "wholly unplanned". His Gwent/Monmouthshire volume in the Buildings of Wales series calls the Court, Llangattock House". The building is of stone, in an L-shaped plan. Sir Cyril Fox and Lord Raglan, in their multi-volume history, Monmouthshire Houses, record a "monumental fireplace". Cadw describes this feature as, "a very large and fine c1600 moulded stone fireplace". The Court is a Grade II* listed building.
