= Pontypool railway station =

Pontypool railway station may refer to:

- Pontypool and New Inn railway station, to the south east of Pontypool town centre
- Pontypool Clarence Street railway station (closed), on the Newport, Abergavenny and Hereford Railway Taff Vale Extension
- Pontypool Crane Street railway station (closed), on the Monmouthshire Railway and Canal Company line
