= Hengoed =

Village in Caerphilly, Wales

Coordinates: 51.65°N 3.23°W

- Location within Caerphilly
- Population: 5,548
- OS grid reference: ST154950
- Community: Gelligaer
- Principal area: Caerphilly
- Preserved county: Gwent
- Country: Wales
- Sovereign state: United Kingdom
- Post town: HENGOED
- Postcode district: CF82
- Dialling code: 01443
- Police: Gwent
- Fire: South Wales
- Ambulance: Welsh
- UK Parliament: Caerphilly
- Senedd Cymru – Welsh Parliament: Caerphilly

Hengoed (/ˈhɛnɡɔɪd/) is a village on the west side of the Rhymney Valley - between Ystrad Mynach to the south and Cefn Hengoed to the north. Across the valley it looks towards Maesycwmmer. The village is in the county borough of Caerphilly, in the traditional county of Glamorgan, Wales.

The electoral ward of Hengoed includes the villages of Hengoed and Cefn Hengoed and a part of Tir-y-Berth in the north west. The ward population was recorded at 5,548 in the 2011 census, an increase of 10% over the previous 10 years (2001 = 5,046), due in part to several new-build housing developments in the ward between 2001 and 2011.

The name means 'old wood' in Welsh.

== Governance ==
=== Westminster ===
The ward of Hengoed falls within the parliamentary constituency of Caerphilly. The current Member of Parliament for Caerphilly is Chris Evans, MP who represents the Labour Party.

=== Senedd ===
The Senedd member for the Caerphilly constituency is Lindsay Whittle MS of Plaid Cymru.

=== Caerphilly Council ===
The Hengoed ward has two seats on Caerphilly Council. Both are currently held by Plaid Cymru. The Councillors are Donna Cushing and Teresa Parry.

== Geography ==
=== Geological Structure ===
Hengoed and Cefn Hengoed occupy a low plateau of Pennant Sandstone typical of much of the South Wales coalfield, between the Nant Cylla (eng. Cylla Brook) to the east and the River Rhymney to the west rising to a high point of 213 metres between the two villages.

== Demography ==
The latest census data relates to the 2011 census. These figures are for the Hengoed ward including Cefn Hengoed

=== Population ===
Total population: 5,548

Males: 2,707 Females: 2,841

Aged 0–24 1,923 (35%) Aged 60+ 975 (17.5%)

=== Ethnicity ===
White: 98.6%

Other: 1.4%

=== Welsh language ===
10.8% are Welsh speakers.

== Amenities ==
Hengoed has a primary school, community centre, a post office and a public house - The Junction. There is also a linear park, along the old railway line which connected Penallta Colliery with Hengoed Viaduct and beyond. The viaduct and park are part of the Celtic Trail cycle route, with easy access from the station car park.

== Public Services and Facilities ==
Hengoed railway station is part of the Valley Lines network. Around 85 trains call at the station every weekday. From the station, trains run southbound to Cardiff Central. Services operate northbound to Rhymney. Passenger services are operated by Transport for Wales.

The village is served by bus route 3 operated by Crossgates Coaches with buses travelling south to Ystrad Mynach and north to Bargoed, Rhymney, and Merthyr Tydfil. This route travels along Hengoed Road to the west of the village.

The A469 to the east of the village carries the Stagecoach South Wales service number 50, north to Bargoed and south to Caerphilly and Newport with a half-hourly service in each direction during weekdays. The service stops just below the railway station on the main road.

== Notable people ==
- Gren (Grenfell Jones MBE) (13 June 1934 - 4 January 2007), one of Wales's best-known and longest-serving newspaper cartoonists, was born in Hengoed.
- Raymond John Bishop (born 24 November 1955), a former Welsh professional footballer was born in Hengoed.
