= Hengoed railway station =

Railway station in Caerphilly, Wales

Hengoed
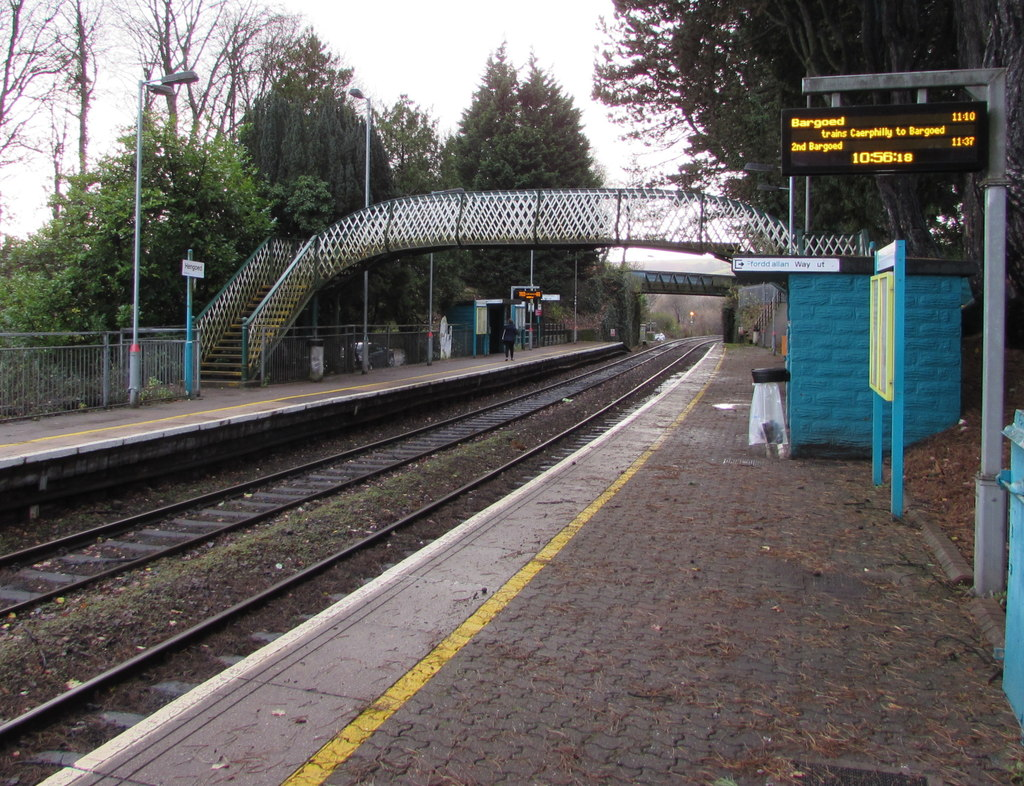

General information
- Location: Hengoed, Caerphilly; Wales
- Coordinates: 51°38′50″N 3°13′31″W
- Grid reference: ST153949
- Manager: Transport for Wales
- Platforms: 2

Other information
- Station code: HNG
- Classification: DfT category F2

History
- Opened: 1858

Passengers
- 2021/22: ▲73,330
- 2022/23: ▲0.106 million
- 2023/24: ▲0.124 million
- 2024/25: ▲0.129 million
- 2025/26: ▼95,244
Location
Notes
- Passenger statistics from the Office of Rail and Road

Hengoed railway station (Welsh: Gorsaf reilffordd Hengoed) serves the village of Hengoed in the county borough of Caerphilly, South Wales. It is a stop on the Rhymney Line of the Valley Lines network.

== History ==
The current station was initially named Hengoed & Maesycwmmer when opened by the Rhymney Railway in 1858. Then on railway grouping into the Great Western Railway in 1923 it became known as Hengoed Low Level to avoid confusion.

=== Hengoed High Level railway station ===
Immediately adjacent, and crossing Hengoed Low Level was another station which originally shared the name Hengoed & Maesycwmmer, serving the Taff Vale Extension from Pontypool to Quakers Yard (and ultimately Neath). This station was renamed in 1923 to Hengoed High Level. The High Level station was immediately at the end of the Hengoed Viaduct, which carried the line across the Rhymney valley to Maesycwmmer. It was closed in June 1964. The line is disused, but the viaduct has been restored and is now part of the National Cycle Network. Some remains of the platforms have also been preserved.

=== Maesycwmmer railway station ===
The towns shared a third railway station on the former Rumney Railway, which on amalgamation with the Brecon and Merthyr Tydfil Junction Railway was called Maesycwmmer & Hengoed. In 1923 it was renamed simply Maesycwmmer.

== Services ==
The Monday to Saturday daytime service pattern is four trains an hour southbound to Cardiff Central: three continue to Barry Island and one to Bridgend. Northbound four trains an hour run to Bargoed with two of those continuing to Rhymney. The frequency decreases in the evening.

On Sundays, the service pattern is one train an hour southbound to Cardiff Central and Barry Island, and one an hour northbound to Rhymney.

Preceding station	National Rail	Following station
Ystrad Mynach	Transport for Wales; Rhymney Line	Pengam
