= Penpergwm =

Village in south Wales

Coordinates: 51.785°N 2.978°W

- Location within Monmouthshire
- OS grid reference: SO 325103
- Principal area: Monmouthshire
- Country: Wales
- Sovereign state: United Kingdom
- Post town: ABERGAVENNY
- Postcode district: NP7
- Dialling code: 01873
- Police: Gwent
- Fire: South Wales
- Ambulance: Welsh
- UK Parliament: Monmouth
- Senedd Cymru – Welsh Parliament: Monmouth

Penpergwm is a village in south Wales, situated along the A40 road, 3.9 miles (6.3 km) south-east of Abergavenny and 14 miles (23 km) west of Monmouth. The site of Castell Arnallt lies on a mound in the water meadows between the village and the River Usk.

The village used to have a railway station on the Welsh Marches Line, but it closed in 1958. The former station house is now a private residence. The former British politician Francis Pym was born in Penpergwm Lodge in the village.

== Description ==
Penpergwm is a roadside village in Monmouthshire lying on the A40 road between Abergavenny and Raglan. Its ribbon of houses occupies a low spur of Old Red Sandstone beside the flood-meadows of the River Usk, with the Black Mountains closing the skyline to the north-west. A minor lane drops south-east to the medieval earthwork of Castell Arnallt, a well-preserved circular motte 6 m high that commanded the Usk crossing and is now a scheduled monument.

The manorial centre passed in the eighteenth century to the Nightingale family, whose estate map of 1760 shows a cluster of farms and a coaching inn called the Bridge House. Estate fragmentation after 1918 allowed local architect Henry Avray Tipping to buy the Home Farm and create Penpergwm Lodge, a small arts-and-crafts house set in five hectares of formal terraces and specimen trees; Cadw lists the gardens at Grade II for their accomplished early-twentieth-century design.

Penpergwm gained a station on the Welsh Marches line when the Newport, Abergavenny and Hereford Railway opened in 1854. The modest brick buildings were replaced by Great Western Railway timber huts after a fire in 1911, but declining passenger numbers led to closure on 5 January 1958; the former station house survives in private use and the double-track main line still carries hourly services between Cardiff and Manchester.

A census output area centred on the village recorded 172 residents in 68 households in 2021, with 34 per cent able to speak Welsh and 27 per cent aged over sixty-five. Penpergwm today supports a nursery garden, a touring-caravan site and a cluster of holiday cottages, while commuters use the nearby A40 and rail station at Abergavenny four miles to the north-west. The former Conservative cabinet minister Francis Pym, Baron Pym (1922–2008) was born at Penpergwm Lodge; his family retained the property until after the Second World War.
