= Nantyderry railway station =

Disused railway station in Nant-y-derry, Gwent

Nantyderry
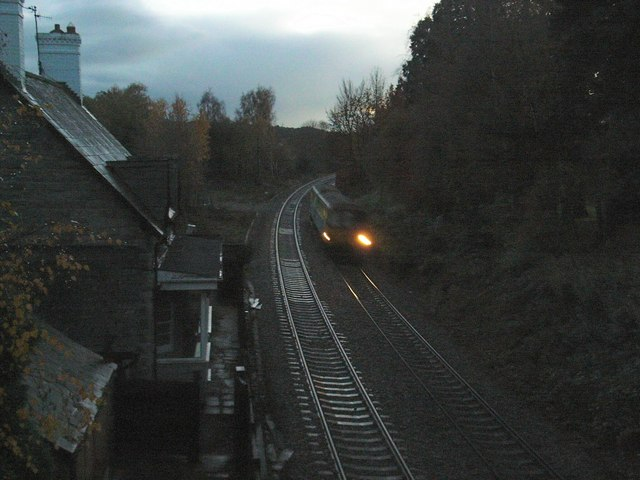
- A Northbound train passes the site of the station at Nant-y-derry, November 2006

General information
- Location: Nant-y-derry, Monmouthshire; Wales
- Coordinates: 51.7494°N 2.9703°W
- Grid reference: SO331060
- Platforms: 2

Other information
- Status: Disused

History
- Original company: Newport, Abergavenny and Hereford Railway
- Pre-grouping: Great Western Railway
- Post-grouping: Great Western Railway

Key dates
- 2 January 1854: Opened
- 9 June 1958: Closed
Location

Nantyderry railway station was a former station which served the Monmouthshire village of Nant-y-derry. It was located on the Welsh Marches Line between Pontypool and Abergavenny.

== History ==
The station opened on 2 January 1854 by the Newport, Abergavenny and Hereford Railway. It was known as Nantyderry or Goitre in Bradshaw until it was changed in April 1859. It was omitted from Bradshaw from May 1859 until November 1859.

The station closed in 1958. The double line remains in use.

The adjacent Foxhunter Inn was originally the tea-room for the station.

== Accidents ==
An accident occurred to the north of the station on 12 November 1856, killing 2 passengers. A southbound passenger train came off the line, due to a broken spring on the locomotive. As people were escaping, the wreckage was hit by a northbound goods train that could not stop in time.

Preceding station	Historical railways	Following station
Llanvair; Line open, station closed	Great Western Railway; Newport, Abergavenny and Hereford Railway	Little Mill Junction; Line open, station closed
