= St Devereux railway station =

Former railway station in Herefordshire, England

St Devereux
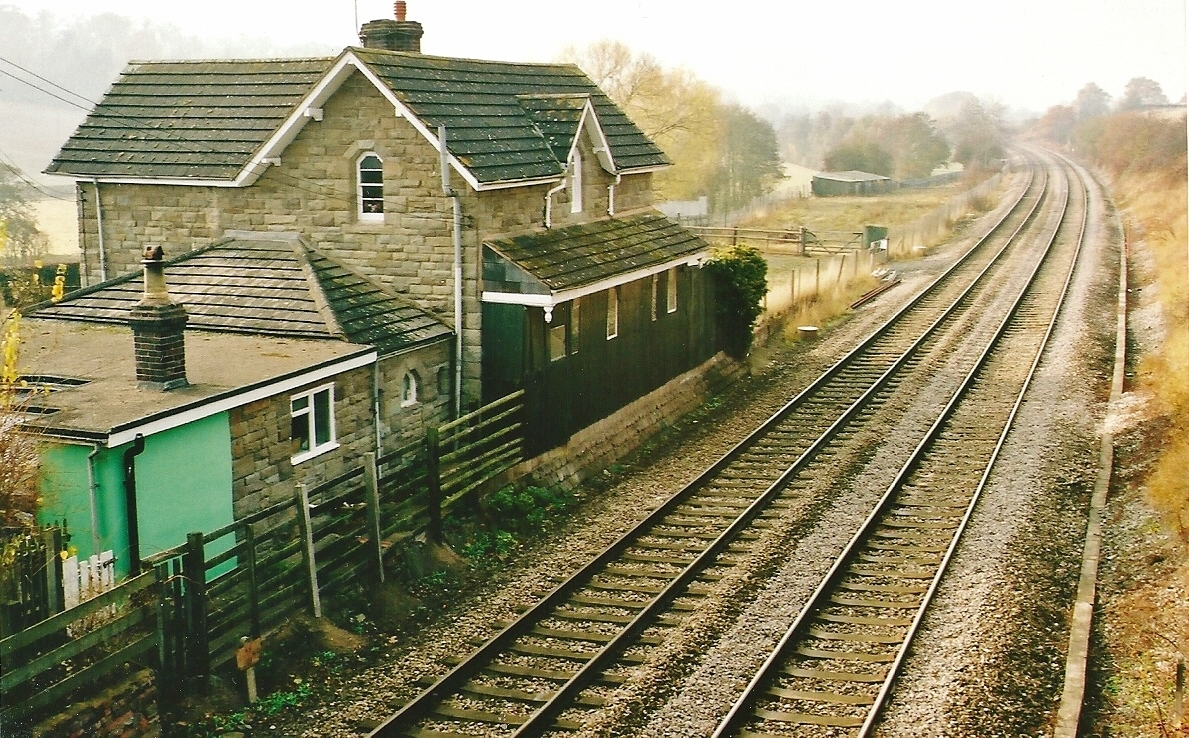
- St Deveraux station building in 2003

General information
- Location: Kilpeck, Herefordshire; England
- Coordinates: 51.9747°N 2.8156°W
- Grid reference: SO440310
- Platforms: 2

Other information
- Status: Disused

History
- Original company: Newport, Abergavenny and Hereford Railway
- Pre-grouping: Great Western Railway
- Post-grouping: Great Western Railway

Key dates
- 2 January 1854: Opened
- 9 June 1958: Closed
Location

St Devereux railway station was a station in Kilpeck, Herefordshire, England. The station was opened in 1854 and closed in 1958.

Preceding station	Historical railways	Following station
Pontrilas; Line open, station closed	Great Western Railway; Newport, Abergavenny and Hereford Railway	Tram Inn; Line open, station closed
