= Crumlin Viaduct =

Former viaduct crossing the Ebbw River and Crumlin

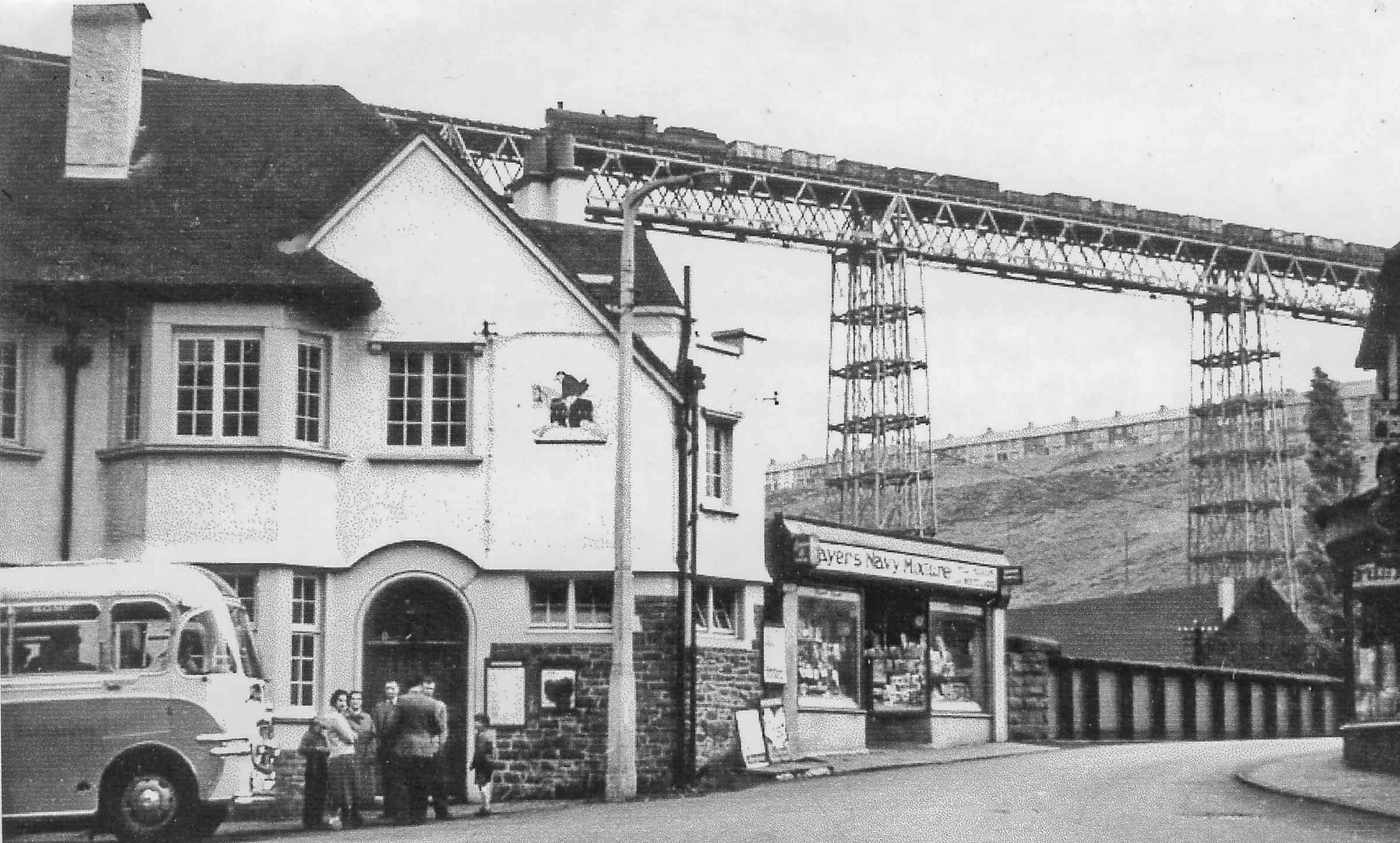
- Crumlin Viaduct in 1957
- Coordinates: 51°40′49″N 3°08′23″W
- Carries: Taff Vale Extension
- Crosses: Ebbw River
- Locale: Monmouthshire
- Owner: Newport, Abergavenny and Hereford Railway; British Railways

Characteristics
- Material: Wrought iron, stone pillars and supports
- Total length: 1,650 ft (502.9 m) (1,066 ft (324.9 m) + 584 ft (178.0 m))
- Height: 200 feet (61 m); Highest railway viaduct in the United Kingdom throughout its working life
- Longest span: 150 feet (46 m)
- No. of spans: 7 (Ebbw) + 3 (Kendon)

History
- Architect: Charles Liddell
- Designer: Thomas W. Kennard
- Engineering design by: Falkirk Iron Co
- Fabrication by: Falkirk Iron Co
- Construction start: 1853
- Construction end: 1857
- Construction cost: £62,000 (£41 7s per foot) (£6.262m at 2014 prices)
- Opened: 1 June 1857
- Closed: 1964

Location
- Interactive map of Crumlin Viaduct

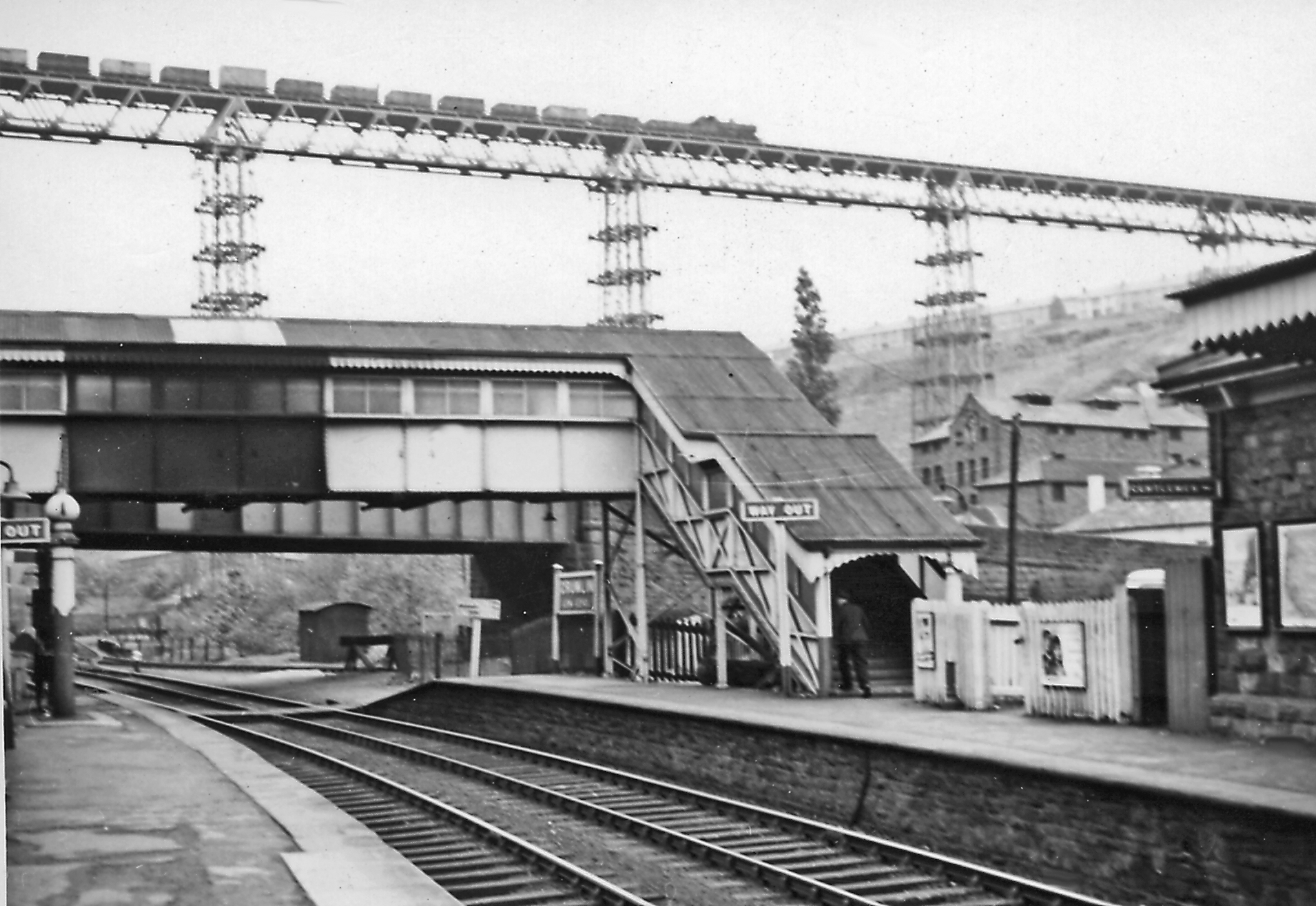
The viaduct passing by Crumlin Low Level Station

The Crumlin Viaduct was a railway viaduct located above the village of Crumlin in South Wales, originally built to carry the Taff Vale Extension of the Newport, Abergavenny and Hereford Railway (NA&HR) across the Ebbw River.

Hailed as "one of the most significant examples of technological achievement during the Industrial Revolution", in its 107 years of service until being dismantled in 1965, it remained: the least expensive bridge for its size ever constructed; the tallest railway viaduct in the United Kingdom; the third tallest viaduct in the world, after the aqueduct at Spoleto, Italy, and the timber viaduct in Portage, New York state.

== Background ==
During the Industrial Revolution, and the mass-extraction of coal from South Wales, there was a resultant growth in construction of railways into the South Wales Coalfield. The Taff Vale Railway so monopolised the trade of shipping coal to Cardiff Docks, that mine owners were desperate for competitor railway companies to both improve speeds of shipping, provide access to new markets, and hence reduce shipping rates.

The London and North Western Railway had developed a route for the industrialised West Midlands and Northwest England, by controlling the Llanfihangel Railway and the Grosmont Railways as feeder lines into the Hereford Railway, and hence onwards via the joint GWR/LNWR controlled Shrewsbury and Hereford Railway. This allowed shipment of goods from Pontypool and the Ebbw Valley to Hereford. However, access to the productive Rhymney Valley and Rhondda Valley coalfields was at best restricted, having to route trains south to Cardiff along the TVR, then along the South Wales Railway to Newport via the GWR, before being able to access LNWR controlled track.

The UK Parliament approved an Act of Parliament on 3 August 1846, the construction of the Taff Vale Extension, which would connect Coedygric North Junction at Pontypool with the TVR/GWR at Quakers Yard, and hence allow direct and LNWR controlled access. The LNWR approved the required capital expenditure, and merged the existing three railways and the extension project in the new Newport, Abergavenny and Hereford Railway.

== Construction ==
The route for the Taff Vale Extension required the construction of two significant viaducts across two major river valleys: one across the Ebbw River; and one across the Rhymney River, the Hengoed Viaduct.

The Ebbw Valley posed two significant challenges through its geography:

- Its height, created both a structural problem and a wind problem, as the valley funnelled and hence increased wind speed
- It is actually two valleys, the Ebbw and the smaller Kendon

Chief Engineer Charles Liddell concluded that stone would be a poor choice for construction of a suitable bridge, as additional stone would need to be shipped to the valley, and the height of the resulting structure would result in an unstable and high-maintenance bridge. Further, the solidity of a stone structure would create additional compressed wind flow around the rail tracks, resulting in a possible safety hazard for passengers and train crew. Overall, the required over-engineered result would also have been very expensive. His recommendation therefore to the board was for a cast-iron structure.

Two tender responses were received by August 1852, with Liddell's recommendation for a design by Scottish civil engineer Thomas W. Kennard, using an amended design using the Warren truss. Contracts were signed in December 1852, with a stipulated completion date of 1 October 1857. After further experimentation with his design system at his father's Blaenavon Ironworks, the iron structures were cast at Kennard's Falkirk Ironworks and shipped to Newport Docks.

Kennard began construction in October 1853 by building the Crumlin Viaduct Works on the east bank. Here castings from Falkirk were brought together with wrought iron from Blaenavon, and all fitting and fabrication work took place. After shortening the spur from the Monmouthshire and Brecon Canal, and with the land between the two valleys acting as the ninth pier, the first girder was hoisted into place on 3 December 1854. The completed structure linking Pontypool Clarence Street railway station in the north via the Bryn Tunnel (398 yards (364 m)) to the viaduct east end, came by the end of May 1857.

Testing began that same month, in front of the Board of Trade Inspector, Colonel Wynne. Six locomotives loaded with pig iron or lead weighing a total of 370 long tons (380 t) were placed in charge of locomotive driver "Mad Jack" of Pontypool, who before making his first crossing had visited every public house in Crumlin. Mad Jack was actually John Thomas Jenkins, a locomotive driver born in 1821. He raced across the viaduct despite being told to go slowly. Upon completing the crossing he told the angry engineer "when eternity looks you straight in the face, you may as well go at full speed to meet it!" He died at 65 still in service with London and North Western Railways. After a series of tests, during which a deflection of less than 1.5 inches (38 mm) was measured, the bridge was approved for use in the same month.

== Operations ==
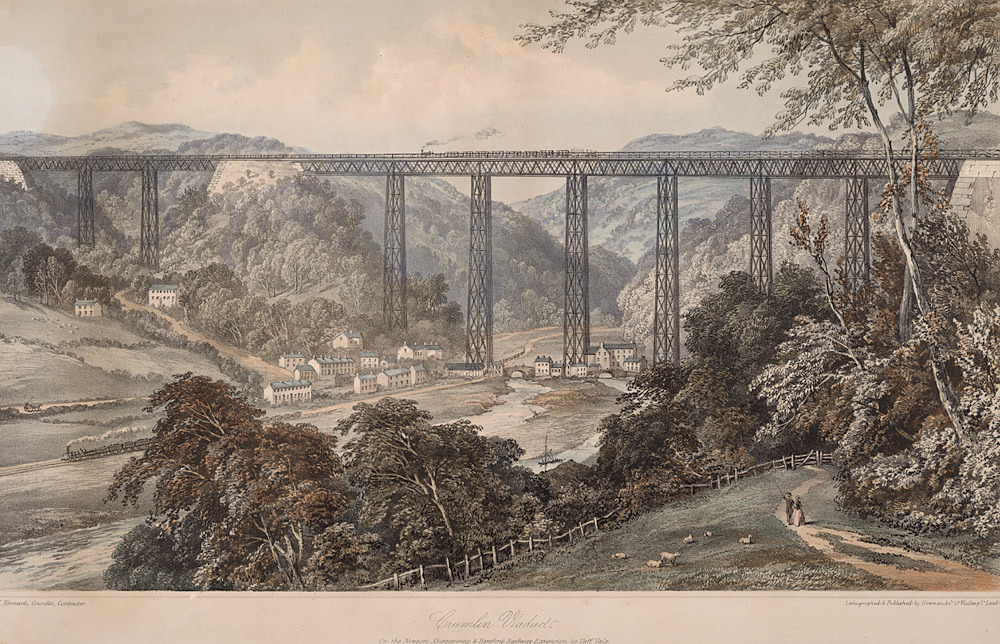
Lithograph 1860

The viaduct was opened on Whit Monday, 1 June 1857 by Lady Isabella Fitzmaurice, with the first train crossing the bridge and entering the Bryn Tunnel in June 1854, but it could not proceed further as Kennard's construction team had not yet finished the Hengoed Viaduct, which he had won the contract to design and act as civil engineer on. The final Crumlin viaduct, at 200 feet (61 m) high and 1,650 feet (500 m) across its two spans and ten trusses in length (1,066 feet (325 m) and 584 feet (178 m)), remained the highest railway viaduct in Great Britain throughout its working life. Nearby were the Crumlin railway stations, both at high (viaduct) and valley levels.

As Liddell predicted, the location proved to be susceptible to high winds and resultant swaying, resulting in continual expensive maintenance. The NA&HR route, due to a combination of its height and steepness, proved to be one of the most expensive railway lines in all of the UK to operate. It was therefore no surprise when, following the post-World War II nationalisation, British Railways reduced the entire extension line to single track after 1947.

== Closure and demolition ==
As a result of the Beeching Axe, the last booked westbound scheduled passenger train ran over the viaduct on Saturday 13 June 1964, the 8.55 p.m. from Pontypool Road to Aberdare (High Level), arriving at 10.09 p.m., which was booked to stop at Crumlin (High Level) at 9.20 p.m. The very last eastbound train over the Vale of Neath line was the 8.45 p.m. from Neath (General) to Aberdare (High Level) which on Saturdays was extended from Aberdare to Pontypool Road arriving there at 11.18 p.m., calling at Crumlin (High Level) at 10.54 p.m. but apparently ran only as far as Aberdare on that date.

Preservation of the historic viaduct was discussed, and the structure was scheduled as being of architectural and historical interest by the Ministry of Housing and Local Government. But while the stone Hengoed Viaduct survived, a structural survey of the cast-iron Crumlin Viaduct showed its poor state, and resultant need for high investment to secure its future, let alone ongoing maintenance costs. The decision was therefore made to dismantle it because, by then, housing had extended into the lower valley area.

In the period between closure of the NA&HR and dismantling operation beginning, scenes for the Universal Pictures film Arabesque, which starred Sophia Loren and Gregory Peck, were shot both on and around the viaduct. Its demolition, by Bird's of Swansea, began in June 1965 and took nine months, with the help of a Bailey bridge.

The iron parts of the bridge had been completely dismantled by the end of 1967, and only the stone and cast concrete abutments now remain visible on the valley sides.

The abutments are visible at: 51°40′51.19″N 3°08′14.55″W, 51°40′47.48″N 3°08′30.07″W & 51°40′44.16″N 3°08′36.79″W

== Gallery ==
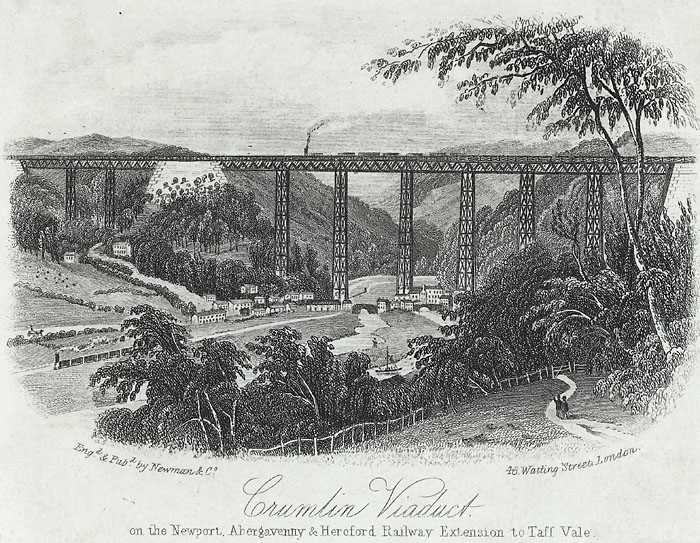
Crumlin viaduct on the Newport, Abergavenny & Hereford railway extension to Taff vale ca 1865 by Newman and Co. (London, England)

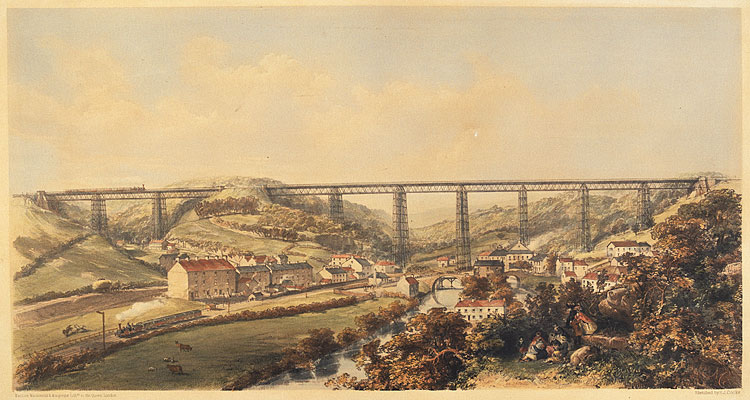
Crumlin Viaduct, on the Taff Vale Extension of the West Midland Railway ca 1855 by H J Cooke, fl ca 1855 and Maclure, Macdonald and Macgregor (lithographers), Engraver

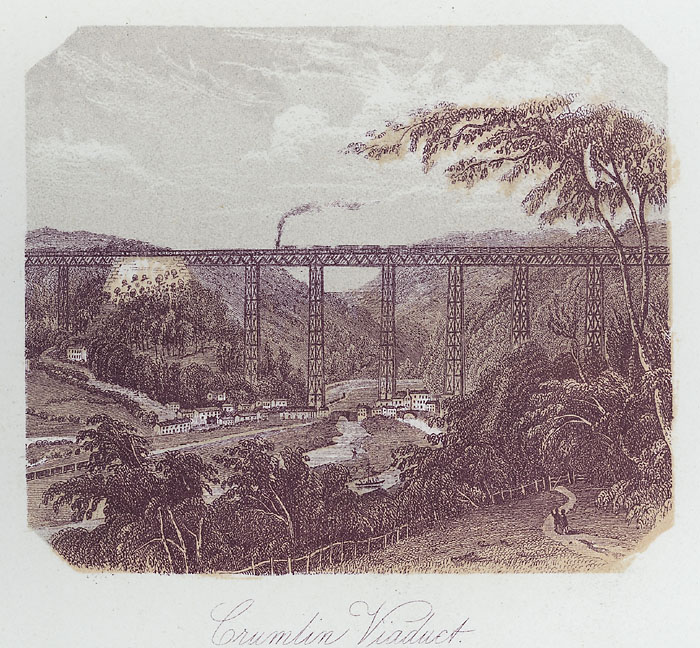
Crumlin viaduct. On the Newport, Abergavenny & Hereford railway extension to Taff vale ca 1865
