= Castell Arnallt =

Ruined castle in Wales

- Monmouthshire, Wales
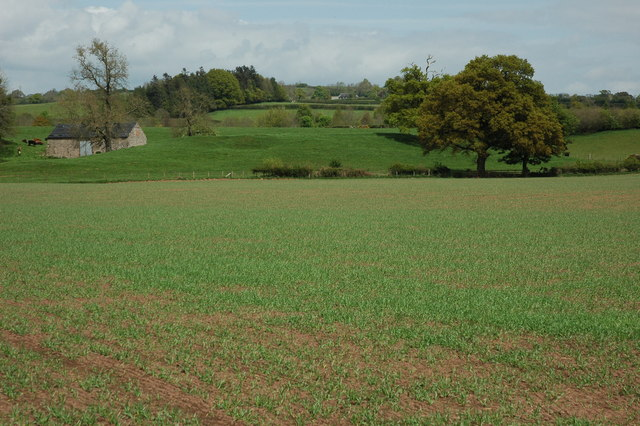
- Site of Castell Arnallt

Site information
- Type: Castle
- Condition: Earthworks - no other visible remains

Location
- Shown within Wales
- Coordinates: 51.785°N 2.987°W

The site of Castell Arnallt, sometimes known as Castle Arnold, is located near the village of Llanover in the Usk valley of Monmouthshire, Wales, some 4 miles (6.4 km) south east of Abergavenny. It was the fortified court house, or llys, of Seisyll ap Dyfnwal, lord of Over Gwent or Gwent Uwchcoed, before it was destroyed after Seisyll and some of his household were killed at Abergavenny Castle by William de Braose in 1175. The land is now in agricultural use, with no remains visible.

== History ==
=== Origin ===
Castell Arnallt was a medieval fortification, believed to have been the fortified residence of the Welsh rulers of Over Gwent or Gwent Uwch Coed. Together with other manors in the area, it formed part of the estates of Dyfnwal ap Caradog, who may have been based at Penpergwm near Abergavenny.

=== Use and destruction in the 12th century ===
King Henry II of England recognised Dyfnwal's son, Seisyll ap Dyfnwal, as lord of Over Gwent or Gwent Uwchcoed, with the honour of Abergavenny castle, in return for releasing a hostage, Hugh de Beauchamp. As part of the peace proceedings between The Lord Rhys and Henry II, Seisyll, the Lord Rhys’s brother in law, was persuaded to give the Honour of Abergavenny Castle to William de Braose. Abergavenny Castle was attacked in 1175 and Henry Fitzmiles was killed, reputedly by Seisyll. The Fitzmiles estate, including Abergavenny Castle, passed to William de Braose, the husband of Henry's sister Bertha.

De Braose called Seisyll to his castle for Christmas in 1175, telling him that his intention was reconciliation. Also invited were other leaders from Gwent and Seisyll's son Geoffrey. In retribution for FitzMiles' death, De Braose had the men killed in the castle's great hall during a feast, an episode known as the Massacre of Abergavenny. His actions included seizing Seisyll's land. While Seisyll was at Abergavenny Castle, Castell Arnallt was attacked by retainers of William de Braose, who razed it in a surprise attack and killed Seisyll's other son Cadwaladr. Seisyll's wife was either kidnapped or killed during the raid. The final destruction of the castle is dated to 1177.

=== Subsequent use ===
In 1325 Castell Arnallt was part of the estates gifted to Sir William de Hastings, a relative of the lord of Abergavenny. The only known use of the site after the castle was destroyed is agriculture. The site has been surveyed, but has not been excavated. It has been scheduled as an Ancient Monument since 1947.

== The current site ==
All that remains of the castle is a large, oblong mound. It sits in pasture land used for grazing, on the edge of the flood plain of the River Usk. There are two enclosures, one on top of the mound and one its western side. It appears, from examination of the mound, that there may be structures, a gate, and masonry walls below the surface, built over a period of time. It is believed to have been a llys, or royal court, used for administrative purposes and built prior to 1175. It was considered likely to have been built without a motte, relying on natural formations.
