= Pentwynmawr Platform railway station =

Disused railway station in Pentwynmawr, Caerphilly

Pentwynmawr Platform

General information
- Location: Pentwynmawr, Glamorganshire; Wales
- Coordinates: 51.6612°N 3.1639°W
- Grid reference: ST195964

Other information
- Status: Disused

History
- Original company: Great Western Railway

Key dates
- 8 February 1926: Opened
- 21 April 1952: closed to regular passengers (continued for miners and schoolchildren)
- 15 June 1964: Closed
Location

Pentwynmawr Platform railway station served the suburb of Pentwynmawr, in the historical county of Glamorganshire, Wales, from 1926 to 1964 on the Newport, Abergavenny and Hereford Railway.

== History ==
The station was opened on 8 February 1926 by the Great Western Railway. It closed to passengers on 21 April 1952. It still remained open to workers and schoolchildren with season tickets but it became unstaffed. It closed to workers on 31 January 1961 and closed completely on 15 June 1964.

Preceding station	Disused railways	Following station
Treowen Halt; Line and station closed	Great Western Railway; Newport, Abergavenny and Hereford Railway	Penar Junction Halt; Line and station closed
