= Llanvair railway station =

Short-lived railway station in Llanvair Discoed, Gwent

Llanvair

General information
- Location: Llanfair Kilgeddin, Monmouthshire; Wales
- Coordinates: 51.7589°N 2.9728°W
- Grid reference: SO329071

Other information
- Status: Disused

History
- Original company: Newport, Abergavenny and Hereford Railway
- Pre-grouping: Newport, Abergavenny and Hereford Railway

Key dates
- 2 January 1854: Opened
- 1 October 1854: Closed
Location

Llanvair railway station served the village of Llanfair Kildeggin, in the historical county of Monmouthshire, Wales, in 1854 on the Newport, Abergavenny and Hereford Railway.

== History ==
The station was opened on 2 January 1854 by the Newport, Abergavenny and Hereford Railway. It was a very short-lived station, only being open for just under nine months before closing on 1 October 1854.

Preceding station	Historical railways	Following station
Penpergwm; Line and station open	Newport, Abergavenny and Hereford Railway	Nantyderry; Line open, station closed
