= Henry Liddell (priest) =

English CoE clergyman (1787-1872)

Henry George Liddell (1787 — 9 March 1872) was an English priest of Church of England.

Liddell was born at Ravensworth Castle, the son of Sir Henry Liddell, 5th Baronet. He studied at Brasenose College, Oxford, was ordained in 1811 and was appointed rector of Redmarshall that year. He was subsequently rector of Boldon in 1814, Romaldkirk in 1824, Whickham in 1829 and Easington in 1832.

On 11 November 1809, he married Charlotte Lyon, a daughter of Thomas Lyon and granddaughter of Thomas Lyon, 8th Earl of Strathmore and Kinghorne. They had six children, two of whom also became priests in the Church of England.

- Henry George (1811-1898), priest
- Thomas John (1812-1842)
- Charles (1813-1894), railway engineer
- Charlotte Maria Elizabeth (1815-1896)
- Amelia Frances (1818-1898)
- William Wren (1824-1892), priest

Liddell died at Charlton Kings, Oxfordshire on 9 March 1872, aged 85.
