= Penpergwm railway station =

Disused railway station in Penpergwm, Monmouthshire

Penpergwm
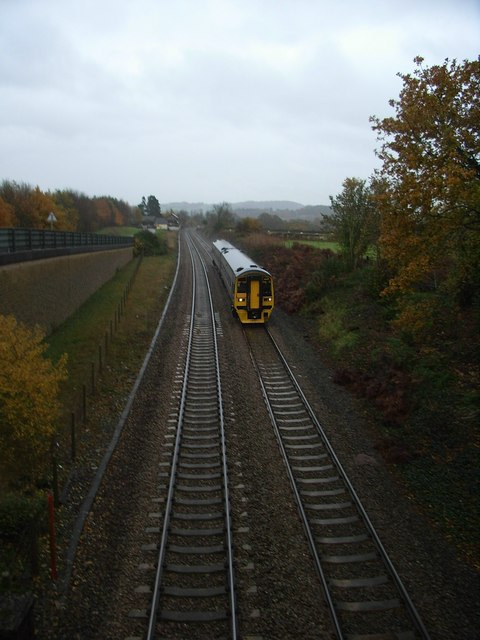
- A northbound train passes the site of the former station in 2006

General information
- Location: Penpergwm, Monmouthshire; Wales
- Coordinates: 51.7846°N 2.9793°W
- Grid reference: SO325100
- Platforms: 2

Other information
- Status: Disused

History
- Original company: Newport, Abergavenny and Hereford Railway
- Pre-grouping: Great Western Railway
- Post-grouping: Great Western Railway

Key dates
- 2 January 1854: Opened
- 9 June 1958: Closed
Location

Penpergwm railway station was a former station which served the Monmouthshire, Wales, village of Penpergwm, although the community adjacent to the station was very small and it could equally be said to have served the larger village of Llangattock Nigh Usk (Llangatwg Dyffryn Wysg in Welsh) which lay less than 1/2 mile (0.8 km) away to the east. It was located on the Welsh Marches Line between Pontypool (formerly Pontypool Road) and Abergavenny.

The former station house is now a private residence.

The station closed in 1958. The double line remains in use and carries a regular service of trains between Cardiff, Newport and Hereford.

== Accidents ==
The station appears to have been the scene of a surprising number of accidents recorded in local newspapers:

- 4 April 1865. Thomas Morley, a platelayer, while avoiding the path of one train was hit by a pilot engine on the other.
- 1871 attempted derailment
- December 1890. 'A pick-up goods train was being shunted from the up line across the down line into the yard to bring out some laden trucks, when another goods train, coming from Abergavenny and bound for Newport, dashed into it and cut it in two. The accident was due to the steep gradient and the inability of the driver of the through goods train to pull up in time to avert the mischief.'
- 7 January 1895. 'As Mr George Hughes, of Penpergwm Farm, was crossing the line at Penpergwm Station on Monday evening, about half-past five, he was knocked down by the northern express train and cut to pieces.'
- August 1898. Wm. E. Price was crossing the line, thinking the approaching train was stopping, and was hit and killed by a northbound express train.
- May 1917. Farmer cut to pieces by express train travelling at 50 mph.

Preceding station	Historical railways	Following station
Abergavenny Monmouth Road	Great Western Railway; Newport, Abergavenny and Hereford Railway	Llanvair; Line open, station closed
