= Josh Hicks =

Cartoonist and filmmaker

Josh Hicks is a Welsh cartoonist, filmmaker and author. Born in 1991 and raised in Maesycwmmer, he is best known for the graphic novels Glorious Wrestling Alliance: Ultimate Championship Edition, Hotelitor: Luxury-Class Defense and Hospitality Unit, and his work on Dark Horse Comics' series of licensed Minecraft comics. His directorial debut, the animated BBC Wales short Spectre of the Bear, was nominated for Best Short Film at the 2024 Bafta Cymru Awards.

== Career ==
Josh Hicks began his comics career in 2016 by self-publishing Glorious Wrestling Alliance in minicomic format. Hicks published three issues in this format before the series was collected in a mass-market edition titled Glorious Wrestling Alliance: Ultimate Championship Edition by Lerner Publishing Group in 2021. Lerner went on to publish Hicks' Hotelitor: Luxury-Class Defense and Hospitality Unit in 2024.

Hicks co-directed two animated music videos for Foo Fighters in 2021, and in 2023 directed the animated short film Spectre of the Bear, starring Bill Nighy and Craig Roberts. The film received nominations at both the British Animation Awards and BAFTA Cymru Awards. That year, Hicks also directed a short based on his Glorious Wrestling Alliance comics.

Hicks wrote and illustrated Minecraft: Out of Order Volume 1 for Dark Horse Comics in 2025. The same year, Walker Books announced that they would be publishing Hicks' YOU VS series of illustrated choose-your-path adventure novels.

== Selected bibliography ==
- Glorious Wrestling Alliance: Ultimate Championship Edition (2021)
- Hotelitor: Luxury-Class Defense and Hospitality Unit (2024)
- Minecraft: Out of Order Volume 1 (2025)

== Selected filmography ==
- Spectre of the Bear (2023)
- Glorious Wrestling Alliance (2023)
