= Tram Inn railway station =

Former railway station in Herefordshire, England

Tram Inn
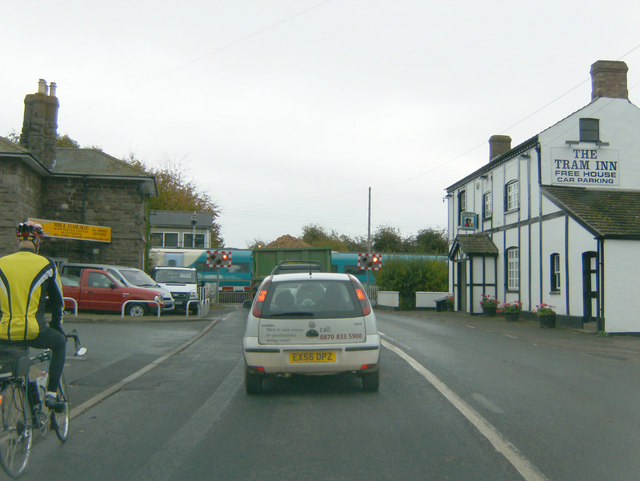
- The site of the station, now marked by the level crossing, in 2009

General information
- Location: East of Thruxton, Herefordshire; England
- Coordinates: 51.9982°N 2.7822°W
- Grid reference: SO464335
- Platforms: 2

Other information
- Status: Disused

History
- Original company: Newport, Abergavenny and Hereford Railway
- Pre-grouping: Great Western Railway
- Post-grouping: Great Western Railway

Key dates
- 2 January 1854: Opened
- 9 June 1958: Closed to passengers
- 1964: closed
Location

Tram Inn railway station was a station to the east of Thruxton, Herefordshire, England. It was named after a local public house, itself named after a tramway that carried coal into Hereford before the modern railway.

The railway station was originally opened by the Newport, Abergavenny and Hereford Railway in 1854. It was closed to passengers in 1958 and closed completely in 1964.

Preceding station	Historical railways	Following station
St Devereux; Line open, station closed	Great Western Railway; Newport, Abergavenny and Hereford Railway	Hereford Barton; Line and station closed
