= Henry Liddell =

British classical scholar and administrator (1811–1898)

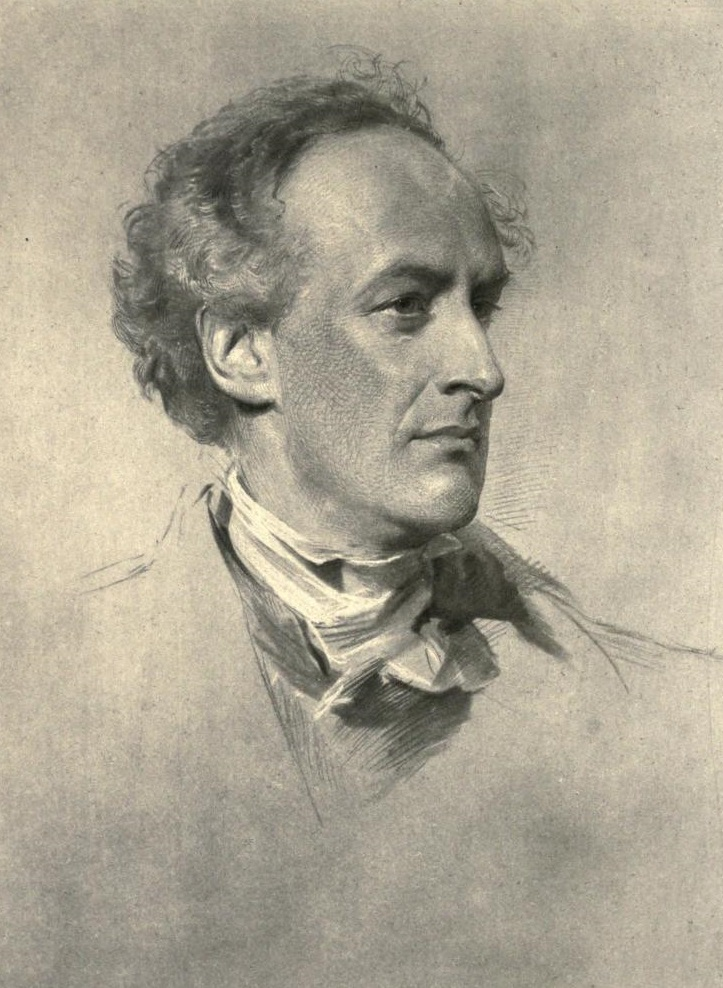
Henry Liddell, in an 1858 portrait by George Richmond

Henry George Liddell (/ˈlɪdəl/; (Note: Naiditch quotes "a variant of the Balliol Rhymes: 'I am the Dean, and this is Mrs Liddell: / She plays the first, and I the second fiddle.'") 6 February 1811 – 18 January 1898) was dean (1855–1891) of Christ Church, Oxford, Vice-Chancellor of Oxford University (1870–1874), headmaster (1846–1855) of Westminster School (where a house is now named after him), author of A History of Rome (1855), and co-author (with Robert Scott) of the monumental work A Greek–English Lexicon, known as "Liddell and Scott", which is still widely used by students of Greek. Lewis Carroll wrote Alice's Adventures in Wonderland for Henry Liddell's daughter Alice.

== Life ==
Henry Liddell was the son of The Rev. Henry Liddell (1787-1809) and Charlotte Lyon, who was the daughter of Thomas Lyon and granddaughter of Thomas Lyon, 8th Earl of Strathmore and Kinghorne. Through his mother, he would be first cousins, three times removed from Queen Elizabeth the Queen Mother.

Liddell received his education at Charterhouse and Christ Church, Oxford. He gained a double first degree in 1833, then became a college tutor, and was ordained in 1838.

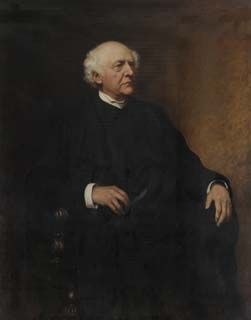
Henry Liddell, in an 1891 portrait by Sir Hubert von Herkomer

Liddell was Headmaster of Westminster School from 1846 to 1855. Meanwhile, his life work, the great lexicon (based on the German work of Franz Passow), which he and Robert Scott began as early as 1834, had made good progress, and the first edition of Liddell and Scott's Lexicon appeared in 1843. It immediately became the standard Greek–English dictionary, with the 8th edition published in 1897.

As Headmaster of Westminster Liddell enjoyed a period of great success, followed by trouble due to the outbreak of fever and cholera in the school. In 1855 he accepted the deanery of Christ Church, Oxford. In the same year he brought out his History of Ancient Rome and took a very active part in the first Oxford University Commission. His tall figure, fine presence and aristocratic mien were for many years associated with all that was characteristic of Oxford life. Coming just at the transition period when the "old Christ Church," which Pusey strove so hard to preserve, was inevitably becoming broader and more liberal, it was chiefly due to Liddell that necessary changes were effected with the minimum of friction.

In 1859 Liddell welcomed the then Prince of Wales when he matriculated at Christ Church, being the first royal holder of that title who had matriculated since Henry V. While Liddell was Dean of Christ Church, he arranged for the building of a new choir school and classrooms for the staff and pupils of Christ Church Cathedral School on its present site. Before then the school was housed within Christ Church itself.

In conjunction with Sir Henry Acland, Liddell did much to encourage the study of art at Oxford, and his taste and judgment gained him the admiration and friendship of Ruskin. In 1891, owing to advancing years, he resigned the deanery. The last years of his life were spent at Ascot, where he died on 18 January 1898. Two roads in Ascot, Liddell Way and Carroll Crescent honour the relationship between Henry Liddell and Lewis Carroll.

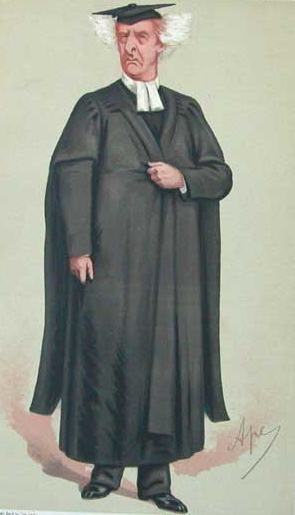
Liddell as caricatured by 'Ape' in Vanity Fair (1875)

Liddell was an Oxford "character" in later years. He figures in contemporary undergraduate doggerel:

I am the Dean, this is Mrs Liddell.
She plays first, I, second fiddle.
She is the Broad,
I am the High –

We are the University.

The Victorian journalist, George W. E. Russell (1853–1919), conveys something of Liddell's image:

The Vice-Chancellor who matriculated me [1872] was the majestic Liddell, who, with his six feet of stately height draped in scarlet, his 'argent aureole' of white hair, and his three silver maces borne before him, always helped me to understand what Sydney Smith meant when he said, of some nonsensical proposition, that no power on earth, save and except the Dean of Christ Church, should induce him to believe it.

== Works ==
Henry George Liddell was the author of

- A Greek-English Dictionary Based on the German Work of Francis Passow, Oxford: Oxford University Press, 1843, and numerous editions of the same, including abridgments for student use, written with Robert Scott.
- A History of Rome from the Earliest Times to the Establishment of the Empire, vol. I & II, London: John Murray, 1855
- Life of Julius Caesar, New York: Sheldon & Co., 1860, excerpted from the Roman history.
- The Student's Rome: A History of Rome from the Earliest Times to the Establishment of the Empire, London: John Murray, 1865, excerpted from the Roman history and revised.

== Family ==
His father was Henry Liddell, Rector of Easington (1787–1872), the younger son of Sir Henry Liddell, 5th Baronet (1749–1791) and the former Elizabeth Steele. His father's elder brother, Sir Thomas Liddell, 6th Baronet (1775–1855), was raised to the Peerage as Baron Ravensworth in 1821.

His mother was the former Charlotte Lyon (1785–1871), a daughter of Thomas Lyon (1741–1796) (who was the youngest son of the 8th Earl of Strathmore and Kinghorne) and the former Mary Wren (died 1811).

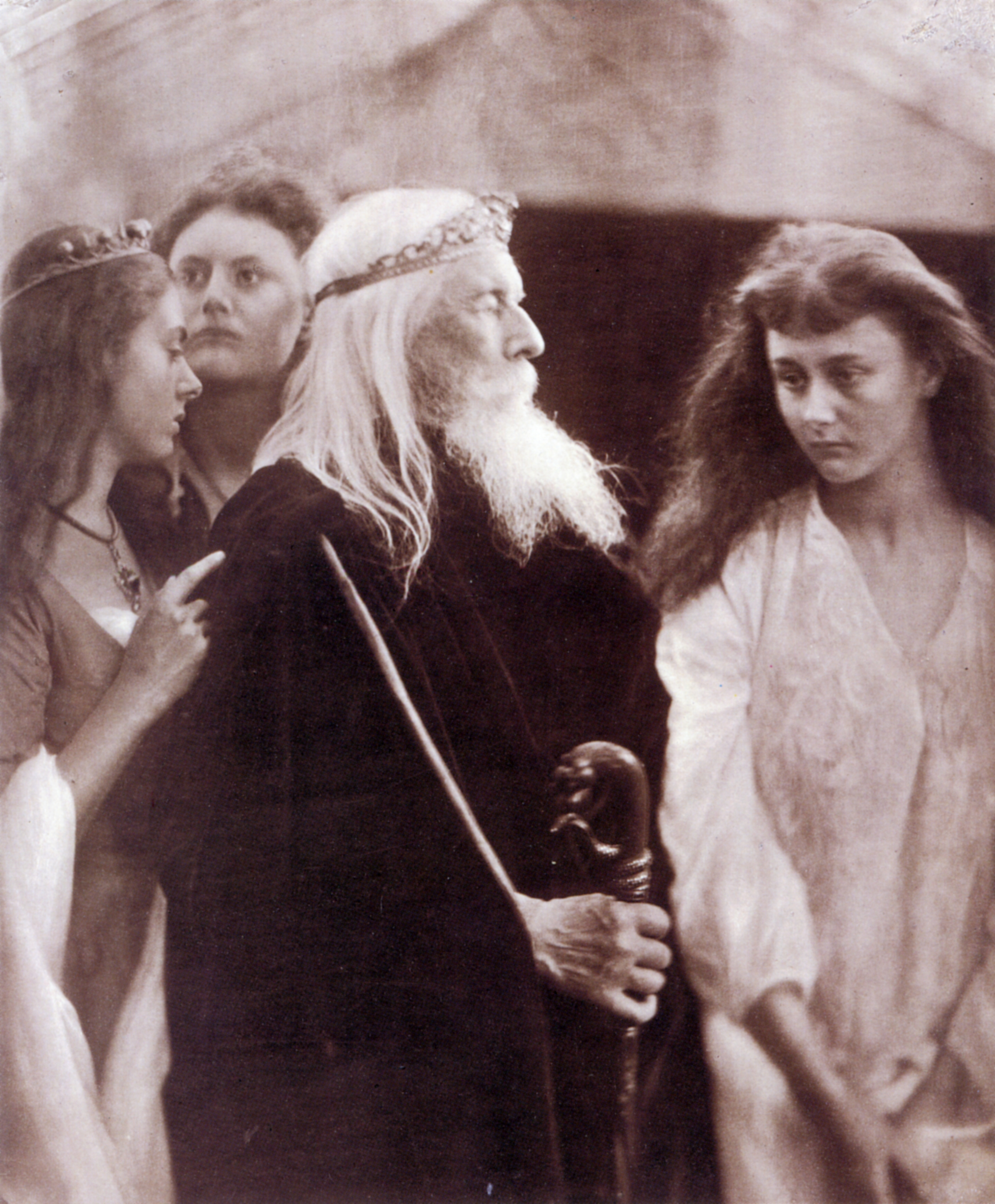
Three of Liddell's children (l to r) Lorina, Edith and Alice, photographed by Julia Margaret Cameron in 1872. The central figure is Charles Hay Cameron as King Lear.

On 2 July 1846, Henry married Lorina Reeve (3 March 1826 – 25 June 1910). They were parents of ten children:

- Edward Henry Liddell – also known as Harry (6 September 1847 – 14 June 1911).
- Lorina Charlotte 'Ina' Liddell (11 May 1849 – 29 October 1930); married William Baillie Skene in 1874.
- James Arthur Charles Liddell (28 December 1850 – 27 November 1853).
- Alice Pleasance Liddell (4 May 1852 – 16 November 1934), who was the inspiration for the children's book Alice's Adventures in Wonderland. She married Reginald Gervis Hargreaves, a former student from Christ Church and an English cricketer, had three sons with two being killed in World War I.
- Edith Mary Liddell (Spring, 1854 – 26 June 1876).
- Rhoda Caroline Anne Liddell (1859 – 19 May 1949); she was appointed a Member of the Order of the British Empire (MBE) in 1920 for her orthopaedic work at Netley Red Cross Hospital.
- Albert Edward Arthur Liddell (1863 – 28 May 1863); he died in infancy.
- Violet Constance Liddell (10 March 1864 – 9 December 1927); like her sister appointed MBE in 1920 for orthopaedic work at Netley.
- Sir Frederick Francis Liddell (7 June 1865 – 19 March 1950): First Parliamentary Counsel and Ecclesiastical Commissioner. His son, Maurice Arthur Liddell, married Alix Kerr OBE (May 1907 – 6 July 1981), British writer who contributed to the Guiding and Girl Scouting.
- Lionel Charles Liddell (22 May 1868 – 21 March 1942); he was British Consul to Lyon and Copenhagen.

== Notes ==
Academic offices
Preceded by Thomas Gaisford	Dean of Christ Church, Oxford; 1855–1891	Succeeded by Francis Paget
Preceded by Francis Knyvett Leighton	Vice-Chancellor of Oxford University; 1870–1874	Succeeded by James Edwards Sewell
