= Nine Mile Point railway station =

Former railway station in Wales

Coordinates: 51.6127°N 3.1510°W

Nine Mile Point

General information
- Location: Wales
- Platforms: 2

Other information
- Status: Disused

History
- Original company: Sirhowy Railway
- Pre-grouping: London and North Western Railway
- Post-grouping: London, Midland and Scottish Railway

Key dates
- 1869: Station opened
- 2 February 1959: Station closed
Location

Nine Mile Point railway station was a halt on the Newport to Tredegar line of the Sirhowy Railway. It served the village of Wattsville. It marked the position of the end on junction between the Sirhowy and Monmouthshire tramroads, being nine miles from the end of the Monmouthshire section of the tramroad at Llanarth St, Newport. Marshalling yards to the north were for the Nine Mile Point Colliery. Nine Mile Point had two signal boxes, No 1 & 2 within short distance of each other. This was due to the very narrow valley allowing just an up and down line. Traffic between the marshalling yards and the colliery was considerable needing the use of two signal boxes. Little remains of this site other than a water tower foundations and evidence of a platform. At its peak there were 11 daily services between Nine Mile point and Newport or Tredegar.
