= Hengoed Viaduct =

Multi-arched railway viaduct over a river

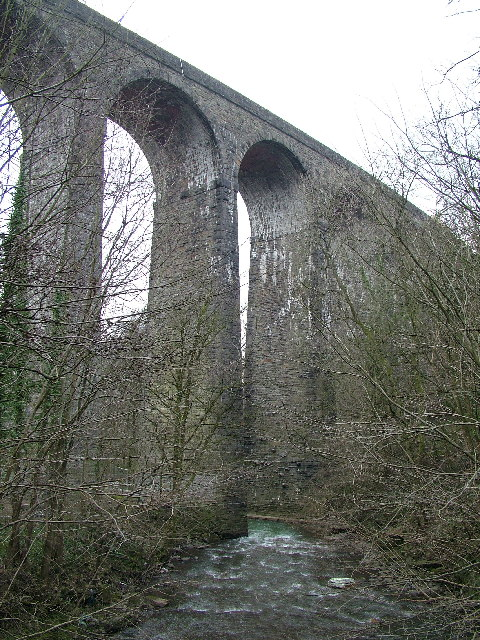
- Coordinates: 51°38′44.53″N 3°13′25.65″W
- Carries: Taff Vale Extension; National Cycle Route 47
- Crosses: Rhymney River
- Locale: Maesycwmmer, Caerphilly, South Wales
- Other name(s): Maesycwmmer Viaduct; Rhymney Viaduct
- Owner: Newport, Abergavenny and Hereford Railway; Great Western Railway; British Railways; Railway Paths
- Heritage status: Reopened: 2000; Grade II* listed
- Preceded by: Crumlin Viaduct
- Followed by: Quakers Yard; Taff Vale Railway

Characteristics
- Design: Thomas W. Kennard
- Material: Stone
- Total length: 284 yards (260 m)
- Height: 120 feet (37 m)
- No. of spans: 16

History
- Architect: Charles Liddell
- Designer: Thomas W. Kennard
- Engineering design by: Thomas W. Kennard
- Constructed by: Messrs Rennie and Logan
- Construction start: 1853
- Construction end: 1854
- Construction cost: £20,000
- Opened: 1854
- Inaugurated: 1854
- Closed: 1964

Hengoed Viaduct is a disused railway viaduct located above the village of Maesycwmmer, in Caerphilly county borough, South Wales. Grade II* listed, it was originally built to carry the Taff Vale Extension of the Newport, Abergavenny and Hereford Railway (NA&HR) across the Rhymney River, and is now part of National Cycle Route 47.

== Background ==
During the Industrial Revolution and mass-extraction of coal from South Wales, there was a resultant growth in construction of railways into the South Wales Coalfield. The Taff Vale Railway monopolised the trade of shipping coal to Cardiff Docks, so mine owners were desperate for a competitor-railway to improve speeds of shipping, provide access to new markets, and hence reduce shipping rates.

The London and North Western Railway had developed a route for the industrialised West Midlands and Northwest England, by controlling the Llanfihangel Railway and the Grosmont Railways as feeder lines into the Hereford Railway, and hence onwards via the joint GWR/LNWR controlled Shrewsbury and Hereford Railway. This allowed shipment of goods from Pontypool and the Ebbw Valley to Hereford. However, access to the productive Rhymney Valley and Rhondda Valley coalfields was at best restricted, through having to route trains south to Cardiff along the TVR, then along the South Wales Railway to Newport via the GWR, before being able to access LNWR-controlled track.

The UK Parliament approved an Act of Parliament on 3 August 1846 enabling the construction of the Taff Vale Extension, which would connect Coedygric North Junction at Pontypool with the TVR/GWR at Quakers Yard, allowing direct and LNWR-controlled access. The LNWR approved the required capital expenditure, and merged the existing three railways and the extension project in the new Newport, Abergavenny and Hereford Railway.

== Construction ==
The route for the Taff Vale Extension required the construction of two significant viaducts across two major river valleys: one across the Ebbw River (the Crumlin Viaduct), and one 4 miles (6.4 km) further west across the Rhymney River, the Hengoed Viaduct.

This would be the last major project for the NA&HR to complete the Taff Vale Extension before the line was opened in 1858. Charles Liddell, the chief engineer of the NA&HR, decided that while a stone bridge would be impractical at Crumlin due to the narrow valley sides and hence high winds, at Maesycwmmer all of the natural resources existed to build an effective stone viaduct.

Having won the contract to design and provide the structure of the wrought-iron bridge at Crumlin, Thomas W. Kennard, a Scottish civil engineer, won the contract to design the Hengoed Viaduct. Apart from spanning the Rhymney river, the viaduct also had to span the Brecon and Merthyr Railway's station on the south side, and curve slightly across the valley, to initially form a junction with the B&MR on its northern side, before entering the Bryn Tunnel (398 yards [364 m]).

With a stipulated completion date of 1 October 1854, Liddell engaged contractors Messrs Rennie and Logan, who began work on the masonry structure in mid-1853. Maesycwmmer was a quiet rural farming valley before 1846, but the first project of Messrs Rennie and Logan was to construct both a quarry, from which to extract stone to build the viaduct, and also a complete housing and social complex for workers and their families. The houses remain along the present main road, while the now-disused quarry lies in a field behind the houses of St Anne's Gardens.

Liddell's design consisted of 16 arches, with the first effectively a separate bridge skewed across the low level B&MR, to allow for crossing their Hengoed railway station. With a maximum height above the valley bottom of 120 feet (37 m) and a full length of 284 yards (260 m), construction came at a cost of £20,000 (equivalent to £1,430,400 in 2003), with one fatal accident.

== Operations ==
The line opened as a double track as agreed in 1858. Integrated as part of the Great Western Railway by the 1863 amalgamation of the West Midland Railway with that company, in 1928 the entire length of the Taff Vale Extension was downscaled to a single track.

Through passenger and goods traffic ceased over the viaduct on 15 June 1964, and the line was completely closed and the track lifted later that year as part of the Beeching cuts. After the closure, Hengoed viaduct was offered for sale at a nominal sum of £1.

== Today ==
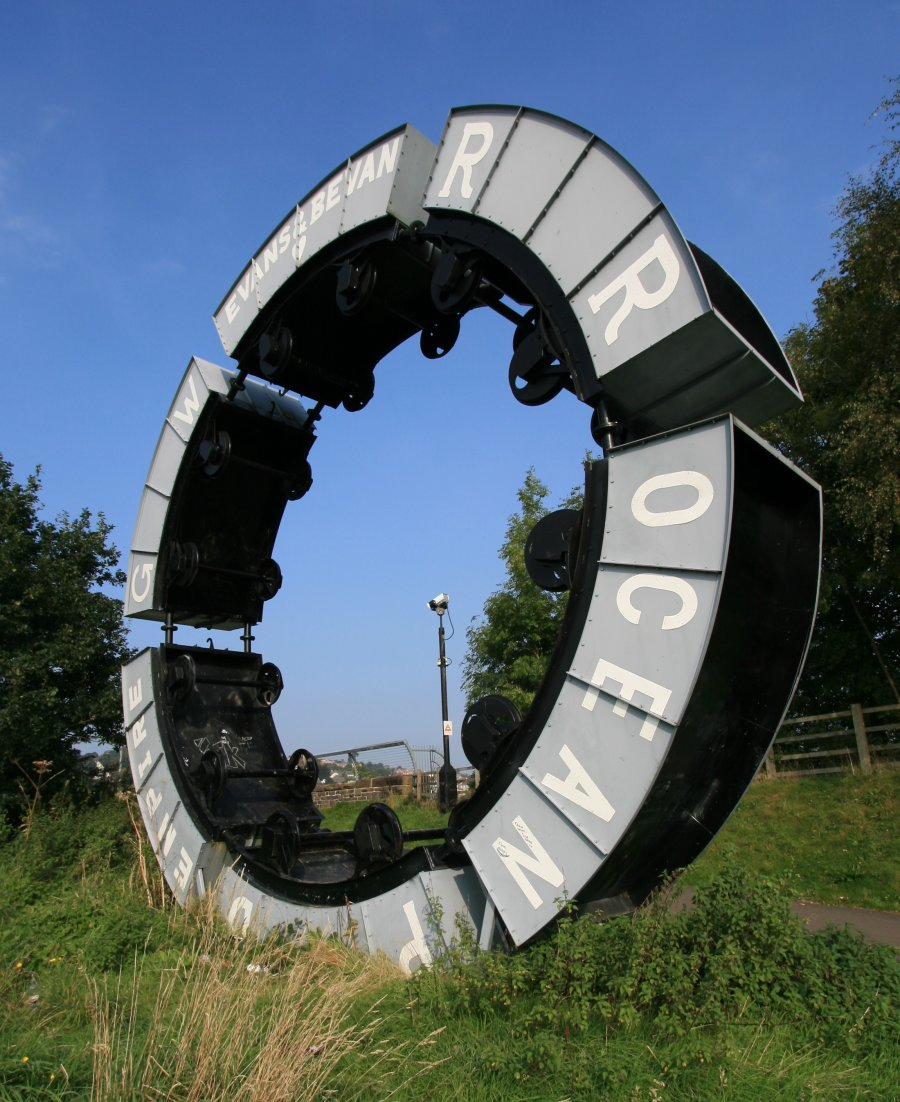
Wheel O Drams

Inaccessible to the public for over 35 years, it was agreed for the viaduct to become part of the National Cycle Network. Integrated as part of the Celtic Trail within National Cycle Route 47, which provides a (mostly) traffic free cycle route from Quakers Yard to Newport, its ownership was transferred from British Rail to Railway Paths Ltd in 1999. Hengoed Viaduct was opened for public access in 2000.

In April 2004, the Heritage Lottery Fund gave Caerphilly borough council a grant of £870,000. This allowed a programme of refurbishment to take place, including repairing and repointing to the pier bases, parapets and arches; as well as repairs to the remains of Hengoed ‘High Level’ Station at the western end of the viaduct. Works have improved public access and safety, with new fencing, viewing platforms and the installation of lighting. Finally, the site and route was enhanced by the "Wheel o Drams" (locally known as "The Stargate") a raised sculpture by Andy Hazell, formed from a circle of coalmining dram trucks to commemorate the industrial heritage of this locality within the history of the South Wales Valleys.

== See also ==
- List of bridges in Wales
