= Crumlin railway station (Wales) =

Disused railway stations in Crumlin, Caerphilly

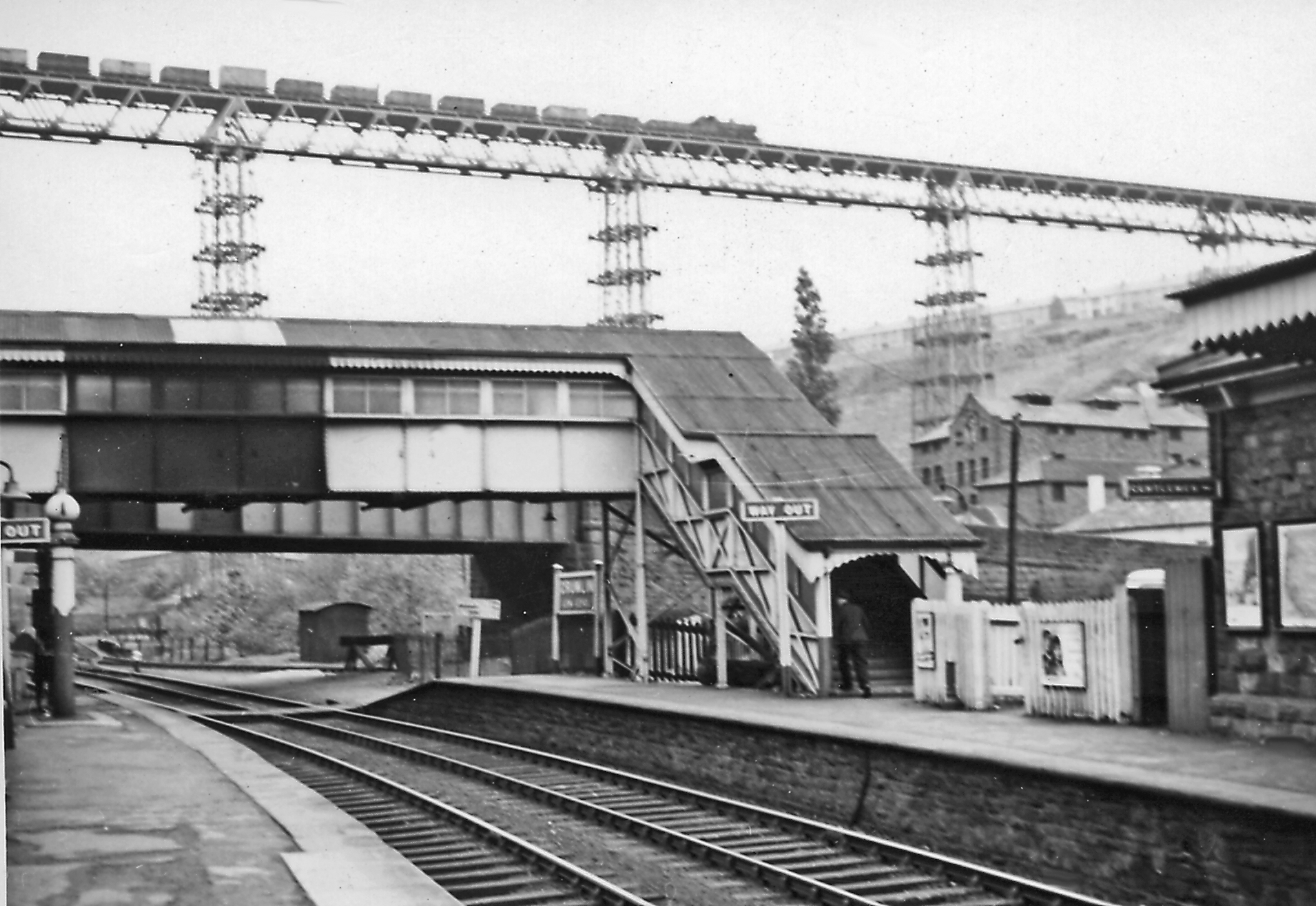
Crumlin (Low Level) station in 1957

The Crumlin railway stations historically served the town of Crumlin, South Wales. Both stations are now closed and no longer exist.

== History ==
=== Crumlin High Level ===
51.6762°N 3.1442°W Crumlin High Level was located to the western bank of the famous Crumlin Viaduct on the Taff Vale Extension of the Newport, Abergavenny and Hereford Railway. It was opened on 8 October 1857 and closed on 15 June 1964.

=== Crumlin Low Level ===
51.6773°N 3.1394°W This station opened as Crumlin on 21 December 1850. It was sited in the Ebbw Valley in the town centre. It was the joining point of the Beaufort Ironworks Tramway running to Ebbw Vale in the north, and the Monmouthshire Canal Tramway running to Newport in the south. It was renamed Crumlin Low Level on 1 September 1881 and closed on 30 April 1962.In 2008 the low-level line running through Crumlin resumed passenger services as the Ebbw Valley Railway, with the nearest access being at Newbridge railway station.
