= Pontypool Clarence Street railway station =

Former railway station in Wales

Pontypool Clarence Street

General information
- Location: Pontypool, Torfaen; Wales
- Coordinates: 51.6983°N 3.0362°W
- Platforms: 2

Other information
- Status: Disused

History
- Original company: Newport, Abergavenny and Hereford Railway
- Pre-grouping: Great Western Railway

Key dates
- 20 August 1855: Station opened
- 15 June 1964: Station closed
Location

Pontypool Clarence Street railway station was a station on the former Taff Vale Extension (TVE) of the Newport, Abergavenny and Hereford Railway. The station opened 20 August 1855 to link up with the Taff Vale Railway (TVR) at Quakers Yard which connected onto Merthyr Tydfil. A major achievement of this railway was the building of the Crumlin Viaduct over the Ebbw River. The TVE linked directly with the Vale of Neath Railway at Merthyr and further linked Pontypool to Swansea and Neath. The main purpose of this line was the transport of coal across the country.

The goods station closed in 1901. The goods shed is now part of Robert Price's yard.

Passenger services on the TVE ceased on 15 June 1964 though coal traffic continued. The site of Clarence Street station is now the A472 dual carriageway road.

Preceding station	Disused railways	Following station
Crumlin Valley Colliery Platform	Great Western Railway; Newport, Abergavenny and Hereford Railway	Pontypool Road
