= Newport, Abergavenny and Hereford Railway =

Welsh transport company

The Newport, Abergavenny and Hereford Railway was a railway company formed to connect the places in its name. When it sought parliamentary authorisation, it was denied the southern section, and obliged to use the Monmouthshire Railway between Pontypool and Newport.

It opened on 6 December 1853, and was part of an important chain of lines between south-east Wales and Birkenhead; mineral traffic in both directions was dominant. The London and North Western Railway hoped to exploit the line to form a network in South Wales, but that aspiration was not fully realised, and in 1860 the NA&HR merged with other railways to form the West Midland Railway, which soon amalgamated with the Great Western Railway in 1863.

In order better to serve the ironworks in the South Wales Valleys, the NA&HR built the Taff Vale Extension Line, running west from Pontypool and cutting across several of the valleys, making connections with other companies' lines, eventually at twelve locations. The line was opened in stages from 1857, and included the Crumlin Viaduct crossing the valley of the Ebbw River.

After 1945 local passenger and goods business collapsed, and somewhat later the mineral industries declined too. By 1979 only the Pontypool to Hereford main line, and some short stubs of the Taff Vale Extension Line remained in use, but the main line flourished, and continues in use as an important secondary main line.

== Authorisation ==
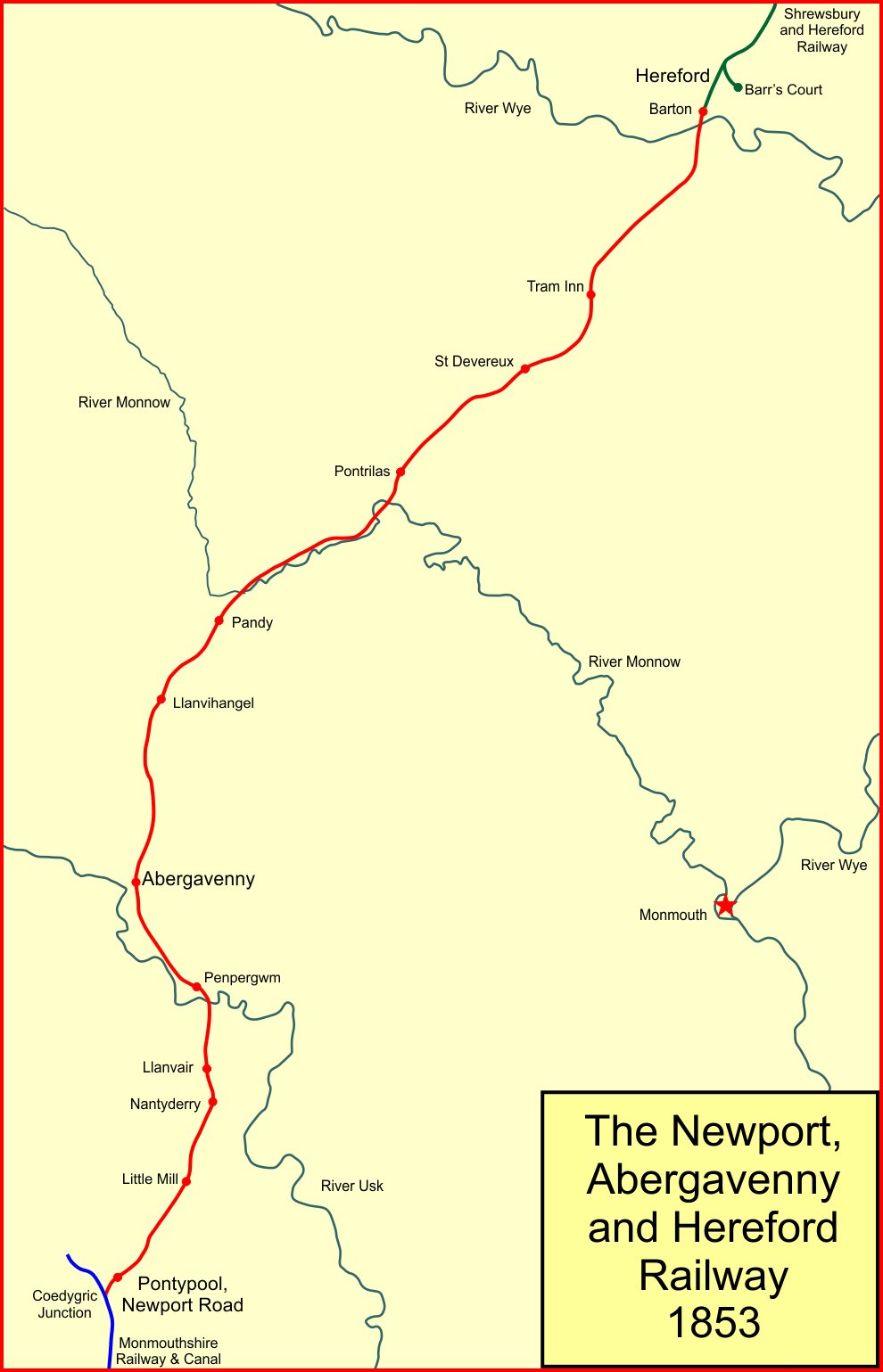
System map of the Newport, Abergavenny and Hereford Railway in 1858

In the first half of the 1840s a scheme was conceived to link the industrial centres of the West Midlands directly with the metal industries of South Wales. The idea became the Welsh Midland Railway, and it would have run from Worcester via Hereford and Brecon to join the Taff Vale Railway. However the financial chaos following the Railway Mania resulted in that scheme being dropped.

Newport, Abergavenny and Hereford Railway Act 1846
- Act of Parliament
- Parliament of the United Kingdom
- Long title: An Act for making a Railway from Newport to Abergavenny and Hereford, with Branches therefrom.
- Citation: 9 & 10 Vict. c. ccciii

Dates
- Royal assent: 3 August 1846

It was revived as a more modest scheme, and the Newport, Abergavenny and Hereford Railway was incorporated on 3 August 1846. It had been proposed to build the line to Newport, but the Monmouthshire Railway and Canal Company had been authorised in 1845 to build its Newport and Pontypool line, and Parliament declined to authorise a duplicate route. Instead the Newport, Abergavenny and Hereford Railway Act 1846 (9 & 10 Vict. c. ccciii) authorised it to build from a junction with the intended Newport and Pontypool Railway in the parish of Llanvrechva to Hereford. It was to take over and use the alignments of three earlier tramroads: the Llanvihangel, Grosmont and Hereford Railways. Their acquisition was strategic, in order to obtain the right of way, and very little use was made of the tramroads themselves by the NA&HR.

Newport, Abergavenny and Hereford Railway (Deviations) Act 1847
- Act of Parliament
- Parliament of the United Kingdom
- Long title: An Act for amending the Newport, Abergavenny, and Hereford Railway Act, 1846, and to authorize Deviations from the Line of the said Railway, and for making Branches and Extensions therefrom.
- Citation: 10 & 11 Vict. c. lxxxvi

Dates
- Royal assent: 2 July 1847

Text of statute as originally enacted

Newport, Abergavenny and Hereford Railway (Extension to Taff Vale Railway) Act 1847
- Act of Parliament
- Parliament of the United Kingdom
- Long title: An Act to enable the Newport, Abergavenny, and Hereford Railway Company to extend their Railway from the Neighbourhood of Pontipool to the Taff Vale Railway.
- Citation: 10 & 11 Vict. c. clxxvii

Dates
- Royal assent: 9 July 1847

Text of statute as originally enacted

A further act of Parliament, the Newport, Abergavenny and Hereford Railway (Deviations) Act 1847 (10 & 11 Vict. c. lxxxvi), was passed the following year authorising minor changes to the route, and a junction with the Shrewsbury and Hereford Railway. The timing of the 1846 authorisation was unfortunate, as the continuing financial crisis at the time made it impossible to raise money for railway schemes, and for some years no attempt was made to start building the line. Nevertheless, in 1847 the company also applied, and secured, authorisation in the Newport, Abergavenny and Hereford Railway (Extension to Taff Vale Railway) Act 1847 (10 & 11 Vict. c. clxxvii) for the Taff Vale Extension line, from Llanvrechva to a junction with the Taff Vale Railway near Quakers Yard, requiring a further £400,000 of capital.

== Construction ==
The financial crisis resulted in complete inaction on the ground, and the Company sought postponement of the acquisition of the three tramways. In 1851 the London and North Western Railway feared that the GWR and its broad gauge allies were attempting to monopolise South Wales, and the LNWR itself took an interest in reaching South Wales; the NA&HR would be a key link in the chain for that purpose. In partnership with the Midland Railway the LNWR suggested generous terms to the NA&HR in completing and working their line. Negotiations dragged on with opposition from some LNWR directors, but the NA&HR were offered 4% on their capital outlay, but only when the Worcester and Hereford Railway was opened. This agreement was finalised on 19 February 1852 and included LNWR directors taking 8% of the NA&HR share issue.

In May 1851 the engineer Charles Liddell had been appointed to supervise the construction, and by March 1852 construction work was in progress on the ground. A working agreement with the LNWR was agreed, to come into effect when the Worcester and Hereford Railway was opened: at this stage its authorising Bill was in Parliament.

The mineral traffic potential was hugely dominant: two sets of carriages would be enough for the passenger service, but the LNWR estimated that 1,000 wagons would be required. The Cunard shipping line alone had indicated a requirement for steam coal of 100,000 tons annually at Birkenhead and 300,000 at Liverpool . (In fact about a third of that number were in use in 1854.)

In 1853 the NA&HR sought parliamentary approval for leasing its line to the LNWR, and for extensions of its network to Swansea and Brecon; at the time Parliament was against large scale amalgamations, and these measures were rejected.

== Opening ==
Construction of the planned Newport and Pontypool Railway had not made much progress, but it had resumed under a fresh authorising act of Parliament, the Newport and Pontypool Railway Amendment Act 1848 (11 & 12 Vict. c. cxx); it was built by the Monmouthshire Railway and Canal Company, and it was opened on 30 June 1852. The Newport, Abergavenny and Hereford Railway was opened to goods trains on 30 July 1852, and the formal opening to passengers took place on 6 December 1853, but a slip at Llanvihangel caused the Board of Trade inspecting officer, Captain Wynne, to refuse opening for passenger traffic, and public service was not started until 2 January 1854. The Shrewsbury and Hereford Railway had opened on 6 December 1853.

The permanent way consisted of a double track of Barlow rails throughout the main line, Coedygric Junction to the Barton station at Hereford. It was standard gauge.

Services reached Newport Mill Street station over the Monmouthshire Railway, which had opened in 1852; its line was single at first, but it was doubled in April 1854. The two networks joined at Coedygric Junction, near Pontypool. The NA&HR had no statutory running powers over the NA&HR; the arrangement was by mutual agreement. The Hereford station was later known as Hereford (Barton). By a northward extension a mile in length (Note: The mile extension was actually the property of the Worcester and Hereford Railway, but it was constructed by the NA&HR as agents for them.) a junction was made at Barrs Court Junction with the Shrewsbury and Hereford Railway; this single line was opened to passenger trains on 16 January 1854, completing a continuous railway from the River Dee to the Bristol Channel.

The NA&HR was worked from the outset by the London and North Western Railway.

== Taff Vale Extension Railway ==
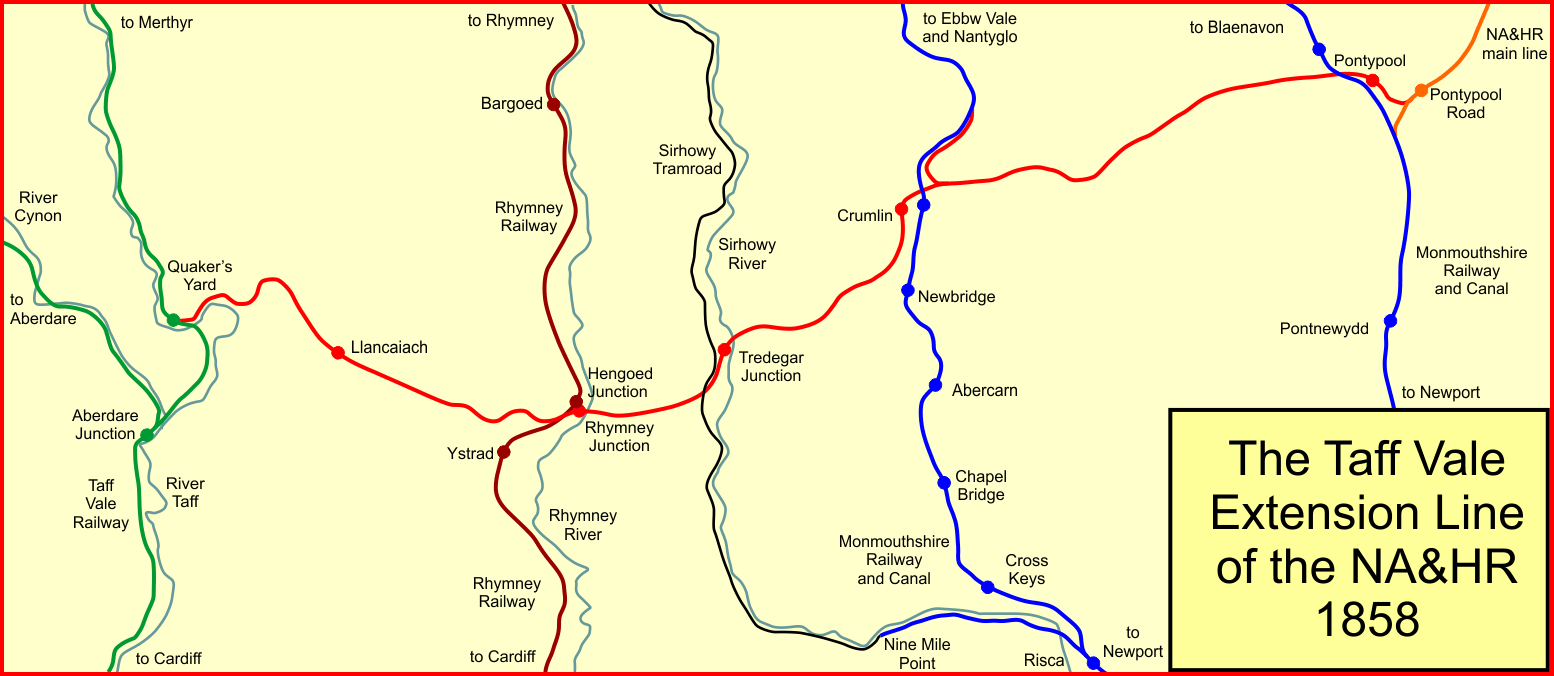
The Taff Vale Extension line in 1858

The attraction of South Wales as a considerable centre of the metal-working industries was not diminished, and the directors considered it important to make a connection to the district. They obtained powers in the Newport, Abergavenny and Hereford Railway (Extension to Taff Vale Railway) Act 1847 (10 & 11 Vict. c. clxxvii) for the Taff Vale Extension Railway, which was to run from Coedygric North Junction at Pontypool westwards to make a junction with the Taff Vale Railway at Quakers Yard.

The South Wales valleys may be considered to run broadly southwards and many of them were already served by a railway line running to the ports. The Taff Vale Extension line was to run from east to west; this would enable it to connect into many of the valley lines, but as it crossed the grain of the valleys, it would be challenging to construct. In 1853 work was started on the Crumlin Viaduct, stated to be the largest viaduct in the world, (Note: Barrie says, page 61, that it was the third highest structure of its kind in the world, at 208 feet.) crossing the Ebbw Valley at a height of 200 feet, and 1650 feet in length. The first section of the Taff Vale Extension line from Pontypool Road to Crumlin Junction was opened on 20 August 1855. (Note: MacDermot says (volume I part II page 534) "though the sanction of the Board of Trade was not obtained till two months later.") It was a single line of Barlow rails at first, but was doubled soon afterwards. The branch down to Llanhilleth was opened to an NA&HR goods depot there on 3 September 1855 and a connection joining the Monmouthshire Railway's Western Valley line at Llanhilleth opened on 20 October 1855. Crumlin Viaduct was finished in May 1857 and was opened for traffic on 1 June 1857, together with a further three miles of single line to Tredegar Junction (now Pontllanfraith) on the Sirhowy Railway. The Sirhowy Railway had not yet been converted to a standard gauge railway, and it was not until 1865, when this was done, that the junction was used for through running.

The Taff Vale Extension line was opened through to Quakers Yard Low Level Junction, connecting there with the Taff Vale Railway, on 11 January 1858. The final section, on from Quakers Yard to Middle Duffryn Junction, joining the Vale of Neath Railway, was opened on 18 April 1864 for goods trains, and on 5 October 1864 for passenger traffic; this was after the NA&HR had been taken over by the West Midland Railway, and that company had itself amalgamated with the Great Western Railway.

The Taff Vale Extension was immensely important strategically, giving access to South Wales Valley lines and their mineral resources, at twelve junctions in 20 miles.

This took on a particular aspect as Aberdare coal came to be regarded as the best quality coal available, and it was extracted in abundant quantities. Coal trains ran from Aberdare to London and Southampton as well as Liverpool; bunkering ocean-going ships at the latter ports was an important part of the business. After the GWR had acquired both the West Midland Railway and the Vale of Neath Railway, it regarded the route from Aberdare to Pontypool as a single entity, and some writers refer to the whole distance to Pontypool as "the Vale of Neath line". However, Middle Duffryn was the boundary between the Vale of Neath Railway network and the Taff Vale Extension line.

The route was exceptionally congested, and the layout and infrastructure were not adequate for some time for the traffic to be handled.

Some relief was achieved when it was possible to divert eastbound mineral trains over the Sirhowy Railway to Newport via Risca. As well as having more favourable gradients, this route avoided the Crumlin Viaduct, which had a weight restriction preventing the use of the heaviest and most powerful locomotives over it.

== Relations with the LNWR ==
The NA&HR was worked by the LNWR, but that company, led by Mark Huish, often adopted aggressive tactics. In an attempt to seize control of the entire route from Shrewsbury to Newport, the LNWR (through the Birkenhead Railway), refused goods traffic between Birkenhead and Wolverhampton unless taken by way of Stafford, a circuitous route. This disagreement became serious and the NA&HR suspended the working arrangement with the LNWR from 1 October 1854, and brought in the railway contractor Thomas Brassey and Company. The LNWR continued to loan carriages and other rolling stock. Brassey could not bring sufficient engine power to work the line efficiently, and the NA&HR decided to work the line themselves; they did so, effective from 1 January 1855. At the end of March 1855 the LNWR summarily withdrew their rolling stock, and for some time the NA&HR was in considerable difficulty, losing business as a result.

The breakaway from the LNWR led to difficult times for the NA&HR, and it formed an alliance with the Oxford, Worcester and Wolverhampton Railway. The two companies pooled resources to complete a third line, the Worcester and Hereford Railway, then under construction but experiencing difficulties. The OW&WR was undoubtedly the senior partner in this alliance, the NA&HR having relatively limited financial resources. It took powers to subscribe £37,500 to the Worcester and Hereford Railway.

The route from Birkenhead to South Wales became an important trunk line for minerals: MacDermot, drawing on a report of 1856, says that

"a considerable Mineral Traffic, from the interchange of Red [iron] Ore from Birkenhead for the Iron Masters of South Wales with Steam Coals back from that district to the Mersey began. This was worked throughout from Pontypool to Birkenhead by the engines and waggons of the Newport, Abergavenny and Hereford Railway..."

== West Midland Railway ==
In due course it was agreed that amalgamation of the allies was an appropriate move, and the NA&HR, the OW&WR and the still unfinished Worcester and Hereford Railway were amalgamated, forming the West Midland Railway. The amalgamation was ratified by the West Midland Railway Act 1860 (23 & 24 Vict. c. lxxxi) of 1 July 1860. It had been fiercely opposed by the London and North Western Railway and its local line, the Shrewsbury and Hereford Railway, and Parliament gave the LNWR running powers over the NA&HR. In return the West Midland Railway had running powers over the S&HR from Hereford to Shelwick Junction, the point at which the Worcester line joined.

The West Midland Railway itself fell under the influence of the Great Western Railway, and soon consideration took place of amalgamation with the GWR. This took place, and was effective in 1863.

== Coleford, Monmouth, Usk and Pontypool Railway ==
The ironmaster Crawshay Bailey and his business partners were anxious to bring iron ore and other minerals from the Forest of Dean to ironworks at Nantyglo, Dowlais and Ebbw Vale, and the route formerly in use had involved a stiff climb against the load up the Western Valley line. They promoted a new railway that was to run from Coleford, on the edge of the Forest of Dean, to a junction with the NA&HR line at Little Mill, two miles north of Pontypool Road, enabling easy access to the ironworks from the Taff Vale Extension line. The first part of this line, from Usk to Little Mill, opened on 2 June 1856, and was worked by the NA&HR. The line was extended to Monmouth on 12 October 1857, and from that date the CMU&PR worked its own line. It never directly reached Coleford, relying instead on the Monmouth Railway (unconnected with the Monmouthshire Railway) to reach Coleford.

In 1861 the CMU&PR was leased to the West Midland Railway, and when that Company amalgamated with the Great Western Railway in 1863 the lease transferred to the GWR.

== Merthyr, Tredegar and Abergavenny Railway ==
The LNWR had running powers over the Newport, Abergavenny and Hereford Railway, and wished to obtain a convenient access to the ironworks of South Wales; this desire was reciprocated by the ironmasters, and at the same time colliery owners needed a suitable route for their output to travel north. On 1 August 1859 the Merthyr, Tredegar and Abergavenny Railway was authorised by the Merthyr, Tredegar and Abergavenny Railway Act 1859 (22 & 23 Vict. c. lix). During construction in difficult terrain did not go well, and the company ran into financial difficulties. The West Midland Railway entered discussions with a view to leasing it, but the LNWR offered generous terms and concluded a deal—a lease of 1,000 years—on 8 November 1861.

On 29 September 1862, the eastern section of the MT&AR was opened to a south-facing junction at Abergavenny, a short distance north of the NA&HR, now WMR, station. The MT&A had its own passenger station, Abergavenny Brecon Road. In 1863 the WMR constructed passenger platforms on its own main line a little north of the new junction, and some MT&AR trains reached it by reversing at the junction. As the primary purpose of the line was mineral traffic to and from the north-west of England and the West Midlands, it was obvious a northward curve was needed at Abergavenny, and this was provided on 22 June 1870. A new Abergavenny Junction station was provided there—"a purely LNWR station on a GWR line"—and the WMR 1863 station was closed.

LNWR trains started working through to Merthyr on 9 June 1879.

A county lunatic asylum was constructed near the south junction at Abergavenny; in those days coal and stores were customarily brought in by rail and a private siding connection was made from the south curve about 1884.

== Hereford stations ==
The Hereford station of the NA&HR was at Barton, on the west side of the city. The site was cramped, and the entry of Shrewsbury and Hereford line trains caused congestion. When the Hereford, Ross and Gloucester Railway opened on 1 June 1855 it approached the city from the south-east, and it used the Barrs Court station, on the east side of the city. Running between the two stations involved a reversal at a junction north of Hereford. The obvious inconvenience led to complaints, and a resolution was reached in which a connecting curve to the south was provided by the LNWR, enabling trains from Abergavenny to run direct to Barrs Court. The Hereford Loop, as it was called, ran from Red Hill Junction on the Abergavenny route to Rotherwas Junction on the line from Ross. The GWR provided mixed gauge on the section of the Ross route from Rotherwas Junction to Barrs Court. The Hereford Loop opened on 16 July 1866, (Note: Jenkins says goods 23 July 1866 and passengers 30 July 1866.) and for passenger traffic on 1 August 1866, and nearly all long distance trains used it. Accordingly, Barrs Court became the main station for Hereford.

== Caerleon direct line ==
The NA&HR and its partners, now forming the West Midland Railway section of the Great Western Railway, formed part of an increasingly important trunk route between the industrial West Midlands and the north-west of England, and the Newport and Cardiff areas. Reliance on the line of the Monmouthshire Railway resulted in delays and congestion, and in 1874 the Pontypool, Caerleon and Newport Railway was opened: this provided an independent route from Pontypool Road to Maindee Junction, immediately east of Newport High Street station. The new line lay to the east of the Monmouthshire Railway.

== Golden Valley Railway ==
The Golden Valley Railway opened the first part of its line from Pontrilas on the Abergavenny to Hereford line to Dorstone on 1 September 1881

== Hereford Brecon Curve ==
The Hereford, Hay and Brecon Railway had run to an independent station, Moorfields, in Hereford, and from 1869 it fell under the control of the Midland Railway. There was a link to Barton station, used by the Midland Railway trains from Swansea via Brecon. On 2 January 1893 the Brecon Curve was brought into use at Hereford, enabling those trains to get access to Barrs Court station from the north. Barton passenger station had for some time only been used by the Midland trains although the station was owned by the GWR. It was now closed and Barrs Court became the only passenger station at Hereford.

== Pontypool Road ==
Pontypool Road had become an important junction, handling the divergence of the main line to Newport and the Eastern Valley line (the former Monmouthshire Railway line) and the Taff Vale Extension Line, as well as goods sorting sidings and an engine shed. Its gradual growth had led to an inconvenient layout, and the opportunity was taken by the GWR to build a new station, junction, engine shed and sidings facilities; the passenger station consisted of a long island platform. The new layout was opened on 1 March 1908.

== North and West Route ==
From the outset the Newport, Abergavenny and Hereford Railway formed part of a chain of railways connecting the Bristol Channel and the Mersey. As the railway companies involved became oriented to the Great Western Railway, or at least prepared to do business with the GWR, the route became increasingly important, especially for goods and mineral traffic, from Bristol through the Severn Tunnel as well as from South Wales. The route became known as the North and West Route; a significant advantage was that it avoided the exceptionally congested area of the West Midlands.

=== Since 1948 ===
There was a decline in usage of local railway stations from about 1930 as the quality of rural roads improved, and motor lorries and buses became available; inevitably this led to a loss of railway business, and on 9 June 1958, the majority of stations on the NA&HR main line were closed. The Merthyr, Tredegar and Abergavenny line had already closed to through goods trains in 1954 and to passengers on 6 January 1958. This was followed by complete closure of the MT&AR on 5 April 1971.

On 15 June 1964 the passenger service on the Taff Vale Extension route was ended. The line was closed entirely from Hafodyrynys to Panteg Junction on 31 March 1979.

In 1967 the route from Red Hill Junction to Barton was closed. Barton was retained for the time being as a goods depot.

The North and West Route retains its strategic significance, and carries (2017) through passenger services linking North and South Wales, as there is no through route extant within Wales. A short section of the Taff Vale Extension line remains at Nelson.

== Station list ==
Main line
| Location | Opened | Closed | Notes |
|---|---|---|---|
| Hereford Barton | 2 January 1854 | 2 January 1893 | Brecon and Hay services transferred to Barrs Court |
| Red Hill Junction | | | trailing junction from Rotherwas Junction and Barrs Court |
| Tram Inn | 2 January 1854 | 9 June 1958 | |
| St Devereux | 2 January 1854 | 9 June 1958 | |
| Pontrilas | 2 January 1854 | 9 June 1958 | convergence of the Golden Valley Line |
| Pandy | 2 January 1854 | 9 June 1958 | |
| Llanvihangel | 2 January 1854 | 9 June 1958 | |
| Abergavenny Junction | 1 October 1862 | 9 June 1958 | relocated 25 chains north 20 June 1870 |
| Abergavenny | 2 January 1854 | still open | renamed Abergavenny Monmouth Road 1950; renamed back to Abergavenny 1968 |
| Penpergwm | 2 January 1854 | 9 June 1958 | |
| Llanvair | 2 January 1854 | 1 October 1854 | |
| Nantyderry | 2 January 1854 | 9 June 1958 | |
| Little Mill Junction | 2 January 1854 | 30 May 1955 | Reopened on same site as new station at junction with CMU&PR, only served by Monmouth line trains; renamed Little Mill Junction later in 1883 and finally closed in 1955. |
| Pontypool Newport Road | 2 January 1854 | still open | renamed Pontypool Road later in 1854; goods station relocated a quarter-mile north 1 March 1909; renamed Pontypool 1972; renamed Pontypool and New Inn 1994 |
| Coedygric North Junction | | | divergence of Taff Vale Extension line |
| Coedygric Junction | | | convergence with Monmouthshire Railway |

Taff Vale Extension
| Location | Opened | Closed | Notes |
|---|---|---|---|
| Coedygric North Junction | | | above |
| Coedygric West Junction | | | convergence of line from Newport |
| Pontypool | 20 August 1855 | 15 June 1964 | renamed Pontypool Town 1867; renamed Pontypool Clarence Street 1881 |
| Crumlin Valley Colliery Platform | by 1920 | 6 November 1961 | miners' platform |
| Cefn Crib | February 1860 | September 1860 | |
| Hafodyrynys Platform | 1 January 1913 | 15 June 1964 | |
| Crumlin | 20 August 1855 | 25 May 1857 | temporary station pending opening of Crumlin Viaduct |
| NA&HR spur | | | diverged northward to Llanhilleth Junction on Monmouthshire Railway line to Ebbw Vale and Nantyglo |
| Crumlin Viaduct | | | |
| Crumlin High Level | 25 May 1857 | 15 June 1964 | |
| Treowen Halt | 14 March 1927 | 11 July 1960 | |
| Pentwynmawr Platform | 8 February 1926 | 15 June 1964 | |
| Penar Junction | | | Halls Tramway converged from south and diverged northwards to Markham Colliery |
| Penar Junction Halt | 1 January 1913 | 1 January 1916 | |
| Tredegar Junction | 25 May 1857 | 15 June 1964 | renamed Pontllanfraith 1905; renamed Pontllanfraith Low Level 1950 |
| Bird in Hand Junction | | | Sirhowy Railway converged from north but crossed to south first and diverged southward to Nine Mile Point |
| Sirhowy Junction | | | Sirhowy Railway from Nine Mile Point converged from south |
| Maesycwmmer Branch Junction | | | spur to Maesycwmmer Junction on B&MR towards Rhymney diverged northwards |
| Hengoed Viaduct | | | 299 yards |
| Rhymney Junction | 5 January 1858 | 15 June 1964 | renamed Hengoed & Maesycwmmer 1906; renamed Hengoed High Level 1924 |
| Hengoed Ystrad Junction | | | Hengoed Loop diverged southward towards Ystrad (Mynach) |
| Hengoed Loop Junction | | | Rhymney Railway spur from Hengoed Junction converged from north |
| Penalltau Junction | | | Rhymney Railway spur from Ystrad Mynach converged from south |
| Llancaiach | 5 January 1858 | 1 July 1912 | replaced by Nelson & Llancaiach |
| Llancaiach and Bargoed Junction | | | divergence northward of Taff-Bargoed line to Dowlais; convergence from south of Nelson branch |
| Nelson and Llancaiach | 1 July 1912 | 15 June 1964 | |
| Trelewis Halt | 9 July 1934 | 15 June 1964 | 930 Yards north of Taff Bargoed Junction, diverges north for Dowlais |
| Ocean Navigation | | | convergence of Ocean Deep Navigation Branch from north |
| Treharris | 2 June 1890 | 15 June 1964 | |
| Quakers Yard Branch Junction | | | divergence northward of spur to Quakers Yard High Level |
| Quakers Yard | 5 January 1858 | still open | convergence with Taff Vale line; renamed Quakers Yard Low Level 1924; renamed Quakers Yard 1968 |
| Penrhiwceiber | 15 June 1899 | 15 June 1964 | renamed Penrhiwceiber High Level 1924 |
| Mountain Ash | 5 October 1864 | 15 June 1964 | renamed Mountain Ash Cardiff Road 1924 |
| Duffryn Crossing Halt | 12 July 1914 | 2 April 1917 | |
| Middle Duffryn | | | end-on junction with the Vale of Neath Railway |
