= Thomas Lyon (MP) =

Scottish politician

Thomas Lyon (1741-1796), was a Scottish politician who sat in the House of Commons between 1768 and 1778.

Lyon was the third son of Thomas Lyon, 8th Earl of Strathmore and Kinghorne and Jean Nicholson, daughter of James Nicholson of West Rainton, co. Durham. He matriculated at Pembroke College, Cambridge in 1758 and was awarded MA in 1761. He was a Fellow of the university from 1761 to 1763.

Lyon’s father had been MP for Forfar in 1734 which was subsequently held by William Maule. In 1768 the Strathmore family put Lyon forward to take back the seat of Forfar from the Panmure family. Lyon also stood as Member of Parliament for Aberdeen Burghs. After an exhausting struggle Panmure was returned for the Forfar and Lyon for Aberdeen Burghs. As a result, the Strathmore and Panmure families made an agreement to avoid future contests. Lyon was re-elected in MP for Aberdeen Burghs in 1774. He married Mary Elizabeth Wren, daughter of Farren Wren of Binchester, co. Durham on 13 June 1774.

Lyon’s brother John the 9th Earl died in 1776 and Lyon as sole surviving uncle and one of the guardians of the Strathmore children became deeply involved in financial and legal business. He succeeded his mother to the Hetton-le-Hole estate in Durham on 22 April 1778 and vacated his seat at the opening of the autumn session of 1778. Lyon and his son John believed there was good coal under the Hetton estate and carried out prospecting from the 1770s. Lyon died on 13 September 1796.

Parliament of Great Britain
Preceded by Sir John Lindsay	Member of Parliament for Aberdeen Burghs; 1768–1778	Succeeded by Adam Drummond
