= List of tramroads in South Wales =

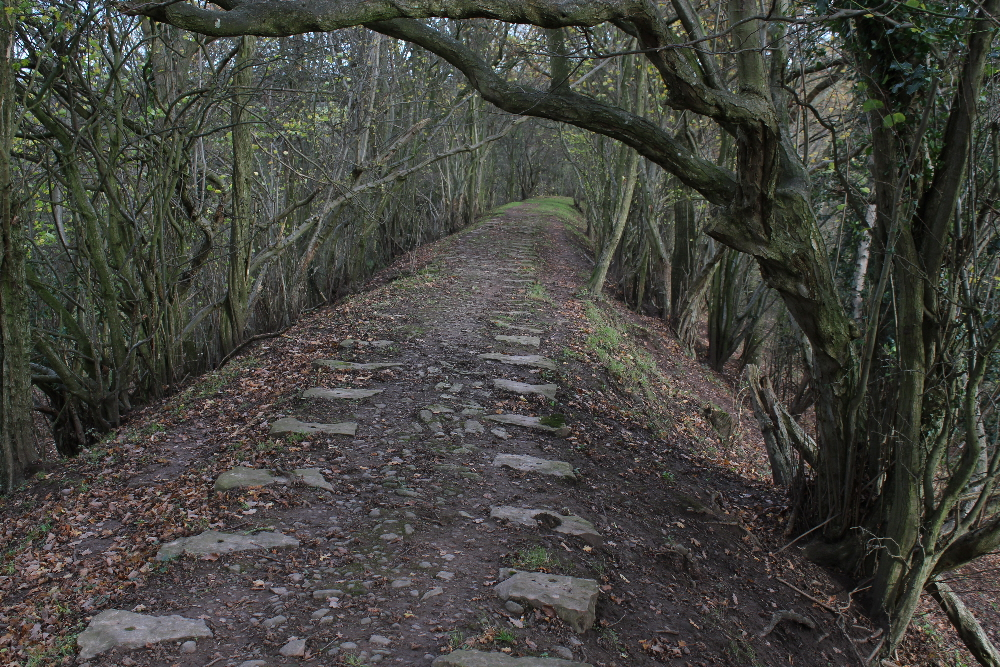
Grosmont Railway embankment at Werngifford, Monmouthshire (SO333212)

Numerous horse-drawn tramroads were constructed in South Wales during the Industrial Revolution, chiefly between the years 1790 and 1830 and connected with the iron and coal-mining industries.

The earliest tramroads were "edge-railways", where the wagons were guided by having flanged wheels running on plain rails, but from around 1800 most tramroads in the area were being made according to the principles of Benjamin Outram, with unflanged wheels running on L-section tracks fixed to stone-block sleepers; and many earlier lines were also rebuilt to these specifications. Track gauges were not standardised, but most were between 3 feet 4 inches and 4 feet 4 inches (1.02–1.32 m).

Overall, the early railways in South Wales covered about 400 miles (644 km), but between the 1840s and the 1860s most of the main lines were replaced by standard-gauge steam railways.

The list of tramroads in South Wales can be split into a number of regions:

== Monmouthshire and Brecon Canal network ==
The canals converging on Newport Docks originally comprised two independent canals: the Monmouthshire Canal between Newport and Pontymoile Basin (as well as the Crumlin Arm, and the Brecknock and Abergavenny Canal between Pontymoile and Brecon.

Numerous tramroads, some built by the canal companies themselves, converged on these canals, as well as forming cross-country routes not directly linked to the Monmouthshire and Brecon Canal network:

Name of Line	Opened	Route	Notes
Aberbeeg Tramroad	1828	Nantyglo and Coalbrookvale Ironworks to Aberbeeg (junction with Beaufort Tramroad)	Rebuilt as a GWR standard-gauge line
Abersychan Limestone Railway	1827	Cwm Lasgarn quarry to the British Ironworks, Abersychan via the Blaenavon Railroad	
Bailey's Tramroad	1821	Nantyglo Ironworks to Govilon canal wharf; later extended to Beaufort Ironworks	
Beaufort Tramroad	1795	Beaufort Ironworks through Brynmawr to Gilwern canal basin, and through Ebbw Vale to Aberbeeg and Crumlin	Became part of the Merthyr, Tredegar and Abergavenny Railway and the Ebbw Valley Railway
Benjamin Hall's Tramroad	1814	Hafod Trislog, Waterloo and Cefn Coch collieries to Abercarn and North Risca (junction with Sirhowy Tramroad)	
Blaenavon Railroad	1796	Blaenavon Ironworks to Pontnewynydd canal terminus	Converted to a railway by the Monmouthshire Railway and Canal Company
Brinore Tramroad	1815	Rhymney Ironworks, Bryn-oer colliery, Trefil quarries to Talybont-on-Usk canal wharf	
Caerleon Tramroad	c.1794	Cwmbran forges to Ponthir tinplate works and Caerleon quay	Line reused by the GWR
Clydach Railroad	1794	Waun-dew colliery, Beaufort to Clydach Ironworks, Gilwern canal wharf and Glangrwney Forge	
Crumlin Tramroad	1826	Crumlin canal basin (connection with Beaufort Tramroad) to Risca (junction with Sirhowy Tramroad)	
Cwm Cuffin Tramroad	c.1810	Blaencuffin Colliery to Crumlin (junction with Beaufort Tramroad)	
Cwm Ffrwd Rail Road	c.1819	Varteg Hill collieries and furnaces to Blaenavon Tramroad at Abersychan	
Darren Disgwylfa tram road	1818	Darren Disgwylfa limestone quarries to Nantyglo Ironworks	
Grosmont Railway	1819	Llanvihangel Crucorney via Grosmont to Monmouth Cap (continued as Hereford Railway to Hereford)	Became part of the Newport, Abergavenny and Hereford Railway
Harford's Tramroad	1835	Sirhowy Iron Works through tunnel to Ebbw Vale furnaces and rolling mills	
Hay Railway	1816	Watton wharf, Brecon to Hay-on-Wye & Eardisley (connection with Kington Tramway)	Line later used by the Hereford, Hay and Brecon Railway
Hill's Tramroad	1818	Blaenavon Ironworks to Garnddyrys forge and Llanfoist canal wharf; branch to Tyla Quarries	
Kington Tramway	1820	Burlingjobb limestone quarries to Kington and Eardisley (connection with Hay Railway)	Line later used by the Kington and Eardisley Railway
Llam-march Tramroad	1795	Llam-march Coal & Mine Works to Clydach Ironworks and Gilwern canal wharf	
Llanarth Tramroad	1824	Rock Colliery, Blackwood to Ynysddu (connection with Penllwyn Tramroad)	
Llanvihangel Railway	1814	Govilon wharf through Abergavenny to Llanvihangel Crucorney (connection with Grosmont Railway)	Became part of the Newport, Abergavenny and Hereford Railway
Llangattock Tramroad	c.1816	Darren Quarries to Llangattock Wharf; later extension to Nantyglo	
Penllwyn Tramroad	1824	Ynysddu (connection with Llanarth Tramroad) to Nine Mile Point (junction with Sirhowy Tramroad)	
Pontypool Tramroad	1829	Pontnewynydd (connection with Blaenavon Railroad) to Pontypool (junction with Trosnant Tramroad)	
Porthmawr Tramroad	by 1800	Porthmawr Colliery to the canal and connection with the Caerleon Tramroad at Cwmbran	
Rassa Railroad	1794	Sirhowy Ironworks to Beaufort Ironworks	
Rumney Railway	1826	Rhymney Ironworks to Bassaleg (junction with Monmouthshire Canal Co. Tramroad)	Conversion to railway completed by the Brecon and Merthyr Railway
Sirhowy Tramroad	1806	Sirhowy Ironworks and Tredegar Ironworks to Nine Mile Point (junction with Monmouthshire Canal Co. Tramroad)	Became part of the Merthyr, Tredegar and Abergavenny Railway
Trevil Rail Road	1797	Trefil limestone quarries to Ebbw Vale via junctions with Rassa Railroad	
Trosnant Tramroad	1796	Trosnant Furnace and Blaendare ironworks to Pontymoile canal wharf	
Watton Plateway	1816	Watton Wharf to Bold's Wharf, Brecon	

== Taff Vale ==
The Taff Vale area encompasses the tramroads associated with the Glamorganshire and Aberdare Canals, which ultimately led to Cardiff Docks:

Name of Line	Opened	Route	Notes
Doctor's Tramroad	1809	Dinas colliery to Treforest and the head of the Doctor's Canal at Glyntaff	
Dowlais Railroad	1791	Dowlais Ironworks to Merthyr canal basin, plus several branches	
Gurnos Tramroad	1792	Gurnos Quarry to Cyfarthfa Ironworks and Merthyr canal wharf	
Hirwaun-Abernant Tramroad (a.k.a. Tappenden's Tramroad)	1805	Hirwaun ponds (Cefn Rhigos tramroad connection) to Abernant Ironworks	Closed in 1900
Llanfabon Tramroad	1810	Gelligaer & Llancaiach Collieries to Abercynon canal basin	
Llwydcoed Tramroad	1811	Aberdare Canal terminus to Llwydcoed (junction with Hirwaun-Abernant Tramoad)	Closed in 1900
Maes-Mawr tramroad		Maes-Mawr collieries to Glamorganshire Canal wharf, Upper Boat	
Merthyr Tramroad (Penydarren Tramroad)	1802	Morlais quarries to Merthyr ironworks & Abercynon canal basin	Superseded by the Taff Vale Railway
Penderyn Tramroad (a.k.a. Mr Glover's Tramroad)	1794	Penderyn limestone quarries to Hirwaun ironworks and Bryngwyn collieries	
Pentyrch tramroad	1815	Pentyrch Iron Works to Melingriffith Tin Plate Works	Converted to a light steam railway in 1871
Sir William Smith's Tramroad (Llanfabon Tramroad)	1810	Nelson to Abercynon canal basin	

== Vale of Neath ==
Served by the Neath and Tennant Canal, which led to Neath and Port Tennant for the Swansea docks:

Name of Line	Opened	Route	Notes
Cefn Rhigos tramroad	1805	Hirwaun Ponds (connection with Hirwaun-Abernant Tramroad) to the Neath Canal, Glynneath	
Crown Copper Works tramway	1809	Dyffryn Clydach Colliery to Crown Copper Works, Skewen	
Dr Bevan's Railway (Dinas Tramroad)	1807	Dinas Limestone Quarry to Pont Walby (junction with Cefn Rhigos tramroad); branch to Glyn Neath Gunpowder Works	
Glyncorrwg Mineral Railway	1840	Blaen Cregan collieries to the Neath Canal basin at Aberdulais	
Melyn Works tramroad	c.1698	Gnoll Colliery to Melyncrythan Pill and copper works	
Resolven tramroads	1837	Cwm-Clydach Colliery & Tyrau Colliery to canal at Resolven	

== Swansea Canal tramroads ==
The Swansea Canal led up the Tawe valley north-east from Swansea:

Name of line	Opened	Route	Notes
Alltwen tramroad		Alltwen collieries to Pontardawe canal arm	
Brecon Forest Tramroad	c.1821	Sennybridge to Penwyllt quarries; extended to Onllwyn Ironworks and Ynysgedwyn Ironworks	
Clyne tramroads		Cwm Blaen Pelenna, Upper Twrch Brook & Lower Twrch Brook to Neath Canal near Clyne	
Cribarth Tramroad	1794	Cribarth quarries to Swansea Canal at Hen Neuadd	
Llansamlet Old Waggonway	1743	Along east bank of River Tawe, Llansamlet	Superseded by Llansamlet Canal
Palleg Railway or Tramroad	1797	Cwm Twrch to Swansea Canal at Ynysgedwyn	
Scott's Railway	1819	Scott's Colliery, Llansamlet to Foxhole wharf on the River Tawe	

== West of Swansea ==
West of Swansea are a number of largely unconnected tramroads, some linked to the Kidwelly and Llanelly Canal:

Name of Line	Opened	Route	Notes
Carmarthenshire Railway	1803	Gorslas to Llanelli basin	Rebuilt as the Llanelly and Mynydd Mawr Railway
Carway tramroad	c.1770	Carway coal pits to Kymer's Canal at Pwll y Llygod for connection to Kidwelly Quay	
Llanelly Railway	1833	St David's Colliery and Gelli Gille Farm to Machynis Pool	Converted to GWR Dafen Branch
Nant Mwrwg tramway	1833	St David's Colliery to Llangennech tin plate works	
New Lodge tramroad		New Lodge Colliery to Burry Port; branch to Cwm Capel	
Oystermouth Railway (Swansea and Mumbles Railway)	1806	Mumbles limestone quarries & Clyne Valley collieries to Swansea	
Penclawdd Canal tramroads	c.1814	Waunarlwydd coal mines and Llewitha Bridge to Penclawdd Canal basin at Ystrad Isaf	
Pencoed tramway		Pencoed Colliery and Genwen Quarry to Machynis	
Pwll tramroad	1826	New Lodge Colliery (connection with New Lodge tramroad) to Pwll Colliery and Llanelly Dock	
Stanley Pit Tramway	1819	New Pit, Pembrey to Pembrey Harbour and Pembrey Canal	
Trimsaran tramroad	c.1815	Trimsaran Colliery to Kidwelly and Llanelli Canal arm at Moat Farm	

== Outlying areas ==
A number of unconnected tramroads in other parts of South Wales:

Name of Line	Opened	Route	Notes
Blorenge Quarries Tramroad	c.1795	Blorenge quarries to Blaenavon Ironworks	Fell out of use in 1804 and plateway track removed by 1813.
Bridgend Railway	1830	Bridgend to Aberkenfig (junction with Duffryn Llynvi and Porthcawl Railway)	Taken over by Llynvi Valley Railway
Bryn Tramway	c.1819	Morfa Newydd to Cwmavon Tinplate Works and Bryn-gyrnos Colliery	
Cwmavon Tramway	c.1824	Pontrhydyfen blast furnace to Cwmavon Works and Aberavon docks	Line later used by the Rhondda and Swansea Bay Railway
Duffryn Llynvi and Porthcawl Railway	1828	Dyffryn to Porthcawl	Converted to the Llynvi Valley Railway
Monmouth Railway	1812	May Hill, Monmouth to Coleford, Gloucestershire. Rebuilt as the Coleford Railway	
Saundersfoot Railway	1829	Thomas Chapel collieries & Stepaside Ironworks to Saundersfoot Harbour	
Taibach waggonway	c.1758	Mynydd Bychan coal mines to Taibach ironworks	
Tondu Brickworks tramroad		Llantwit Colliery to Tondu Brickworks	

== Bibliography ==
- Priestley's Navigable Rivers and Canals, Joseph Priestley 1831
- Coflein: National Monuments Record of Wales database
- old-maps.co.uk
- Bertram Baxter: Stone Blocks and Iron Rails, David & Charles, 1966
- James Gilbert: Railways of England and Wales, E Grattan, 1838
- Charles Hadfield: The Canals of South Wales and the Border, University of Wales Press & Phoenix House, 1960
