= Pen y Clawdd Castle =

Coordinates: 51.8753°N 3.0039°W

Pen y Clawdd Castle is a ditched mound with a double moat, roughly circular in shape, with a diameter of approximately 28m to 30m and about 2.4m high. The castle is in Llanvihangel Crucorney, about five miles to the north of Abergavenny, Monmouthshire, in south east Wales and lies between the Usk and Monnow rivers. The mound was designated a scheduled monument in 1950 and described as a defensive medieval motte.

== Surroundings ==
The castle mound is adjacent to Pen-y-Clawdd Court (a Grade I listed building), a stable and cowshed with adjoining range, and a barn, all of which are Grade II listed buildings. These buildings, along with the castle mound, are set in a roughly rectangular area about 150m by 135m. This area is a possible location for the bailey part of the castle. Some of the features of the mound may have been changed by landscaping around the later buildings.

== History ==
Very little is known of the exact origins of the castle, but it may have been built by Roger de Hastings during the 11th century, as one of a number of forts created after the Revolt of the Earls in 1075. However, no contemporary evidence of occupation of the site exists up to 1349 when, for half a knight's fee, Walter de Kymbard held the site from Laurence de Hastings, 1st Earl of Pembroke, who was also Baron [A]Bergavenny.

The adjacent Pen-y-Clawdd Court was probably built early in the 16th century and extended and remodelled early in the 17th century. The farm buildings were added later; cowshed (early 18th century), barn (mid 18th century), and stable and range (early 19th century).

== Investigation and interpretation ==
The site was surveyed (topographic and geophysical), along with a number of other earthwork sites, between December 1999 and February 2001. Excavations were carried out in 2002 and 2003. The surveys and excavations suggested that there was a large rectangular masonry structure on the mound which suffered fire damage and partly collapsed. The stones may have been used when Pen-y-Clawdd Court was built.

Phillips suggests that the site is a fortified house from a later period, but may have been preceded by a motte and bailey. Phillips notes that the position of the site below a hill is not a usual choice for a motte and bailey and find it "an awkward site to interpret" and "puzzling". Salter classes the motte as a medieval fortified site rather than a castle.
