= Llwyncelyn =

Llwyncelyn is a Welsh place name. It may refer to:

- Llwyncelyn, Ceredigion
- Llwyncelyn, Rhondda Cynon Taf
- Llwyn-celyn Farmhouse, Llanvihangel Crucorney, a Grade I-listed building in Monmouthshire
- Llwyn-celyn farmhouse, Shirenewton, a Grade II-listed building in Monmouthshire
- Llwyn Celyn Fault, a geological fault
- Llwyn y Celyn Wetland, a Site of Special Scientific Interest in Monmouthshire

== See also ==
- Llyn Celyn
