= Pen-y-Clawdd Court =

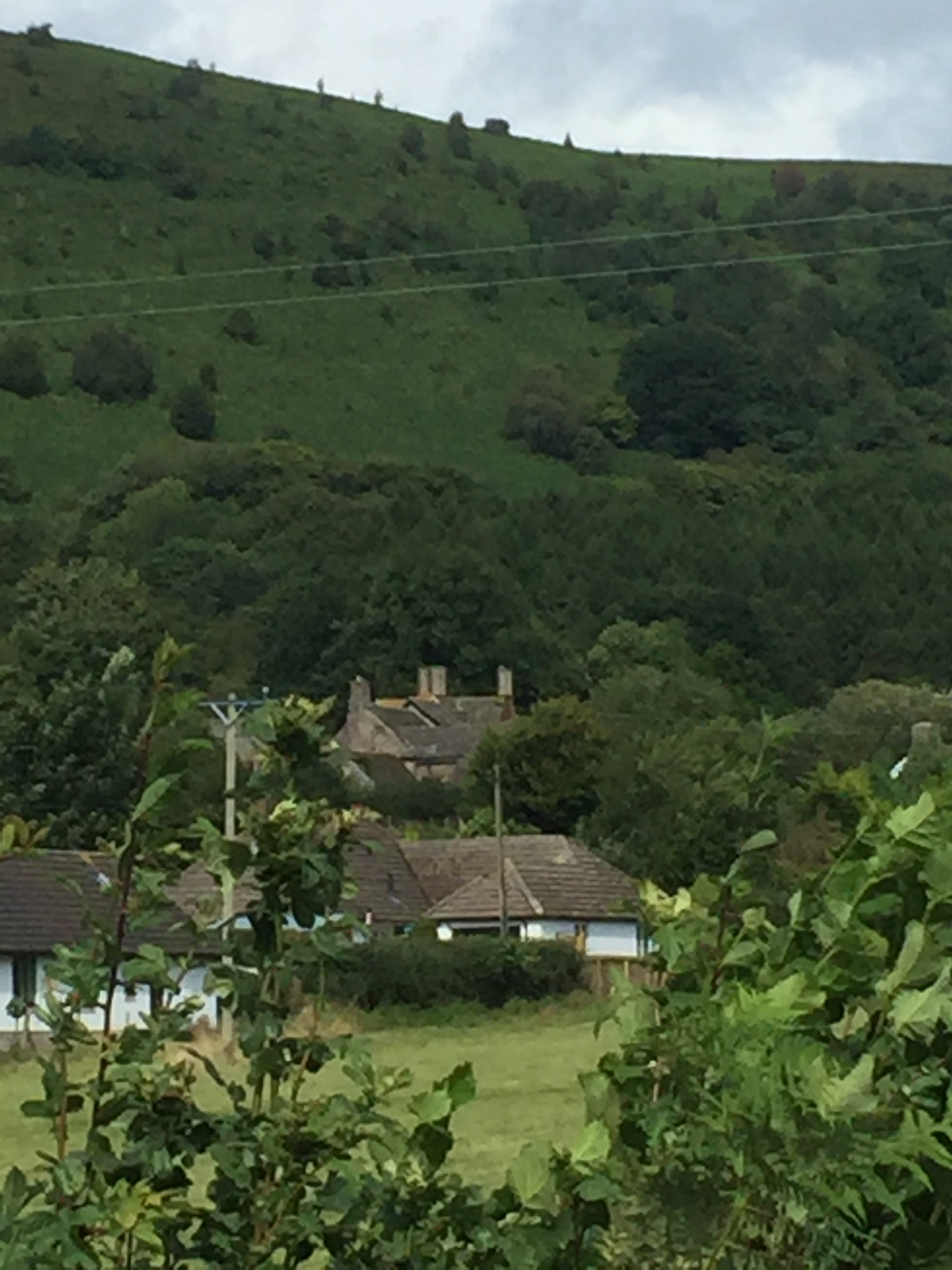
- The chimneystacks and roofs of the Court above the roofline of neighboring houses

- Location within Monmouthshire

General information
- Architectural style: Tudor
- Location: Llanvihangel Crucorney, Wales
- Coordinates: 51.8748°N 3.0020°W
- Construction started: c.1610
- Completed: c.1625

Technical details
- Floor count: 2

Pen-y-Clawdd Court is a Grade I listed country house in Llanvihangel Crucorney, Monmouthshire, Wales, situated 1 mile (1.6 km) to the southwest of the village off the A465 road. It is a Tudor manor house, which lies within the bailey of what was Pen y Clawdd Castle, and is thought to date from circa 1625.

== History ==
The remains of an adjoining Norman motte and bailey castle known as Penyclawdd Castle are still discernible. Its history is not well documented, but it is thought to date from the late 11th century when Roger de Hastings was building castles in the area. According to the Inquisito post mortem of 1349, conducted during the 22nd year of the reign of Edward III, the manor at the time was in the possession of Laurence Hastings, 1st Earl of Pembroke.

The current house probably dates from the early 16th century, and began as a heavily timber-framed structure, but underwent major restructuring between about 1610 and 1625. A wing with a stair tower was added, though it is possible that the other kitchen wing was older and was simply refurbished at that time. It was subject to minor refurbishment in the 19th century.

In the early 20th century it was described by Joseph Bradney in his History of Monmouthshire as a "roomy mansion with the remains of walls enclosing gardens but the whole had become sadly neglected."

On 5 June 1952 it became a Grade I listed building. Further repair work was done between 1984 and 1997, mainly to the stonework and to replace the old oak windows. After a period as a bed and breakfast hotel, the court was sold in 2021 and it is again a private residence.

The hilly area of Bryn Arw, to the west of the house, has been investigated by archaeologists. By 2000, some 183 flints, including 39 scrapers and 9 blades had been found on the site.

== Architecture ==
Pen-y-Clawdd Court, described by The Welsh Academy encyclopaedia of Wales as "a memorable manor house with splendid chimney stacks", is built in an L-shaped plan on the site of a medieval manor. It comprises three main sections, with a rectangular entrance, a tall wing, known as the Stuart wing on the left, and a kitchen wing on the right. It is built from coursed red sandstone rubble, with a Welsh slate roof.

The interior is a maze of rooms set at different levels with low ceilings and a wealth of architectural detail. It retains its 17th century ambience, though many changes were made during refurbishment between 1984 and 1997. The Dining Room is to the right and the Sitting Room to the left of the hall. Both feature beams across the ceiling, flagstone floors, and fireplaces with chamfered stone lintels. The Grand staircase, with oak steps, is situated in the Stuart wing. On the upper floor are bedrooms with chamfered ceiling beams. The largest room, the Court Room, features a compartmented ceiling with a moulded surround fireplace.
