= St Michael's Church, Llanvihangel Crucorney =

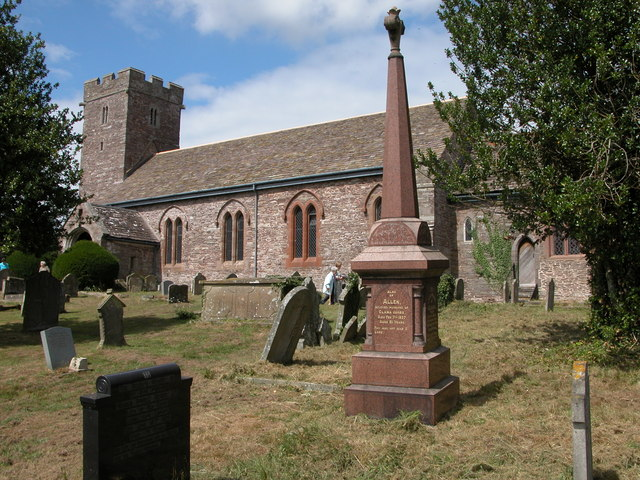
- Church of St Michael
- St Michael's Church, Llanvihangel Crucorney
- 51.8797°N 2.9821°W
- Location: Monmouthshire
- Country: Wales
- Denomination: Church in Wales
- Website: Official website

History
- Status: Parish church

Architecture
- Heritage designation: Grade II listed
- Designated: 1956

Administration
- Diocese: Monmouth

St Michael's Church stands in the centre of the village of Llanvihangel Crucorney, Monmouthshire, Wales. It was designated as a Grade II listed building in 1956 for its historic importance and surviving medieval features.

== History ==
The Book of Llandaff suggests the church was founded before the close of the tenth century. The church is said to have been built as the successor to the small chapel of St Michael, which formerly stood at the peak of the Skirrid, a short distance to the south of Llanvihangel Crucorney.

In 1542, King Henry VIII granted the tithes of Llanvihangel Crucorney and several neighbouring parishes to the establishment and maintenance of a grammar school for boys at Abergavenny.

== Architecture ==
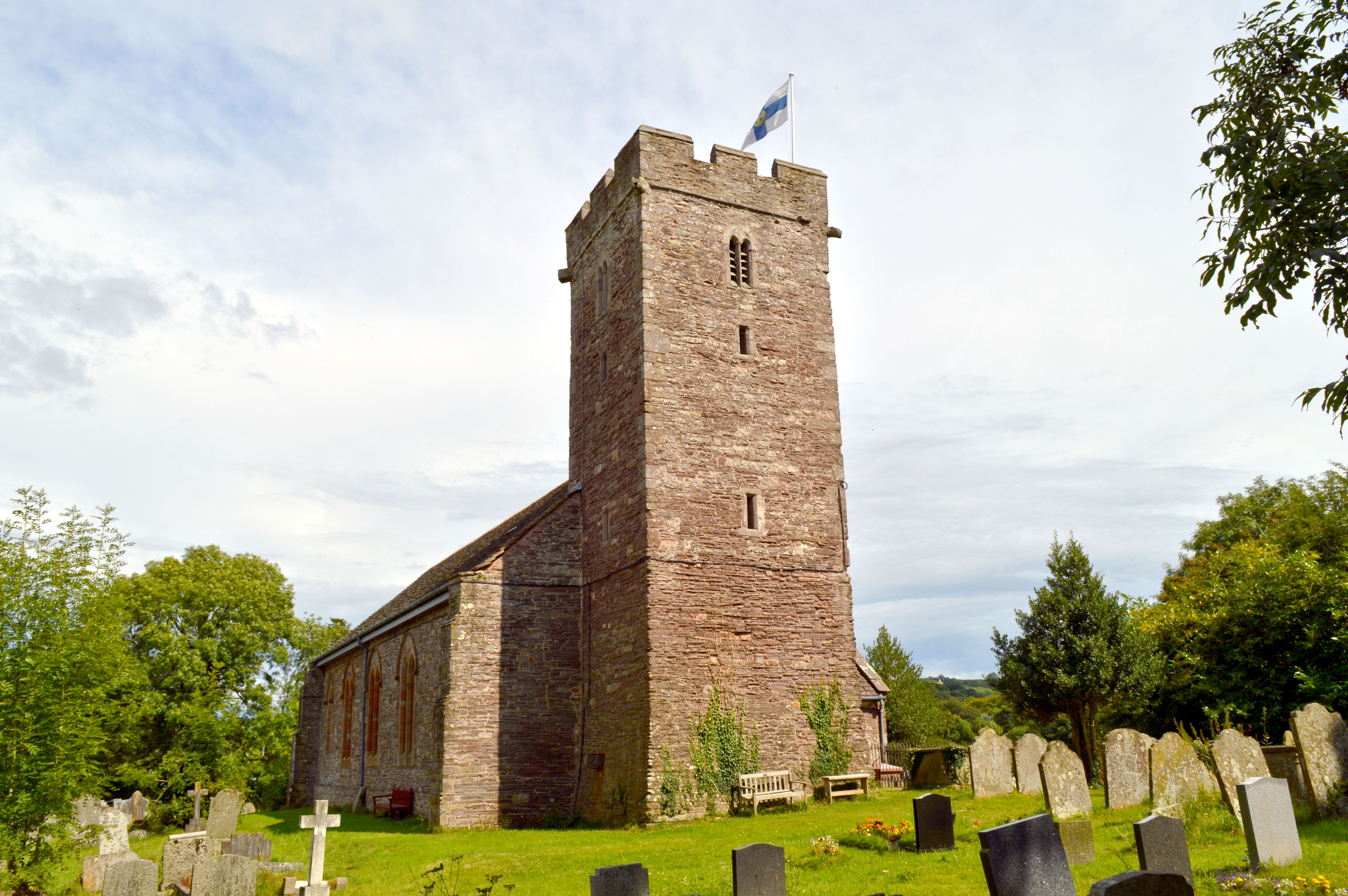
The church tower.

The nave of the church is of Norman origin, though it has since seen many alterations. The base of the tower and the chancel were probably added in the 13th or 14th centuries, and it is likely the tower was extended to its current height and the south porch was built in the 16th century.

In 1835 the nave had fallen into disrepair. Instead of being repaired the nave walls were largely pulled down and rebuilt. With them the original oak roof was destroyed and replaced by an extemporaneous roof. The present windows were inserted later that century, between 1887 and 1897.

In 1974 history repeated itself as the nave roof was again failing so it was pulled down. This time the church could only afford to partially rebuild the roof so much of the nave remained exposed to the elements until the 2000s when a new roof was built with the help of the Heritage Lottery Fund.
