= Monmouth Cap =

Hamlet in Monmouthshire, Wales

Coordinates: 51.9309°N 2.8834°W

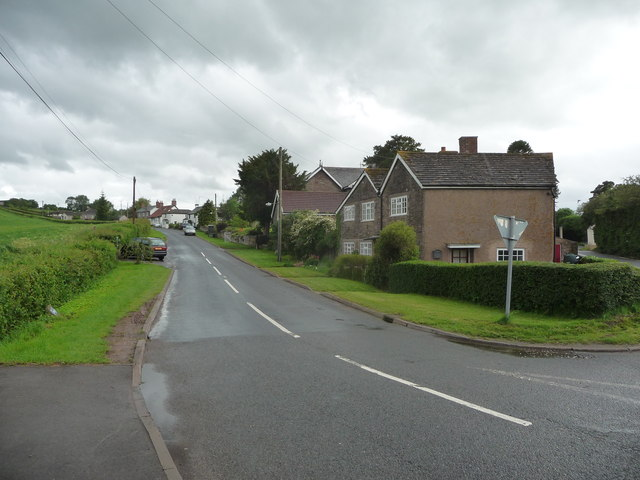
- The minor road through the centre of the hamlet

- Location within Monmouthshire
- OS grid reference: SO 3935 2618
- Principal area: Monmouthshire
- Preserved county: Gwent
- Country: Wales
- Sovereign state: United Kingdom
- Post town: USK
- Postcode district: NP
- Police: Gwent
- Fire: South Wales
- Ambulance: Welsh
- UK Parliament: Monmouth

Monmouth Cap is a hamlet in the north of the county of Monmouthshire, Wales. It stands to the north of the village of Grosmont, and to the south of the village of Pontrilas, just over the border in England.

== History and description ==
The hamlet is located in the very north of the county of Monmouthshire, on the border with Herefordshire. It stands on the minor road from Llangua to Grosmont, east of the A465. In the 19th century it formed a stopping point for the Grosmont Railway, a horse-drawn railway that connected Llanvihangel Crucorney with Hereford. To the north of the hamlet, the River Monnow forms the Welsh–English border, and is crossed by a road bridge and the Llangua Bridge, a tramway bridge dating from 1826.

The hamlet contains a number of listed buildings, centred on Monmouth Cap Farm. These include the farmhouse itself, a barn and a cow shelter. The Royal Commission on the Ancient and Historical Monuments of Wales (RCAHMW) identifies the barn as a corn store, of 18th-century date.

== Sources ==
- Cook, R. A.; Clinker, C.R. (1984). Early Railways between Abergavenny and Hereford. RCHS. ISBN 0901461369.
