= Crucorney =

Crucorney: Welsh: Crucornau
- Community
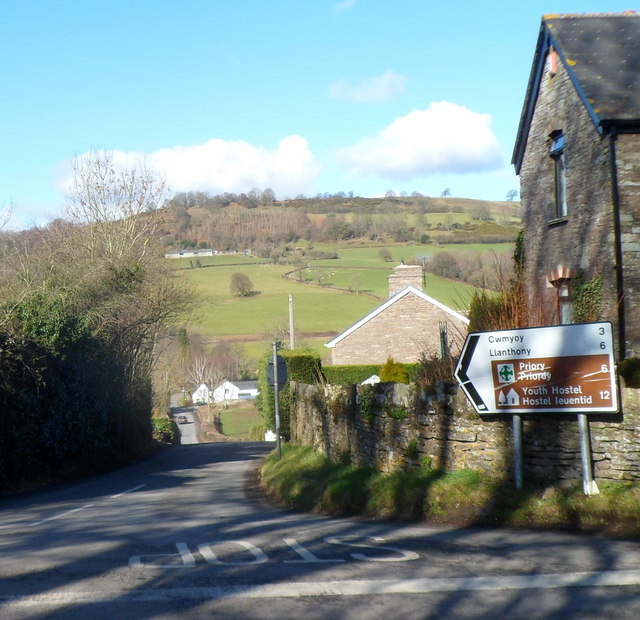
- Road to Cwmyoy and Llanthony near the Skirrid Inn, Llanvihangel Crucorney

- Location within Monmouthshire
- Principal area: Monmouthshire
- Country: Wales
- Sovereign state: United Kingdom
- Police: Gwent
- Fire: South Wales
- Ambulance: Welsh
- List of places UK Wales Monmouthshire 51.9086°N 3.0285°W Map of the community

Crucorney (Welsh: Crucornau) is a community in the county of Monmouthshire, Wales. It is the northernmost community in the county and covers the villages of Llanvihangel Crucorney, Pandy, Cwmyoy and Llanthony amongst others. The Vale of Ewyas comprises much of the northern part of the community, with the River Honddu running through Llanthony and Llanvihangel Crucorney, before turning northeast passing Pandy towards the River Monnow. The 2011 population was 1,201.

Notable landmarks include Llanthony Priory, a Grade I listed former Augustinian priory at Llanthony. Offa's Dyke Path runs along the border between Crucorney and the English county of Herefordshire. The community also has a voluntary group, The Crucorney Environmental Group, which oversees environmental and sustainability issues, including sustainable development, recycling and litter picking.

== Governance ==
The community elects a community council of eleven councillors. The council meets monthly on the third Tuesday of each month.

Crucorney is also the name of the electoral ward for Monmouthshire County Council. The ward also covers the neighbouring Grosmont community and elects one county councillor.
