= Abergavenny Bridge =

Abergavenny Bridge Pont Y Fenni
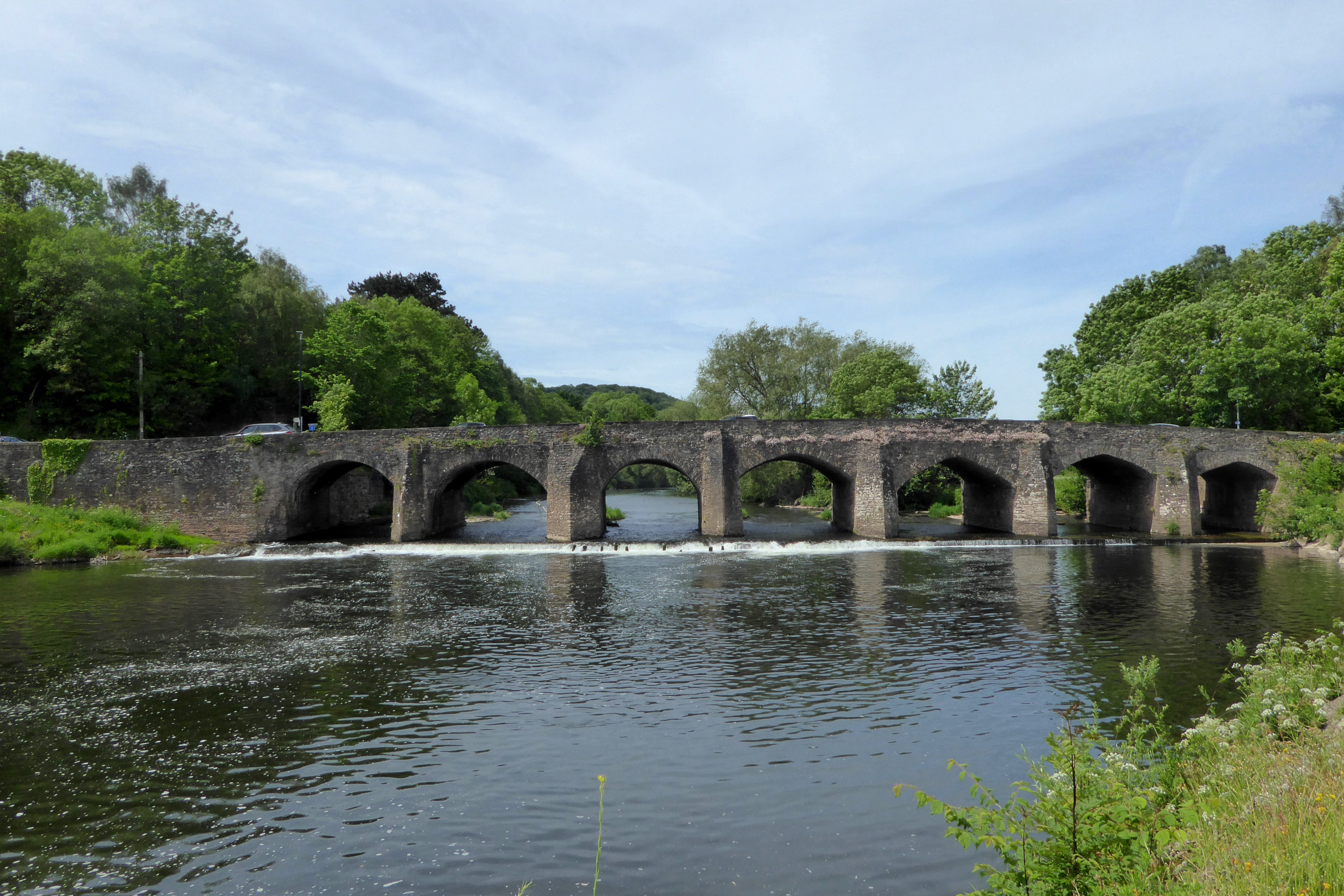
- Coordinates: 51.8194°N 3.0292°W
- Carries: road traffic
- Crosses: River Usk
- Locale: Abergavenny, Monmouthshire, Wales

Characteristics
- No. of spans: 7
- Piers in water: 6

History
- Construction start: Medieval

Listed Building – Grade II*
- Official name: Usk Bridge (also known as Abergavenny Bridge)
- Designated: 7 May 1952
- Reference no.: 24229

Scheduled monument
- Official name: Abergavenny Bridge
- Reference no.: NM10

Abergavenny Bridge, (also known as Usk Bridge), crosses the River Usk at the boundary between Abergavenny and Llanfoist. The bridge carries the A4143. The bridge is of medieval origin, but was substantially reconstructed in the early 19th century, to support a tramroad, and in the mid 19th century, when the two bridges were combined.

== History ==
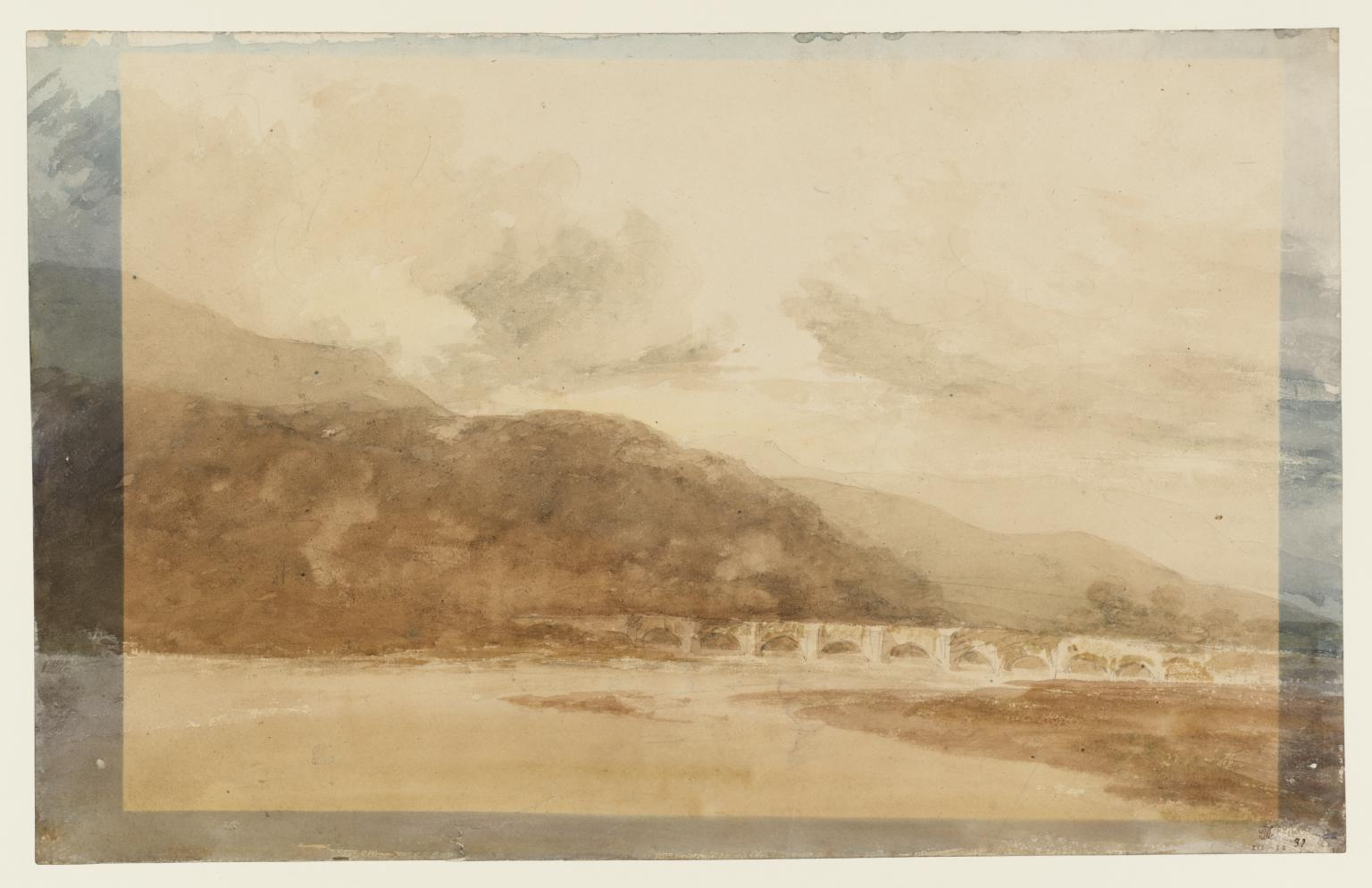
A view of the bridge by J. M. W. Turner

The bridge was originally known as Tudor Bridge, due to the historical tradition that it was built by Jasper Tudor, Duke of Bedford, who was also Baron Abergavenny. This supports a construction date of the mid-15th century.

The early 19th century tramway, which originally ran parallel to the bridge, was constructed in 1811 by William Crossley. The tramway carried the Llanvihangel Railway from the canal at Llanfoist. In the mid-19th century the bridge and the tramway were combined.

The bridge was the subject of two paintings by J. M. W. Turner dating from the 1790s. The first, Abergavenny Bridge, Monmouthshire, Clearing Up after a Showery Day, is held in the collection of the Victoria and Albert Museum The second, entitled Abergavenny Bridge, is held by The Tate but is not exhibited due to deterioration of the paintwork.

In 2016 Monmouthshire County Council began a consultation on the construction of a pedestrian and cycleway bridge, 300m to the east of the Abergavenny Bridge.

== Description ==
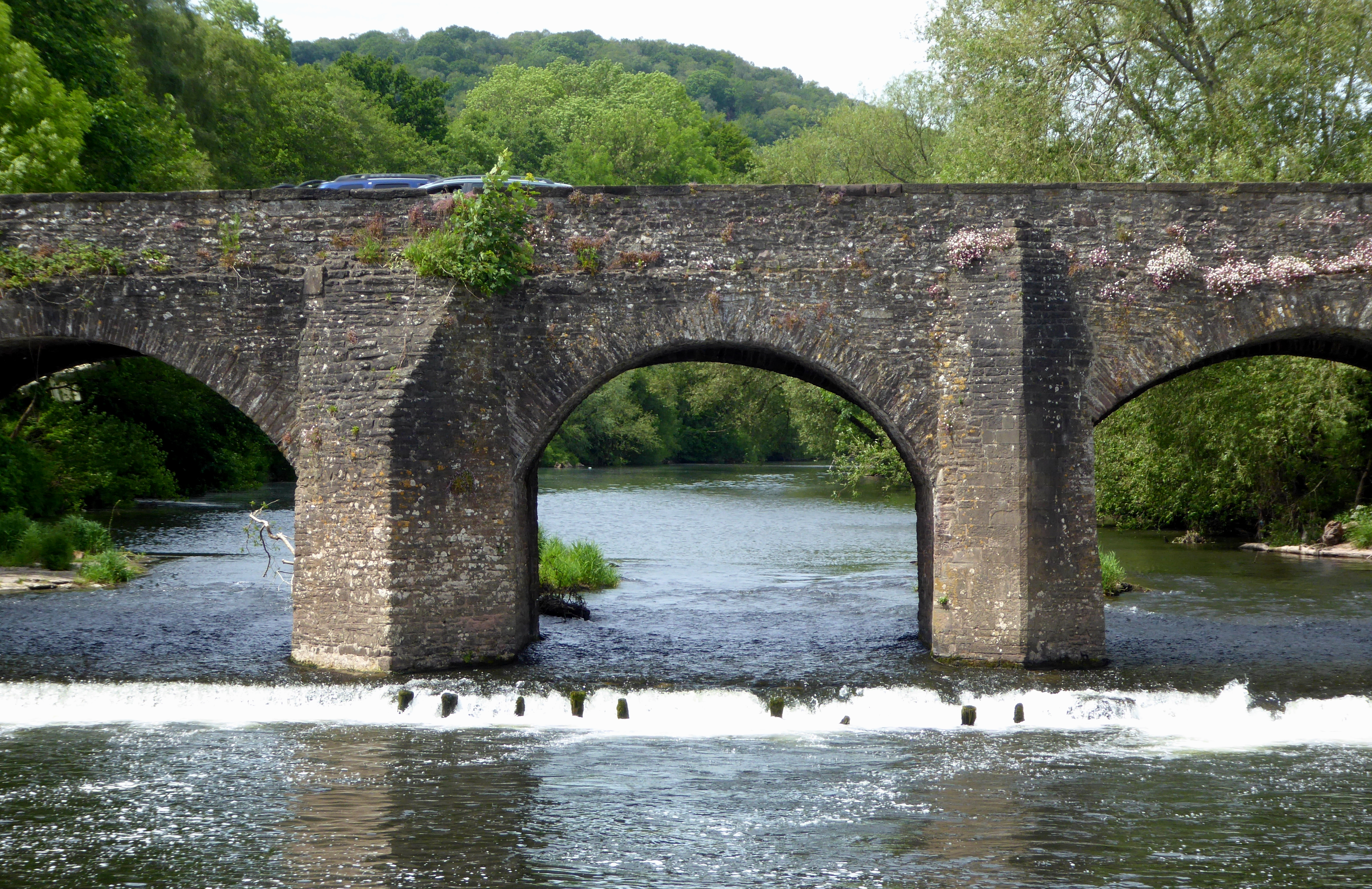
Archway of the bridge, as seen from the east

The bridge has seven voussoired arches and cutwaters below. The parapets were rebuilt in the 20th century, and have flat coping stones. It is a Grade II* listed building and a Scheduled Monument.
