= Grosmont Railway =

Horse-drawn railway in Monmouthshire, UK

The Grosmont Railway was an early horse-drawn railway line in Monmouthshire completed in 1819.

== History ==
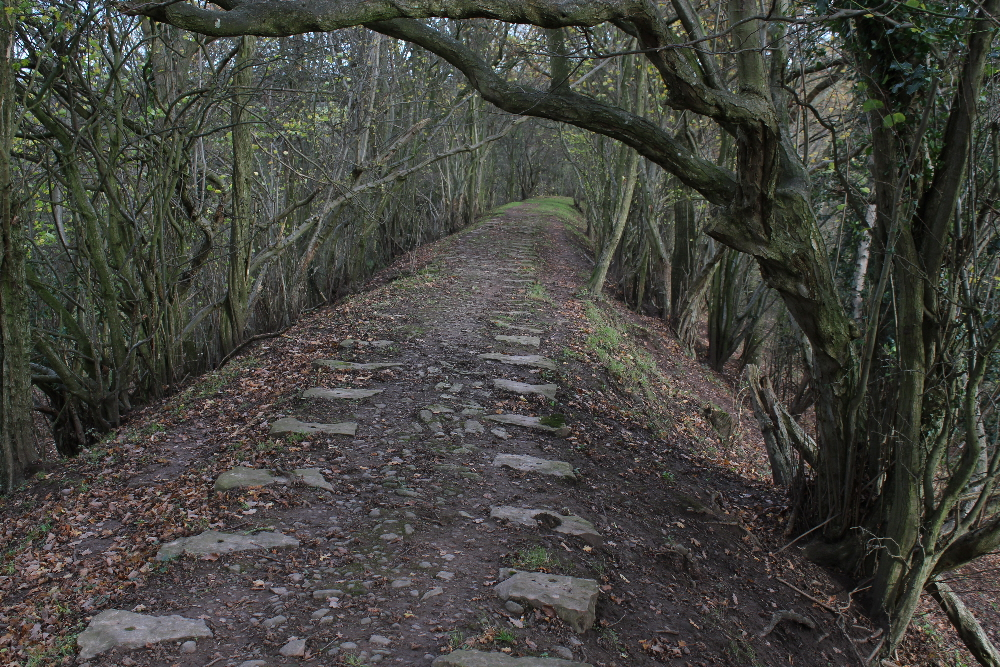
Grosmont Railway embankment at Werngifford, Monmouthshire (SO333212)

Grosmont Railway Act 1812
- Act of Parliament
- Parliament of the United Kingdom
- Long title: An Act for making and maintaining a Railway from the End of the Llanvihangel Railway, in the Parish of Llanvihangel Crucorney, in the County of Monmouth, to or near to the Twelfth Mile Stone, in the Road leading from the Town of Abergavenny, in the County of Monmouth, to the City of Hereford.
- Citation: 52 Geo. 3. c. cvii

Dates
- Royal assent: 20 May 1812

Text of statute as originally enacted

The Grosmont Railway was constructed as an extension of the Llanvihangel Railway from its terminus at Llanvihangel Crucorney to Monmouth Cap on the border with Herefordshire. With a length of approximately seven miles (11 km), it was engineered by John Hodgkinson as a 3 ft 6 in (1,067 mm) gauge plateway, and was horse drawn throughout. The act of Parliament for the railway, the Grosmont Railway Act 1812 (52 Geo. 3. c. cvii) received royal assent on 20 May 1812, construction started in 1817 and the line opened in 1819.

In 1829 the Hereford Railway was completed with an end-on connection with the Grosmont Railway at Monmouth Cap and extending the line to Wye Bridge at Hereford.

The Grosmont Railway was sold in 1846 to the Newport, Abergavenny and Hereford Railway Company for £16,250, along with the Llanvihangel Railway for £21,750 and the Hereford Railway for £19,460. The new company replaced the combined tramroads with a standard-gauge steam railway.

== Remnants ==
The replacement railway was built to the north of the old line, while the tramroad became a road (now part of the main A465 road between Abergavenny and Hereford). At Werngifford a major remnant survives in the form of a 360m length of tramroad embankment with stone sleepers in situ. It is designated a scheduled monument.
