= Llwyn-celyn Farmhouse =

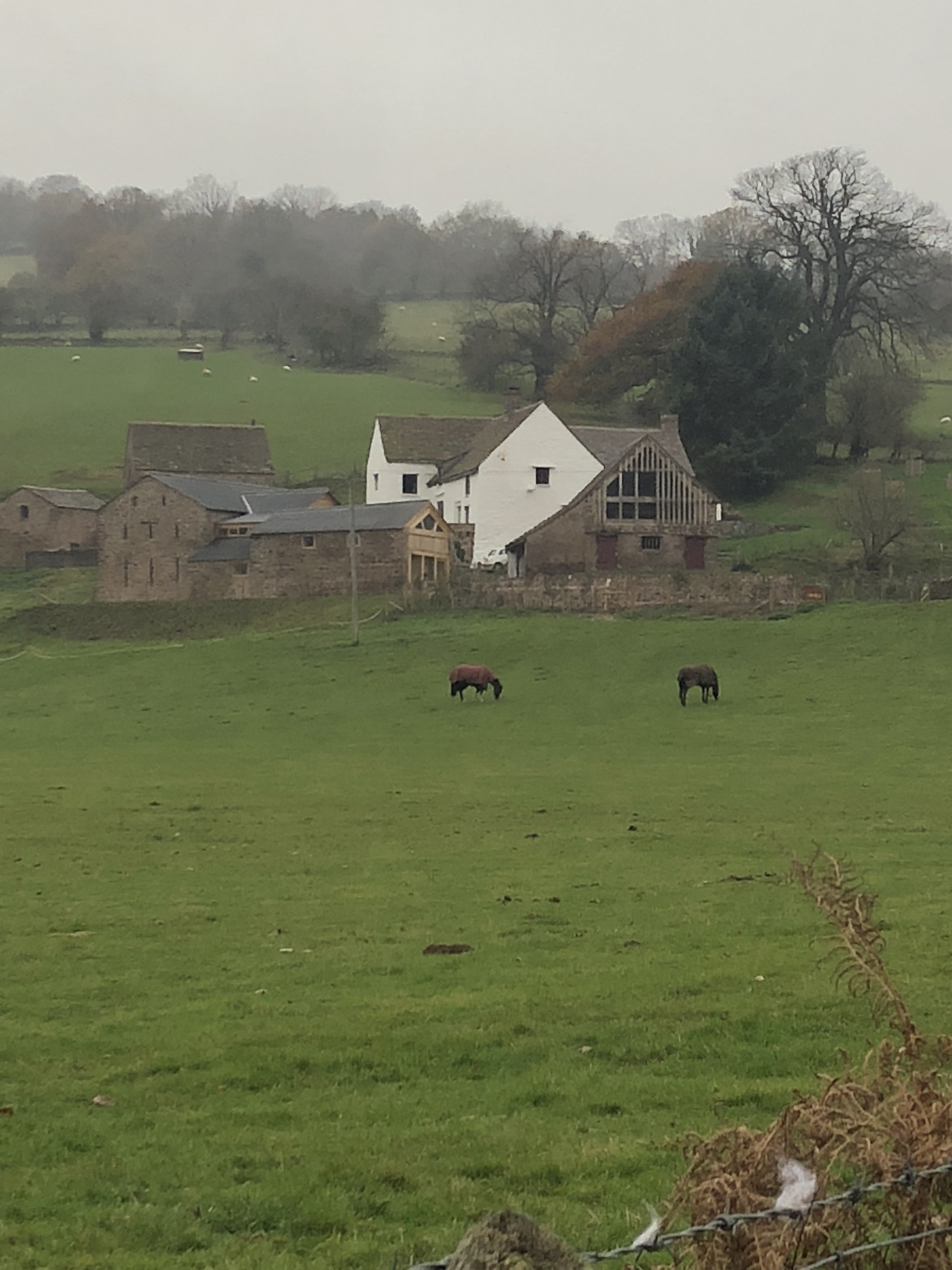
- The farmhouse in November 2018 with major renovations complete

- Location within Monmouthshire
- 51.8905°N 3.0047°W
- Type: Farmhouse
- Location: Llanvihangel Crucorney, Monmouthshire

History
- Built: Late medieval

Site notes
- Governing body: Landmark Trust

Listed Building – Grade I
- Official name: Llwyn-celyn Farmhouse
- Designated: 9 January 1956
- Reference no.: 1937

Llwyn-celyn Farmhouse, Llanvihangel Crucorney, Monmouthshire is a farmhouse of late medieval origins. It is a Grade I listed building.

== History ==
The original farmhouse is a late-medieval hall house of c.1420. In the late 17th century, both the hall, and the attached solar block were horizontally divided to create two-storeyed buildings. An outhouse, with what was originally a free-standing kitchen, was linked to the main block in the 19th century, when the farm was part of the Llanthony Priory estate and owned by the poet Walter Savage Landor.

There were subsequently almost no alterations made to the building for over 100 years. By the early 21st century, the house was in a state of decay and, in 2014, ownership passed to the Landmark Trust. The Trust commenced a £4.5m restoration, which is largely complete as of November 2018.

== Architecture and description ==
The architectural historian John Newman describes the farmhouse as "quite exceptional, a complete late medieval hall house, all of stone." Sir Cyril Fox and Lord Raglan, in the first of their three-volume study Monmouthshire Houses, give a construction date of c.1500, slightly later than that posited by Cadw and the Landmark Trust. The roofs of the, now two-storeyed, hall and parlour show evidence of smoke-blackening, indicating that they were "originally open full-height." Peter Smith, in his study Houses of the Welsh Countryside, notes the innovatory treatment of the hall and cross-passage. The exterior is of Old Red Sandstone rubble.
