= Glyncorrwg Mineral Railway =

Goods railway in Wales

The Glyncorrwg Mineral Railway, later known as Parsons' Folly, was a goods railway constructed between 1839 and 1842 to transport coal from mines in Port Talbot in the South Wales Coalfield to the Neath Canal at Aberdulais. The ownership of the line changed several times before it was finally abandoned in 1852. Much of the route can still be followed and significant civil engineering features remain.

== Background ==
The Glyncorrwg Mineral Railway was promoted by Charles Strange and Robert Parsons, both of whom were from in London and had no previous experience of mining or railways, and no known connection with South Wales.

=== Robert Parsons ===
Robert Parsons (1811–1873) was born in Edenbridge, Kent. By 1832, he had moved to Barnet, Hertfordshire where he set up in business as a linen draper. In 1836 he was in Wood Green, north London, still as a draper, and by 1837 he had moved again to Fenchurch Street in the heart of the City of London. How he came to meet Strange and enter into partnership with him is not known, but it would appear that Parsons was the dominant partner and that their coal mining venture probably originated with him.

=== Charles Strange ===
Charles Strange (1806–1874) was one of five sons born to William Strange (1765–1836), a successful wholesale grocer in the City of London, by his second wife. In 1831 he entered his father's business and together with his brother Henry took over the cheesemongering side. However, in February 1837, within a year of their father's death, they gave up this business and by the following September Charles Strange, in partnership with Robert Parsons, had moved to south Wales and started to invest heavily in coal mining. The principal source of capital for the business was Charles Strange. His younger brothers, Thomas (1808–1876) and Samuel (1811–1889), provided further support. All had been left well provided for on the death of their father in 1836. In addition to the proceeds from the sale of the cheese business, Charles had inherited property in Bishopsgate, London, a cash sum, entitlement to interest payable on mortgages granted by his father and a share in dairy farms in Essex which were sold in 1838. With one exception, noted below, there is no evidence of any financial investment in the business from outside the Strange family.

== History ==
What exactly led Parsons and Strange to enter an industry of which they had no previous experience in a part of the country with which they had no previous connection is not known. However, the 1830s was a period of sustained economic growth in the United Kingdom which resulted in a strong demand for coal and this in turn led to a number of entrepreneurs choosing to enter the industry. Further, due to the development of locomotive-powered railways, the inland coal field in south Wales was now becoming available for intensive exploitation. The Afan valley in particular, the area where Parsons and Strange chose to operate, was ripe for development. A new dock had been opened at Port Talbot in 1837 and local industrialists, such as John Vigurs of Cwmavon and Joseph Tregelles Price of Neath Abbey ironworks, were seriously interested in acquiring the coal in this area.

== Mineral estate ==
Parsons and Strange took their first mineral leases from landowners in the Afan valley and its tributary valleys in the latter part of 1837. Within a year they had acquired a mineral estate extending over about 5,500 acres, in some cases including the surface rights as well. As was normal practice, they were committed to paying a royalty on the actual quantity of coal that was extracted and in addition a 'dead rent' that had to be paid regardless of whether or not any coal was raised. The total due in dead rents amounted to £2,300 per annum, a liability which contributed greatly to the financial failure of the partners within a few years, especially since they were never able to work the coal under many of the properties that they had leased.

== Railway ==
The Glyncorrwg Mineral Railway was essential to the plans of Parsons and Strange: without it, it would have been impossible to bring the coal to market in economic quantities and allow it to be sold at competitive rates.

It was built under the terms of the 'eight-mile clause' in the Neath Canal Navigation Company's Act of Parliament of 1791 which gave powers to the canal company or individual industrialists with the consent of the company to build railways to mines, quarries etc. within eight miles of the canal. Parsons and Strange gave notice to the Canal Company in March 1839 that they intended to seek powers under this clause and their application was approved at the company's General Assembly on 4 July 1839.

Construction started almost immediately under the direction of the local mining engineer and surveyor, William Kirkhouse (c1785–1873). By December 1839 work was sufficiently advanced for him to start sourcing the rails, seeking quotes from the iron manufacturers Harford, Davies & Co of Ebbw Vale Ebbw Vale and Rowland Fothergill of the Abernant ironworks at Aberdare. The first four miles to a coal level which they opened on the Fforchdwm estate were probably completed by mid-1840 with the exception of the powered incline at the head of the Gwenffrwd valley where there were delays with the construction of the engine house. It was probably June 1841 before the railway was fully operational, that being the month when the first consignment of coal was shipped on the Tennant Canal.

The railway terminated at a wharf on the eastern bank of the Neath Canal at Aberdulais (SS 7744 9931) just south of the junction point with the Tennant Canal Tennant Canal. This provided an outlet to the two shipping places of Briton Ferry (via the Neath Canal) and Swansea (via the Tennant Canal). From Aberdulais the railway climbed a series of four self-acting inclines to the top of Cefn Morfydd, each one leading into the next. The railway then ran through a deep cutting and over a high embankment for just over half a mile before descending by means of a powered incline into Cwmgwenffrwd. This was the only powered incline on the railway since this was the only one where the gradient was against the load. The stationary engine to work the incline was supplied from Neath Abbey ironworks in 1840/41. No trace of the engine house survives but the retaining wall of the reservoir which held water for the engine remains nearby. From the foot of this incline the railway then followed the Gwenffrwd and Pelena rivers to Fforchdwm level, taking a course now followed by the road through the village of Tonmawr which grew up around it from the 1840s.

The construction of these first four miles exhausted all the partners' capital yet most of the mineral estate still remained unworked. To extend the railway and bring these areas into production Parsons and Strange had to seek loans. Early in 1842 they approached James Morrison who granted loans which enabled them to extend the railway to his property of Tonmawr Uchaf and then, later in the same year, to the adjacent property of Blaencregan, the furthest point that the railway reached, a distance of 6½ miles from Aberdulais. Whilst the railway never reached the village of Glyncorrwg its terminus at Blaencregan lay just within the parish of Glyncorrwg, thus justifying its name. This section included a fine stone arched viaduct over the river Pelena which was destroyed in 1979, although the piers remain, hidden in the forestry.

The railway as built was not what had originally been envisaged. The original plan had been to build a connection into the existing Oakwood Railway which ran from the Oakwood ironworks near Pontrhydyfen down the Afan valley to the new dock at Port Talbot. This would have required the construction of only a few additional miles of railway along the flank of the valley which would have been cheap to construct and, having no inclines to interrupt the flow of traffic, simple to operate. This plan was frustrated by the refusal of the landowner, Christopher Rice Mansel Talbot, to grant a wayleave across two of his farms. Consequently, Parsons and Strange had to adopt an alternative route (the route that was actually built), although it was both more expensive to construct and more difficult to operate efficiently (by reason of the repeated interruptions to traffic flow caused by the inclines).

The railway was an edge railway, not a plateway (or 'tramroad'). The gauge was a rather narrow 3ft gauge. The rails were somewhat heavier than Kirkhouse had initially intended, 34 lb/yd instead of 26 to 30 lb. They were laid on stone blocks with occasional wooden sleepers. Haulage on the level sections was by horse; Parsons claimed that he intended to acquire two locomotives but these never materialised.

== Mines ==
Parsons and Strange opened five coal levels along the length of the railway: Bryngwyneithin, Tonmawr Isaf, Fforchdwm, Tonmawr Uchaf and Blaencregan. The first three came on stream in the summer of 1841, the other two in mid-1842. Bryngwyneithin and Fforchdwm were the most successful.

Production from these five levels was probably in the order of 150 to 200 tons a day although under abnormal conditions output is known to have exceeded 400 tons a day and on one occasion to have been as high as 468 tons. This placed Parsons and Strange among the larger producers in the district. The principal market for the coal seems to have been the copper mines of Cornwall but there were also local sales in and around Neath. Parsons also planned to supply the domestic market in Swansea but this hope was never realised.

== Failure of Parsons and Strange ==
By the winter of 1842/43 it had become clear that Parsons and Strange were in financial trouble. Their own resources had run out and in the harsh economic climate of the 1840s it was difficult to attract investors willing to provide further capital. The coal business probably covered its costs but without generating sufficient surplus income to invest in extending the railway and opening further levels. Above all, there was the burden of the dead rents. By the summer of 1843 Parsons and Strange had been reduced to trading for ready cash only and had difficulty in paying their workmen's wages.

One party who became aware of this situation was John Rutter, a solicitor of Shaftesbury, Dorset who acted on behalf of James Morrison. He believed that with further capital and good management the colliery could be successful and during 1843 he took a number of steps to ensure that he would be in a position to acquire the business when Parsons and Strange had to admit failure. These included commissioning Joshua Richardson, a civil engineer then resident in Croydon, to prepare a detailed report on the state of the railway and the colliery, in order both to supply professional confirmation of his own judgment and to provide evidence that could be used to reassure potential financial backers whom he would need, his own resources being limited.

Rutter's plans were frustrated, however, when Parsons and Strange were rescued by Thomas Sturge. Sturge was a wealthy and philanthropic Quaker who had become rich through the whale oil trade. He was a cousin of John Rutter who had approached him as a potential backer earlier in 1843. At the time he had shown no interest but when Parsons approached him again in August 1843, Sturge agreed to relieve Parsons and Strange of the business, pay all their outstanding debts and give them both salaried positions. Rutter was sidelined in these negotiations and his hopes of acquiring the colliery and the railway were destroyed.

== Subsequent history ==
Sturge took possession of the colliery and the railway in September 1843. Through his solicitor, Frederick Green he paid off all the outstanding debts and surrendered the leases of all the unworked properties which the railway had not reached. This considerably reduced the extent of the mineral estate and the corresponding outgoings in rent. The only coal levels that remained in production were Bryngwyneithin and Fforchdwm; consequently the 1842 extension of the railway fell out of use although the track remained in place. The business was managed by Green, his firm of solicitors, Weymouth & Green, having been made Sturge's trustee.

This arrangement lasted until November 1844 when Sturge transferred ownership to Weymouth & Green. They continued to operate the colliery and the railway although with disappointing results and increasing friction with one of their landlords, Henry John Grant of the Gnoll, whose rent and royalties went unpaid. Green claimed to have made some improvements to the railway although the exact nature of these is not clear. That the railway remained in active use during this period is confirmed by the reports of two incidents which occurred in 1847 and 1849, both on one or other of the inclines.

In an attempt to raise more capital Weymouth & Green attempted to form a company in 1847 to acquire the business but nothing came of this and their debts remained outstanding. In the end the Gnoll estate lost patience and distrained on the property. Weymouth & Green surrendered their lease in October 1849.

== Final years ==
Following the failure of Weymouth & Green, Robert Parsons once again took over what was left of the business in November 1849, now acting on his own and no longer in partnership with Strange. Since he did not attempt to renew the Gnoll lease the only level that remained in production was Fforchdwm. He continued to work this level regularly although only in comparatively small quantities until 1852 when he abandoned the colliery and lifted the entire railway. The final consignment of coal was sent down the railway on 10 May 1852 and work then commenced on dismantling it. During May and June quantities of rails, trams and other equipment were despatched to Swansea on the Tennant Canal, presumably for sale as scrap. The final load, on 25 June, was 13 tons forming 'part of an engine' (probably the engine on the fifth incline).

== Parsons' Folly ==
Following its abandonment the railway came to be known as 'Parsons' Folly'. This term was originally applied to the deep rock cutting on the summit of Cefn Morfydd which was cynically thought to have had as little practical value as the nearby Ivy Tower, a true folly built in 1795 by Molly Mackworth of the Gnoll, Neath. Later the term was extended to refer to the entire railway. The earliest documented date for its use is in a newspaper report of 1915 but it is clear from this report that by then the term was well known locally.

== Sources ==
=== Primary sources ===
- Joshua Richardson, 'Report on the Glyncorrwg Railway and Tonmawr collieries' (1843). Manuscript now in private possession; the present article uses a transcript by the late Harry Green on Neath, ©1977.
- 'Court of Chancery, Clerks of Records and Writs Office, Morrison v Sturge' (1845), The National Archives, C 14/413/M30.
- 'Tonnage books of goods on Neath and Swansea Red Jacket and Junction canals, afterwards the Tennant canal', West Glamorgan Archive Service (Swansea), D/D T 1064–1071.
- 'Ledger of the Neath Canal Navigation Company', West Glamorgan Archive Service, D/D NCa 19.
- 'Letter book of William Kirkhouse', West Glamorgan Archive Service, SL 14/1.
- 'Minutes of meeting held of creditors of Messrs Strange and Parsons held at Castle Inn, Neath, 11 June 1844', West Glamorgan Archive Service, NAS BF 1/7/6.

=== Secondary sources ===
- Harry Green, 'Parsons' Folly – the Glyncorrwg Mineral Railway', Transactions of the Neath Antiquarian Society, 1977, pp 78–88.
- Paul Reynolds, The Glyncorrwg Mineral Railway – was it Parsons' Folly? (published privately, 2024).
