= Llanvihangel Railway =

Llanvihangel Railway Act 1811
- Act of Parliament
- Parliament of the United Kingdom
- Long title: An Act for making a Railway from the Brecknock and Abergavenny Canal, in the Parish of Llanwenarth, to or near to Llanvihangel Crucorney, in the County of Monmouth.
- Citation: 51 Geo. 3. c. cxxiii

Dates
- Royal assent: 25 May 1811

Text of statute as originally enacted

The Llanvihangel Railway was an early horse-drawn railway line in Monmouthshire which operated over a 6 1/4-mile (10.1 km) route between the Brecknock and Abergavenny Canal and Llanvihangel Crucorney from 1814 until 1846. The act of Parliament for the railway, the Llanvihangel Railway Act 1811 (51 Geo. 3. c. cxxiii), received royal assent on 25 May 1811. The line was initially constructed only as far as Blaengavenny and it was 1820 or 1821 before it was extended to Llanvihangel.

Its construction followed unsuccessful attempts in 1793 and 1810 to construct a canal from Abergavenny to the Wye at Hereford. Two other similar but unsuccessful tramroad schemes were also promoted in 1810. The railway was constructed from a coal wharf on the canal east by way of Llanfoist, across the River Usk by means of a bridge constructed immediately adjacent to the existing road bridge, on its upstream side, but at a higher level above the river, then north past Abergavenny to the village of Llanvihangel Crucorney where it met with the Grosmont Railway. By 1829 the Llanvihangel Railway connected in turn with the Hereford Railway. Following the decommissioning of the Usk bridge for railway use, it was lowered and incorporated into a widened road bridge in 1868.

All three railways were sold in 1846 to the Newport, Abergavenny and Hereford Railway Company, the Llanvihangel Railway fetching a price of £21,750 (equivalent to £2,190,000 in 2025). The company replaced them with a standard-gauge steam railway.
