= Hereford Railway (England) =

The Hereford Railway was an early horse-drawn railway line in Herefordshire which operated over a 12-mile (19 km) route from its junction with the Grosmont Railway at Monmouth Cap on the Welsh border to the River Wye at Hereford opening in September 1829.

The line was authorised by the Hereford Railway Act 1826 (7 Geo. 4. c. c) and designed by John Hodgkinson (who probably also engineered the connecting Llanvihangel and Grosmont lines) as a single track line with passing loops and occasional sidings to a gauge of 3 ft 6 in (1,067 mm) using 3 and 4 foot L-section rails, manufactured it is assumed at Blaenavon and Nant-y-glo ironworks.

From Monmouth Cap, the line was constructed on a route which initially coincides with that of the modern A465 in sweeping curves north towards Pontrilas but bridged the River Dore to enter the village before continuing northeast on the line of the modern road. Near Wormbridge it ran east to a line paralleling the Worm Brook before continuing to Hereford largely on the line followed by the later mainline railway, though deviating in an arc to the west before entering the town. Its terminus was on the south bank of the Wye where the river is crossed by the new A49 bridge, the construction of which obliterated any remains.

The Hereford Railway along with the connecting Grosmont and Llanvihangel railways were sold in 1846 to the Newport, Abergavenny and Hereford Railway Company which later replaced them with a standard-gauge steam railway. The tramroad ceased functioning in May 1853 in preparation for the construction of the new mainline railway over much of its route.
