= Caerleon Tramroad =

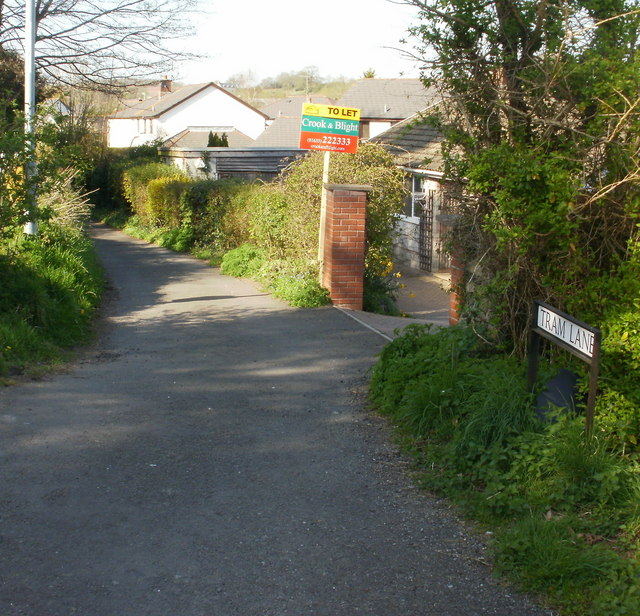
Tram Lane, Caerleon

Caerleon Tramroad was an early horse-drawn tramway built in 1794 or 1795 by Nicholas Blannin to link the forge he rented in Caerleon with the Monmouthshire Canal at Clomendy, which is now part of Cwmbran.

== Background ==
The Monmouthshire Canal Navigation Act 1792 (32 Geo. 3. c. 102), which authorised the Monmouthshire Canal included a provision that allowed the building of tramroads and stone wagon roads to ironworks, quarries and coalmines within 8 miles (13 km) of the canal. The act further allowed anyone who owned an ironworks, quarry or coalmine to request that a tramroad or wagon road be built to link their business to the canal. If the canal company did not agree to such a request in three months then the applicant could build a route at their own expense and without the consent of the owners of the lands or rivers that the route crossed.

The tramroad has sometimes been dated to as early as 1770, although this is discounted as too early as records show it was commissioned in 1793 and completed by 1795.

== Construction ==
Nicholas Blannin requested such a route and when it was refused he built a tramroad at his own cost, and sold a half share of it in 1795. He also continued the tramroad down to river Usk at Caerleon where he built a wharf and quay.

== Closure ==
In 1874 the Pontypool, Caerleon and Newport Railway opened and had powers to acquire the tramroad. The new standard gauge railway obliterated much of the tramroad although it did continue to operate for some years after south of the works at Ponthir.

== Remains ==
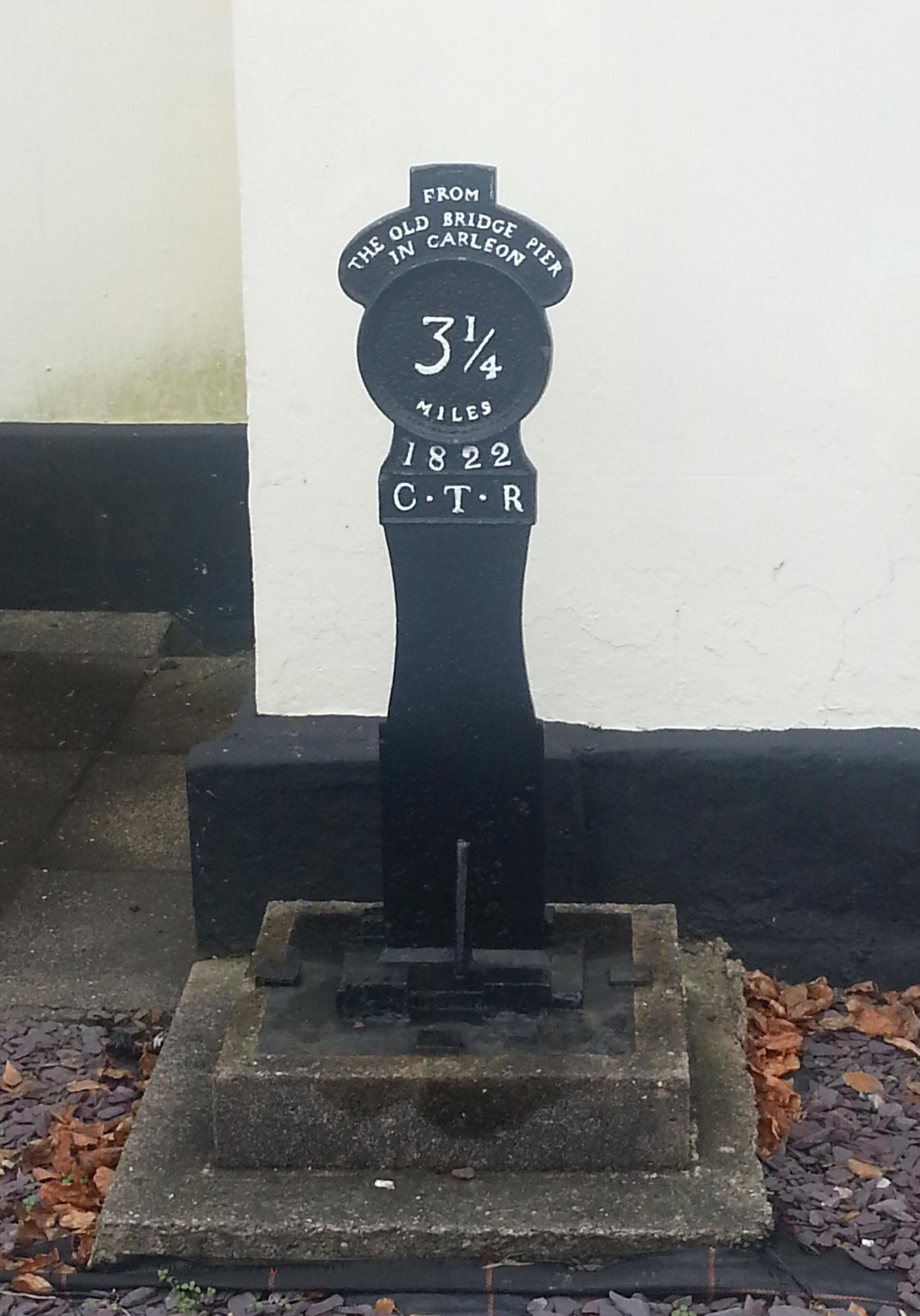
Surviving milepost

Very little remains of the tramroad although parts of the route are now paths. A milepost from the tramroad was recovered from the Afon Llwyd. It was presented to Caerleon Town Council and erected next to the Endowed School, Caerleon in 1977.
