= Llanvihangel Crucorney =

Village in Monmouthshire, Wales

Coordinates: 51.87907°N 2.981892°W

Llanvihangel Crucorney: Welsh: Llanfihangel Crucornau
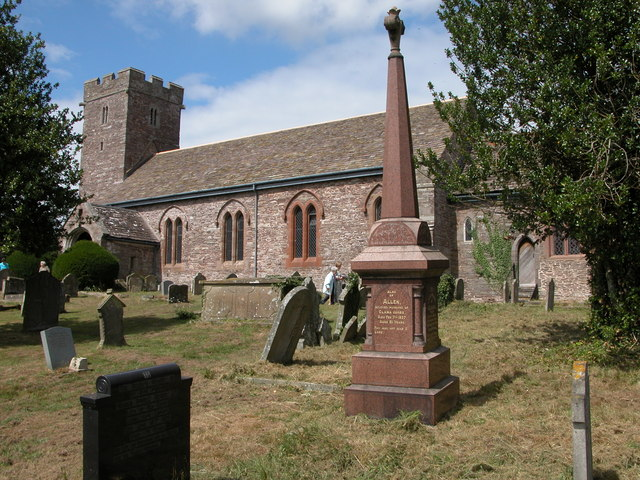
- Church of St. Michael and All Angels

- Location within Monmouthshire
- Population: 1,201 (2011)
- OS grid reference: SO325206
- Principal area: Monmouthshire
- Preserved county: Gwent
- Country: Wales
- Sovereign state: United Kingdom
- Post town: ABERGAVENNY
- Postcode district: NP7
- Dialling code: 01600
- Police: Gwent
- Fire: South Wales
- Ambulance: Welsh
- UK Parliament: Monmouth

Llanvihangel Crucorney (Welsh: Llanfihangel Crucornau) is a small village in the community (parish) of Crucorney, Monmouthshire, Wales. It is located 5 miles (8.0 km) north of Abergavenny and 18 miles (29 km) southwest of Hereford, England on the A465 road.

== Setting ==
Llanvihangel Crucorney lies on the eastern edge of the Black Mountains in the Brecon Beacons National Park. The village sits at the entrance to the Vale of Ewyas (also known as the Llanthony Valley). The sweeping hill the village sits on is a terminal moraine, deposited during the last Ice Age, that marks the maximum advance of a glacier that once flowed down the valley. The Skirrid is located just to the south; its distinctive peak forms an imposing local landmark. The village is surrounded by farmland with a mix of pasture, for sheep and dairy cattle grazing, and arable crops. The area is popular with hill walkers and the long-distance trails of the Beacons Way and Offa's Dyke Path pass close by.

== History, amenities and architecture ==
=== Amenities ===
In the centre of the village is a church, village shop and garage as well as The Skirrid Inn, which claims to be the oldest public house in Wales. There is a primary school and village hall located in nearby Pandy. The nearest railway station is Abergavenny.

=== Architecture ===
The village is characterised by its stone-built architecture, with many historic properties interspersed with more recently built homes. Notable buildings include:

- St Michael's Church stands at the historic centre of the village. The church is of Norman origin and has surviving medieval features.
- Llanvihangel Court. A historic, Grade I listed manor house with landscaped gardens, located a short distance away from the village centre. Dating from the 16th century, it has been described as "the most impressive and richly decorated house of around 1600 in Monmouthshire". The house is open to the public several days a year.
- Llwyn-celyn Farmhouse, in the nearby hamlet of Stanton. A Grade I listed, late medieval hall house considered to be one of the most remarkable surviving stone houses in Wales. Having been occupied continuously from 1480 until 2014, it is now in the care of the Landmark Trust who are repairing and restoring the house so that it can be let out for holidays and short breaks.
- Pen-y-Clawdd Court, 1 mile (1.6 km) to the southwest of the village. A Grade I listed Tudor manor house thought to date from circa 1625, on the site of a Norman motte and bailey castle.

== Railways ==
The 3 ft 6 in (1,067 mm) gauge Llanvihangel Railway opened in 1814 between Govilon on the Brecknock and Abergavenny Canal and Llanvihangel Crucorney. Here it joined with the Grosmont Railway, thence via the Hereford Railway to Hereford. The railway was abandoned in 1846.

The Grosmont Railway was constructed as an extension of the Llanvihangel Railway from its terminus at Llanvihangel Crucorney to Monmouth Cap on the border with Herefordshire. With a length of approximately seven miles (11 km), it was engineered by John Hodgkinson as a 3 ft 6in gauge plateway, and was horse-drawn throughout. The act of Parliament for the railway, the Grosmont Railway Act 1812 (52 Geo. 3. c. cvii), received royal assent on 20 May 1812, and the line opened in 1819.

The Newport, Abergavenny and Hereford Railway opened the standard gauge Llanvihangel railway station in 1854. It closed in 1958.

== Governance ==
The village falls in the 'Crucorney' electoral ward. This ward includes Grosmont in addition to this village. The total ward population taken at the 2011 census was 2,121. The Crucorney Community Council has 11 seats over 5 wards. The Llanvihangel Crucorney Ward has 6 seats, Forest and Ffwddog Ward has 2 seats, and there is one seat each in Bwlch, Trewyn and Oldcastle Ward, Lower Cwmyoy Ward and Upper Cwmyoy Ward.

== Notable people ==
- John Arnold of Monmouthshire (c.1635-1702), Protestant and MP
- Marina Diamandis (born 1985), pop artist
- Raymond Williams (1921–1988), academic, novelist and critic
