= Usk railway station (Great Western Railway) =

Former railway station in England

Coordinates: 51°42′23″N 2°54′20″W

Usk Station
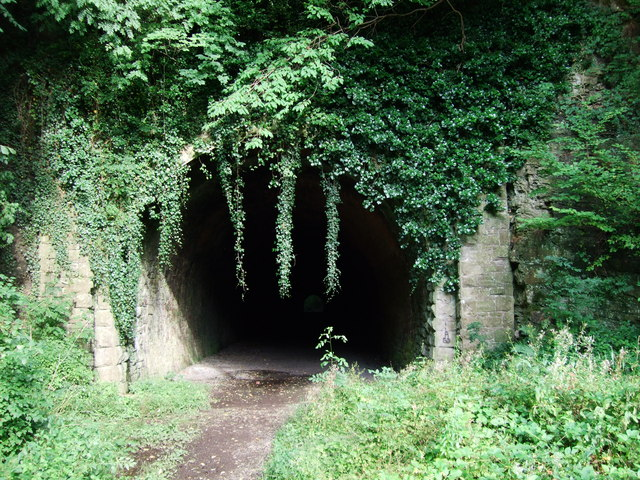
- The railway tunnel near the site of the station in 2008

General information
- Location: Usk, Monmouthshire; Wales
- Platforms: 2

Other information
- Status: Disused

History
- Original company: Coleford, Monmouth, Usk and Pontypool Railway
- Pre-grouping: Great Western Railway

Key dates
- 2 June 1856: Station opened
- 30 May 1955: Station closed
Location

Usk railway station is a disused railway station in the town of Usk, Monmouthshire, South Wales. The station is now barely recognisable with the remains of the platforms beneath undergrowth, but the trackbed, the adjacent Usk Tunnel and road and river bridges remain extant and can be walked.

== The Line ==
The railway was built by the Coleford, Monmouth, Usk and Pontypool Railway in 1856, with the principal aim of carrying iron ore from the Forest of Dean to furnaces near Nantyglo. It was authorised under an Act of Parliament dated 20 August 1853, to operate from a junction with the Newport, Abergavenny & Hereford Railway, near Pontypool, to Coleford, Gloucestershire, with a branch to serve the gas works at Monmouth. Diverging at Little Mill Junction, two miles (3.2 km) north west of Pontypool Road railway station, the line ran to Monmouth Troy railway station.

The four miles (6.4 km) from Little Mill Junction to Usk were opened on 2 June 1856, the line was worked by the Newport, Abergavenny and Hereford Railway. The twelve miles (19 km) onwards to Monmouth Troy opened on 12 October 1857 when the company worked its line with engines hired from the Newport, Abergavenny and Hereford Railway.

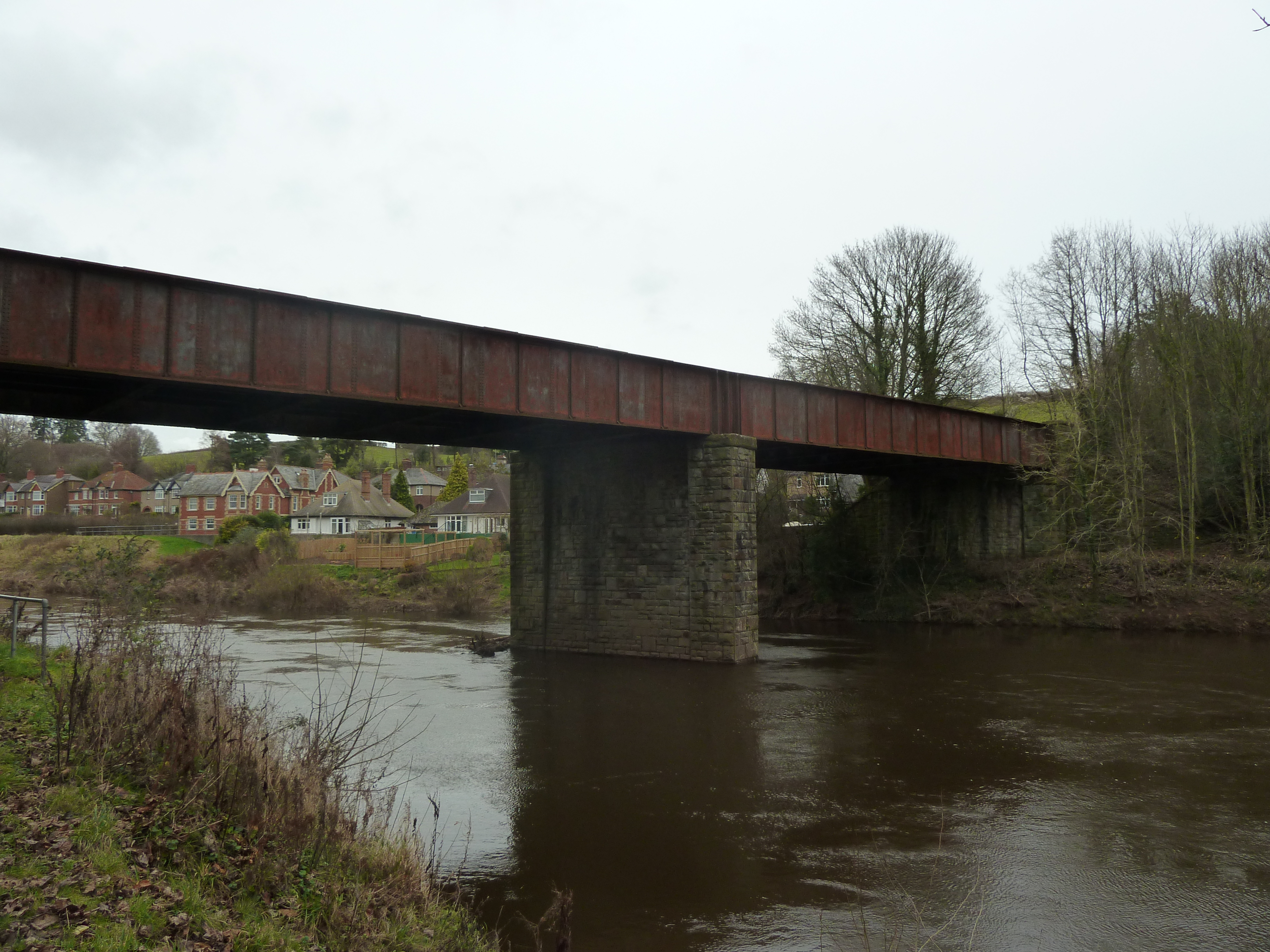
River Usk bridge, now a footpath

Of the several stations on the line only Usk and Monmouth Troy had two platforms. The station site at Usk was cramped between the River Usk and the Tunnel, so the goods yard stood one-quarter of a mile (0.40 km) away on the western side of the river.

From 1940 to 1946, the Little Mill Junction to Glascoed section of the line further west was heavily used to carry shift workers from the Eastern Valleys to the Royal Ordnance Factories' munitions production site's three platform station. Otherwise, passenger traffic was always light, although some attempts were made to revive ailing fortunes with the addition of an evening train from Monmouth and the opening of Elms Bridge Halt in the 1930s. The line was closed to passengers on 30 May 1955. A centenary special train was run on 12 October 1957.

== Usk tunnel ==
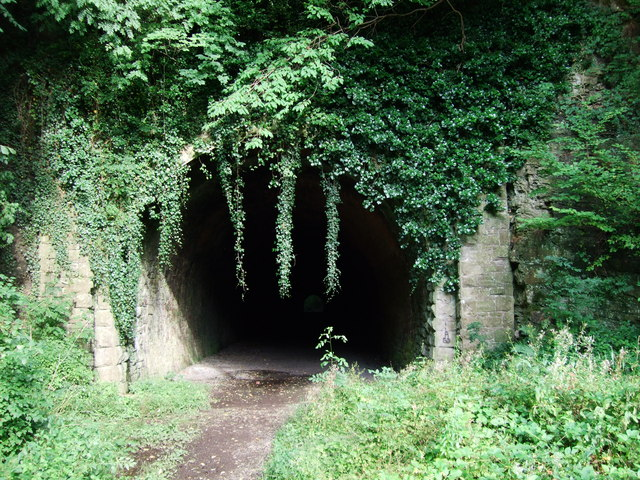
View of the Western portal of Usk Tunnel in 2008

The 256-yard (234 m) tunnel adjacent to the station was cut through the hill immediately to the east of the station. The tunnel was carved through sandstone, from which several fossils were preserved in the National Museum of Wales at Cardiff.

Both tunnel portals are masonry. The eastern one is supported by substantial buttresses. Whilst the roof is bricked-lined, the walls and occasional refuges are a mixture of brick and stone. The profile of the tunnel varies, notably in the centre marked by a pair of strengthening rings.

It is reputed that King Edward VIII slept overnight in the tunnel aboard the Royal Train, possibly on the night of 18 November 1936.

The tunnel is now officially part of a footpath - it is broad, relatively straight and the floor has been raised with infill to ease passage. It is possible to navigate the tunnel without artificial light.

== Timeline ==
- 20 August 1853: Coleford, Monmouth, Usk and Pontypool Railway authorised under the Coleford, Monmouth, Usk & Pontypool Railway Act 1853
- 2 June 1856: railway opened from Little Mill Junction, Pontypool, to Usk.
- 12 October 1857: line extended from Usk to Monmouth (Troy).
- 1861: line leased by the West Midland Railway.
- 1873: Branch to Coleford opened.
- 1887: The Great Western Railway absorbed the Coleford, Monmouth Usk & Pontypool
- 1 January 1917: Coleford branch closed.
- July 1929: Remaining sections of Coleford branch removed.
- 30 May 1955: Coleford Monmouth Usk and Pontypool Railway Newport to Monmouth closed to passengers.
- 24 April 1961: Workers trains cease to serve ROF Glascoed.

Preceding station	Disused railways	Following station
Cefntilla Halt	Great Western Railway; Coleford, Monmouth, Usk and Pontypool Railway	Glascoed Halt
