= Glascoed Halt railway station =

Former railway station in Wales

Coordinates: 51.714101°N 2.960173°W

Glascoed Halt

General information
- Location: Glascoed, Monmouthshire; Wales
- Platforms: 1

Other information
- Status: Disused

History
- Post-grouping: Great Western Railway

Key dates
- 1927: Opened
- May 1955: Closed
Location

Glascoed Halt was a request stop on the former Coleford, Monmouth, Usk and Pontypool Railway. It was opened in 1927 to serve the village of Glascoed, Monmouthshire. It was closed in 1955 following the withdrawal of passenger services on the line. It was located near a small overbridge bridge about 14 miles 48 chains (23.5 km) from Monmouth Troy. The halt consisted of a timber platform and GWR style pagoda.

Twenty chains to the east on the down side a branch to the south led to the rather larger, three platform arrangement installed to serve workers at and visitors to ROF Glascoed. This branch also serviced a large rake of sidings that were only finally decommissioned in 1993 and lifted some years later.

Preceding station	Disused railways	Following station
Usk	Great Western Railway; Coleford, Monmouth, Usk and Pontypool Railway	Little Mill Junction
