= Llandenny railway station =

Former railway station in Wales

Coordinates: 51.7309°N 2.8444°W

Llandenny Station
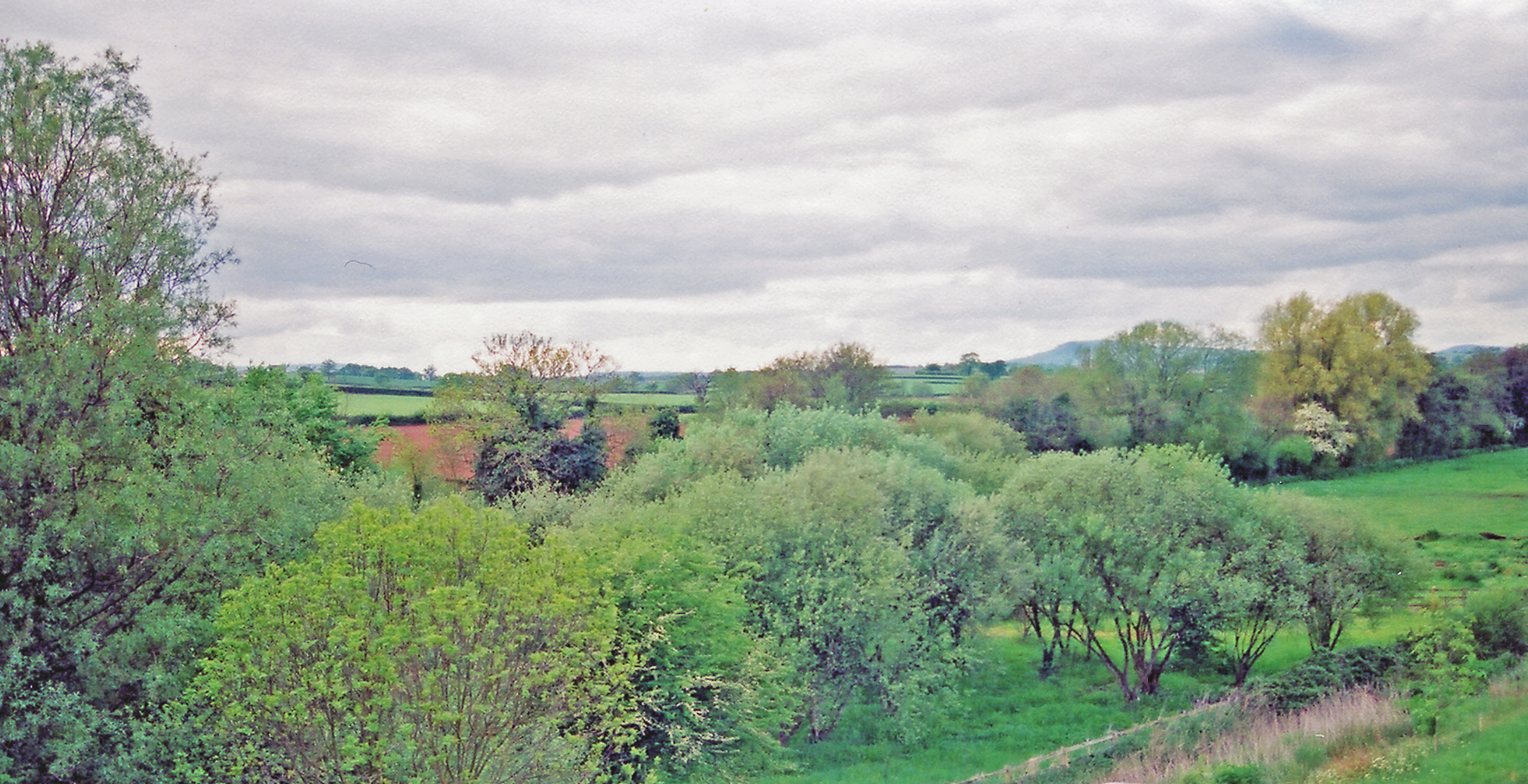
- The site of the station in 2001

General information
- Location: Llandenny, Monmouthshire; Wales
- Platforms: 1

Other information
- Status: Disused

History
- Original company: Coleford, Monmouth, Usk and Pontypool Railway
- Pre-grouping: Great Western Railway

Key dates
- October 1857: Station opened
- May 1955: Station closed
Location

Llandenny Station was a station along the Coleford, Monmouth, Usk and Pontypool Railway. It was built in 1857, during the construction of the line and was located 8 miles 52 chains (13.9 km) from Monmouth Troy station. It was intended to serve the nearby village of Llandenny, but was closed in May 1955, due to a train drivers strike, the line had meant to have been closed in June but because the strike continued past the lines closing date the last service was on 28 May when the national strike began. A couple of special services ran along the track, including a centenary special organised by the Stephenson Locomotive Society in 1957.

== Facilities ==
The station consisted of a single-storey brick station building with a gable roof and single platform, similar to that of Dingestow. The building was built in two stages, the western section was the original and the eastern was a later extension. There was also a single-storey signal box which was constructed in 1892 and was typical of a late Victorian design.

Preceding station	Disused railways	Following station
Raglan Road Crossing Halt	Great Western Railway; Coleford, Monmouth, Usk and Pontypool Railway	Cefntilla Halt
