= Raglan railway station =

Former railway station in Wales

Coordinates: 51.7630°N 2.8400°W

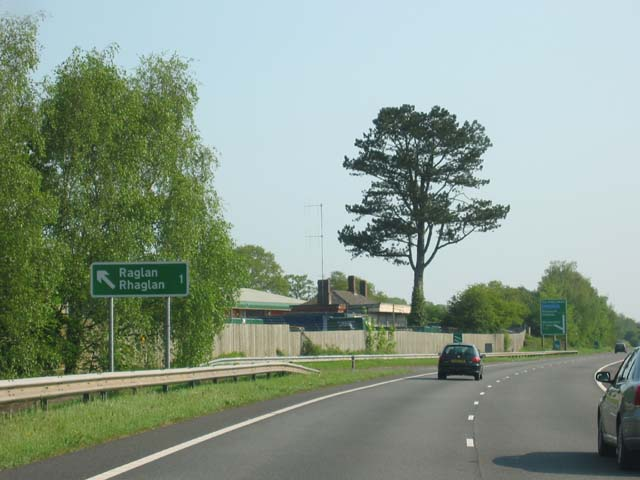
- Remains of station beside the A449 road in 2006. Since dismantled.

General information
- Location: Raglan, Monmouthshire; Wales
- Platforms: 1

Other information
- Status: Disused

History
- Original company: Coleford, Monmouth, Usk and Pontypool Railway
- Pre-grouping: Great Western Railway

Key dates
- July 1876: Station opened
- May 1955: Station closed
- 2013: Station dismantled for rebuilding at St Fagans
Location

Raglan railway station was a station on the Coleford, Monmouth, Usk and Pontypool Railway. It was not opened when the line was originally built, but constructed in 1876 to replace two previous stopping places, Raglan Footpath, a small station which was situated a little further west, and Raglan Road, an unofficial halt which closed in July 1876 and was reopened as 'Raglan Road Crossing Halt' in November 1930 by the Great Western Railway. The station was 6 miles 34 chains (10.3 km) from Monmouth Troy and was intended to improve the railway facilities at the nearby village of Raglan, which was the site a large castle which provided a steady stream of tourist traffic. It was closed in May 1955 due to a train drivers strike and was never reopened though a couple of special services continued to run along the stretch of track over the next few years, including a centenary special organised by the Stephenson Locomotive Society in 1957.

In 2012 the station buildings were transferred to the St Fagans National Museum of History. The museum contains a collection of over 40 re-erected buildings brought from all parts of Wales. As of 2024, the structure remains in storage, pending re-assembly.

== Facilities ==
Though the station provided access to the fair-sized village of Raglan and its castle, traffic figures were quite modest, in the Edwardian era, around 10,000 passenger tickets were issued which steadily declined until its closure; by 1930 only 1,190 tickets were issued. Goods traffic also decreased between 1929 and 1935 by 354 tons but then took a dive downwards and by 1938 goods traffic handled had dropped by 3,458 tons to only 1,511 tons of freight being passed through the station.

The station facilities consisted of little more than a single platform on the up side of the line, a small goods yard which included a little coal wharf and a cattle loading dock. The station was made of red bricks and the design was typical of the GWR at the time, a low-pitched, roof and a small canopy which projected out towards the platform. Raglan also had a small Great Western corrugated pagoda, constructed in 1910 which was used to lock up parcels and other small goods items. By 1912 the station had a small crane which could handle about 4 tons which was shown in the 'Handbook of Stations', published by the Railway Clearing House – although this had gone by the 1930s.

The staff at the station consisted of three until the 1930s when the GWR reduced the staff to two in order to try to make the station profitable.

== Goods Yard ==
The goods yard at Raglan had two goods sidings, one of which was a loop with connections to the main railway line at either end and the other ended at the coal wharf. Both sidings were controlled by ground frames. There were two wharves which were rented to local businesses, the largest of which was used for coal and was approximately 41 square yards (34 m^{2}) it was used by Messrs Davies, Jones & Clench Ltd. The other wharf was about 25 square yards (21 m^{2}) and was mainly used for agricultural purposes.

Preceding station	Disused railways	Following station
Elms Bridge Halt	Great Western Railway; Coleford, Monmouth, Usk and Pontypool Railway	Raglan Footpath

== After closure ==
In the late 1960s much of the route between Usk and Monmouth was used for the new A449 dual carriageway which opened in 1970. The new road ran near to the station, and the yard became a road maintenance depot.

In 2009 the owners of the site, Monmouthshire County Council, proposed offering the station building to St Fagans National Museum of History. The proposal was approved by the council in December, with the museum expressing an interest. The station building may become a static display with track or become an active station for visitors to the museum.

In October 2012 the museum formally accepted the council's offer, and the station was handed over in November. In 2024 the dismantled station was still in storage. A spokesman for the museum stated that the project remains a priority but work will not start until the completion of other projects.
