= Llanbadoc =

Village in Monmouthshire, Wales

Coordinates: 51°41′45″N 2°54′15″W

Llanbadoc: Welsh: Llanbadog Fawr
- Village and community
- Location within Monmouthshire
- Principal area: Monmouthshire
- Country: Wales
- Sovereign state: United Kingdom
- Police: Gwent
- Fire: South Wales
- Ambulance: Welsh
- List of places UK Wales Monmouthshire Map of the community

Llanbadoc (Welsh: Llanbadog Fawr) is a village and community in the county of Monmouthshire and the preserved county of Gwent in Wales. The population of the village at the 2011 census was 806. The total ward population taken at the 2021 census was 1,426.

Llanbadoc sits in the Newport postal district of NP15, just across the River Usk from the town of Usk (Welsh: Brynbuga), with access off the A472. The village falls within the Monmouthshire constituencies of the British House of Commons and the constituency of Sir Fynwy Torfaen for the Senedd.

Despite its small size, Llanbadoc has a quiet but varied character. Its facilities include a parish church, a garage, a saw mill, an open prison and an agricultural college.

The community includes the villages of Monkswood, Little Mill and Glascoed.

== Governance ==
An electoral ward in the same name exists. This ward stretches north from Llanbadoc to Little Mill, Monmouthshire. In May 2022 under the county-wide review by the Local Democracy and Boundary Commission for Wales the village of Little Mill was added to the ward. The total ward population taken at the 2021 census was 1,426. The total ward population taken at the 2011 census was 1,299.

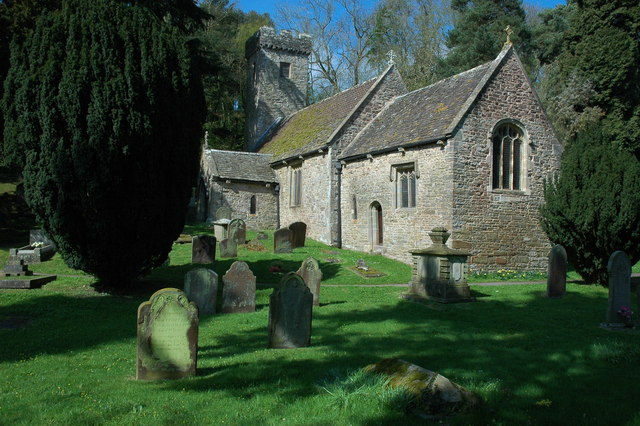
Llanbadoc Church where Alfred Russel Wallace was baptized

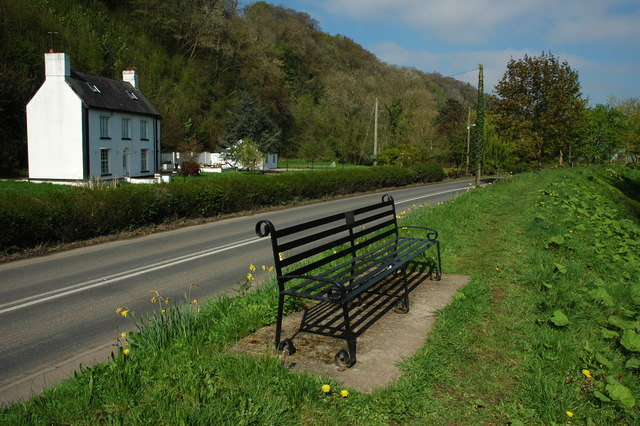
Commemorative seat on the banks of the River Usk

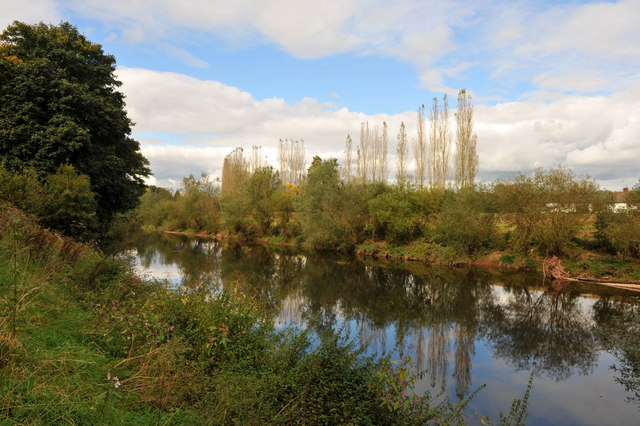
River scene near Llanbadoc

== Notable people ==
- Alfred Russel Wallace, naturalist
- Nicky Wire, bassist for Manic Street Preachers
