= Little Mill Junction railway station =

Disused railway station in Little Mill, Monmouthshire

Coordinates: 51.716710°N 2.991512°W

Little Mill Junction
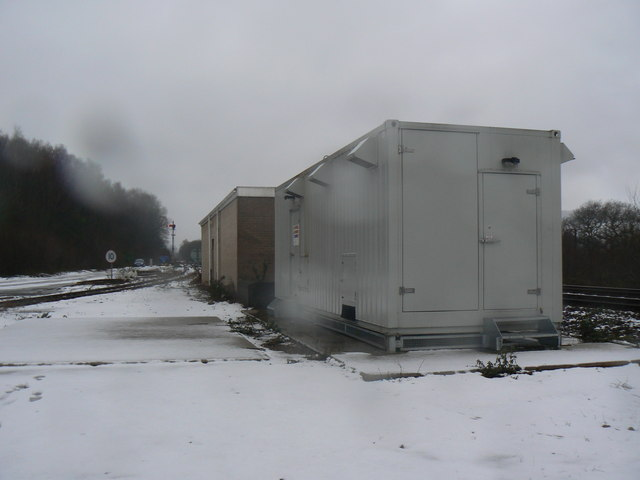
- The site of the station in 2009

General information
- Location: Little Mill, Monmouthshire; Wales
- Platforms: 4

Other information
- Status: Disused

History
- Original company: Coleford, Monmouth, Usk and Pontypool Railway
- Pre-grouping: Great Western Railway

Key dates
- 2 January 1854: Opened as Little Mill
- 1 October 1861: Closed
- 1 May 1883: Reopened
- 1 July 1883: Name changed to Little Mill Junction
- 30 May 1955: Closed
Location

Little Mill Junction was a station on the former Coleford, Monmouth, Usk and Pontypool Railway, located between the main Newport, Abergavenny and Hereford Railway line and the branch to Usk. It served the village of Little Mill, Monmouthshire.

== History ==
The first station was opened on 2 January 1854, and was then modified in 1856 during the construction of the branch line to Usk. It was closed in 1955 following the withdrawal of passenger services on the line. It was located on the junction of the line with the Welsh Marches Line, 16 miles 12 chains (26.0 km) from Monmouth Troy. The station consisted of platforms on both lines, sidings and a station building, although the platforms on the mainline were taken out of use before the station's closure. The station building was demolished, but the signal box and junction remain intact.

| Preceding station | Disused railways | Following station |
|---|---|---|
| Glascoed Halt | Great Western Railway; Coleford, Monmouth, Usk and Pontypool Railway | Pontypool Road |
| Nantyderry | Great Western Railway; Newport, Abergavenny and Hereford Railway; Welsh Marches Line | Pontypool Road |
