= Raglan Road Crossing Halt railway station =

Former railway station in Wales

Coordinates: 51.7444°N 2.8418°W

Raglan Road Crossing Halt

General information
- Location: Raglan, Monmouthshire; Wales
- Platforms: 1

Other information
- Status: Disused

History
- Original company: Coleford, Monmouth, Usk and Pontypool Railway
- Pre-grouping: Great Western Railway

Key dates
- 5 October 1857: Opened as 'Raglan Road'
- 1 July 1876: Closed
- 24 November 1930: Reopened as 'Raglan Road Crossing Halt'
- 30 May 1955: Closed
Location

Raglan Road Crossing Halt Station was a station along the Coleford, Monmouth, Usk and Pontypool Railway near the village of Raglan, Monmouthshire. The first station on the site was Raglan Road, which opened with the line in October 1857 and was closed in 1876 along with Raglan Footpath, with both stations being replaced by Raglan station. Raglan Road Crossing Halt station was opened on the same site in November 1930 and was closed in 1955 along with the rest of the line due to an engine drivers strike. The station was situated 7 miles 59 chains (12.5 km) from Monmouth Troy and about 1 mile (1.6 km) from the new Raglan station. The halt got its name from the nearby level crossing and crossing keeper's cottage on the down side of the line just north of the halt. The halt was of earth and cinder construction, typical of the Great Western Railway.

Preceding station	Disused railways	Following station
Raglan Footpath	Great Western Railway; Coleford, Monmouth, Usk and Pontypool Railway	Llandenny
