= Raglan Footpath railway station =

Former railway station in Wales

Coordinates: 51.7607°N 2.8425°W

Raglan Footpath

General information
- Location: Raglan, Monmouthshire; Wales
- Platforms: 1

Other information
- Status: Disused

History
- Original company: Coleford, Monmouth, Usk and Pontypool Railway
- Pre-grouping: Great Western Railway

Key dates
- 12 October 1857: Opened
- 1 July 1876: Closed
Location

Raglan Footpath was a station on the former Coleford, Monmouth, Usk and Pontypool Railway. It was opened in October 1857 with the rest of the line and located 6 miles 43 chains (10.5 km) from Monmouth Troy. It was intended to serve the village of Raglan, Monmouthshire. It was closed in 1876 along with Raglan Road and replaced by a single station simply called 'Raglan'. The station had a small station house.

Preceding station	Disused railways	Following station
Raglan	Great Western Railway; Coleford, Monmouth, Usk and Pontypool Railway	Raglan Road Crossing Halt
