= Cefntilla Halt railway station =

Former railway station in Wales

Coordinates: 51.7185°N 2.8583°W

Cefntilla Halt

General information
- Location: near Usk, Monmouthshire; Wales
- Platforms: 1

Other information
- Status: Disused

History
- Post-grouping: British Railways

Key dates
- 27 March 1954: Opened
- 28 May 1955: Closed
Location

Cefntilla Halt was a request stop on the former Coleford, Monmouth, Usk and Pontypool Railway. It was opened on 27 March 1954 and was open for less than two years, closing in 1955 when the railway closed. It was not near any particular village but was located near Cefntilla Court, the family seat of the Somerset family, the current holders of the title Baron Raglan and relatives of the House of Beaufort. It was construction was first suggested by FitzRoy Somerset, 4th Baron Raglan to the BR in 1953 to bring needed passenger traffic to the line, which was under threat of closure. It was located about 9 miles 66 chains (15.8 km) from Monmouth Troy. The halt consisted of only a single wooden platform with a length of only 12 feet (3.7 m), a platform lamp and a name-board.

Preceding station	Disused railways	Following station
Llandenny	Great Western Railway; Coleford, Monmouth, Usk and Pontypool Railway	Usk
