= Elms Bridge Halt railway station =

Former railway station in Wales

Coordinates: 51.7705°N 2.8297°W

Elms Bridge Halt

General information
- Location: Raglan, Monmouthshire; Wales
- Platforms: 1

Other information
- Status: Disused

History
- Post-grouping: Great Western Railway

Key dates
- November 1933: Opened
- May 1955: Closed
Location

Elms Bridge Halt was a request stop on the former Coleford, Monmouth, Usk and Pontypool Railway. It was opened on 27 November 1933 to serve the villages near Raglan, Monmouthshire. It was closed in 1955 following the withdrawal of passenger services on the line. It was located in a small cutting near a small road bridge about 5 miles 56 chains (9.2 km) from Monmouth Troy. The halt was of earth and cinder construction, typical of the Great Western Railway.

Preceding station	Disused railways	Following station
Dingestow	Great Western Railway; Coleford, Monmouth, Usk and Pontypool Railway	Raglan
