= Dingestow railway station =

Former railway station in Wales

Coordinates: 51.7848°N 2.7833°W

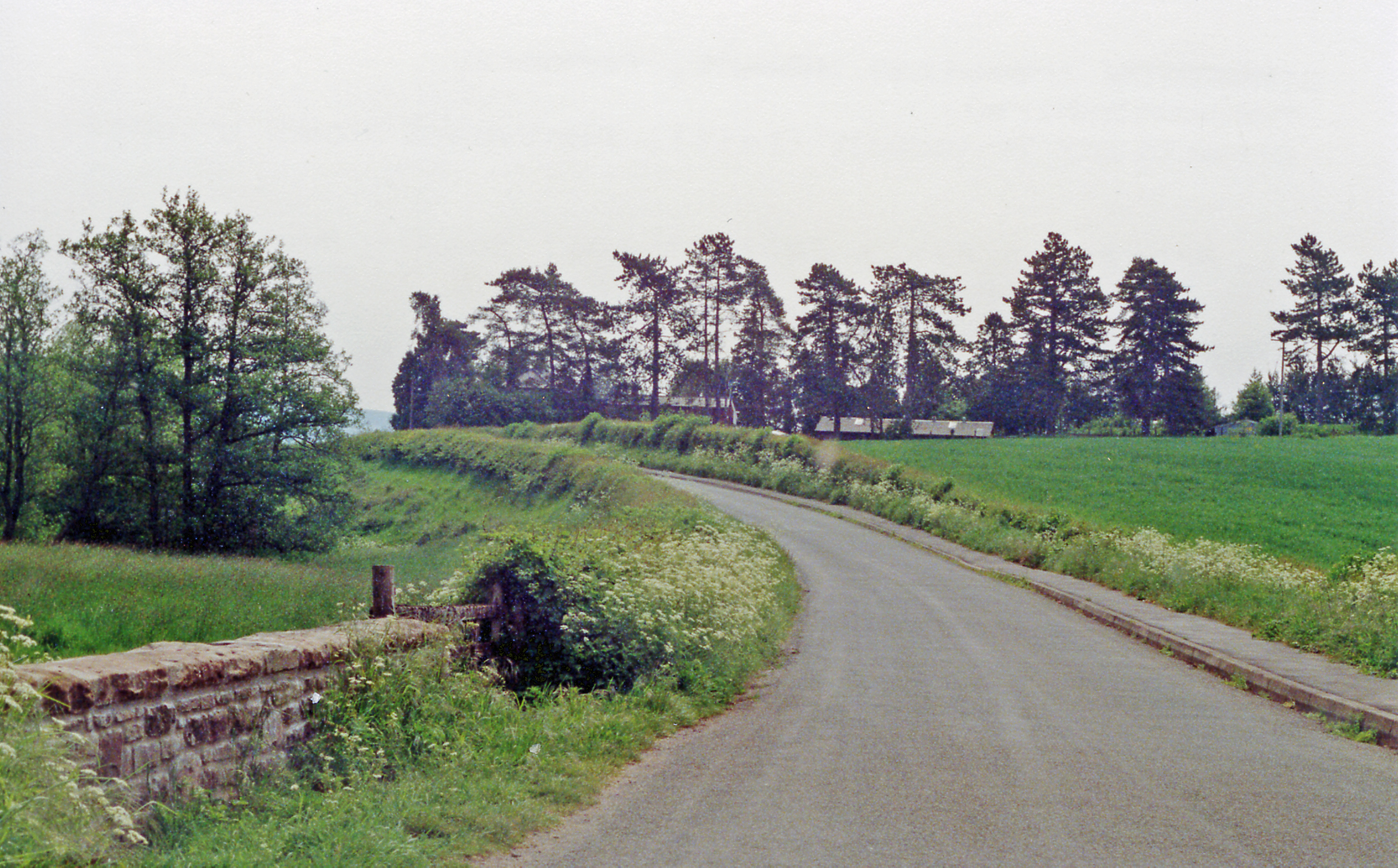
- Site of the station in 1990

General information
- Location: Dingestow, Monmouthshire; Wales
- Platforms: 1

Other information
- Status: Disused

History
- Original company: Coleford, Monmouth, Usk and Pontypool Railway
- Pre-grouping: Great Western Railway

Key dates
- October 1857: Station opened as Dinastow Station
- c. 1870: Renamed Dingestow Station
- May 1955: Station closed
Location

Dingestow Station was a station on the Coleford, Monmouth, Usk and Pontypool Railway. It was built in 1857 during the construction of the line and was located 3 miles and 32 chains from Monmouth Troy. It was intended to serve the nearby village of Dingestow. It was closed in May 1955 due to a drivers' strike.

== Facilities ==
The station consisted of little more than a station building with a small canopy and single platform. The station master's house was situated at the rear of the station. The station had a signal box from 1896 until June 1931 when it was taken out of use and replaced with two ground frames. There was also a cattle loading dock.

Preceding station	Disused railways	Following station
Monmouth Troy	Great Western Railway; Coleford, Monmouth, Usk and Pontypool Railway	Elms Bridge Halt
