= Little Mill, Monmouthshire =

Village in Monmouthshire, Wales

Coordinates: 51.721°N 2.984°W

Little Mill (Welsh: Y Felin Fach) is a village in Monmouthshire, south east Wales, United Kingdom, in the community and ward of Goetre Fawr. It has a population of about 600.

== Location ==
Little Mill is located three miles north east of Pontypool, and three miles west of Usk.

== History and amenities ==
The village derives its name from a watermill that was situated in the village, powered by the Berthin Brook. It comprises mainly ribbon development along the A472 trunk road. Today Little Mill is small and mostly contains Victorian cottages and villas and compact housing developments dating from the 1950s to the present. Half a mile north of the village is Ty Draw, a small residential community that was previously the local reformatory school for boys from 1859 until it closed in 1922.

The village has minimal facilities, comprising a pub, an evangelical church, and a village hall with which several community groups are affiliated. These act as meeting points for locals. The Newport to Hereford railway line runs along its western boundary and until the 1950s had its own station, Little Mill Junction, at the point where the Monmouth branch line joined the main line. Today the nearest stations are Pontypool and New Inn and Cwmbran railway station. The village is in the catchment area for several schools including Usk primary and Goytre Fawr primary schools as well as several comprehensive schools including Caerleon Comprehensive School and King Henry VIII Comprehensive School. Little Mill contains two parks which are known locally as the "pocket park" and "the big park".

During 2013-14 a high-density housing estate was built at the village's eastern edge which involved the demolition of The Sawmill residence in Little Mill, and use of surrounding open areas.
