= Pontypool and New Inn railway station =

Railway station in Torfaen, Wales

Pontypool and New Inn Welsh: Pont-y-Pŵl a'r Dafarn Newydd
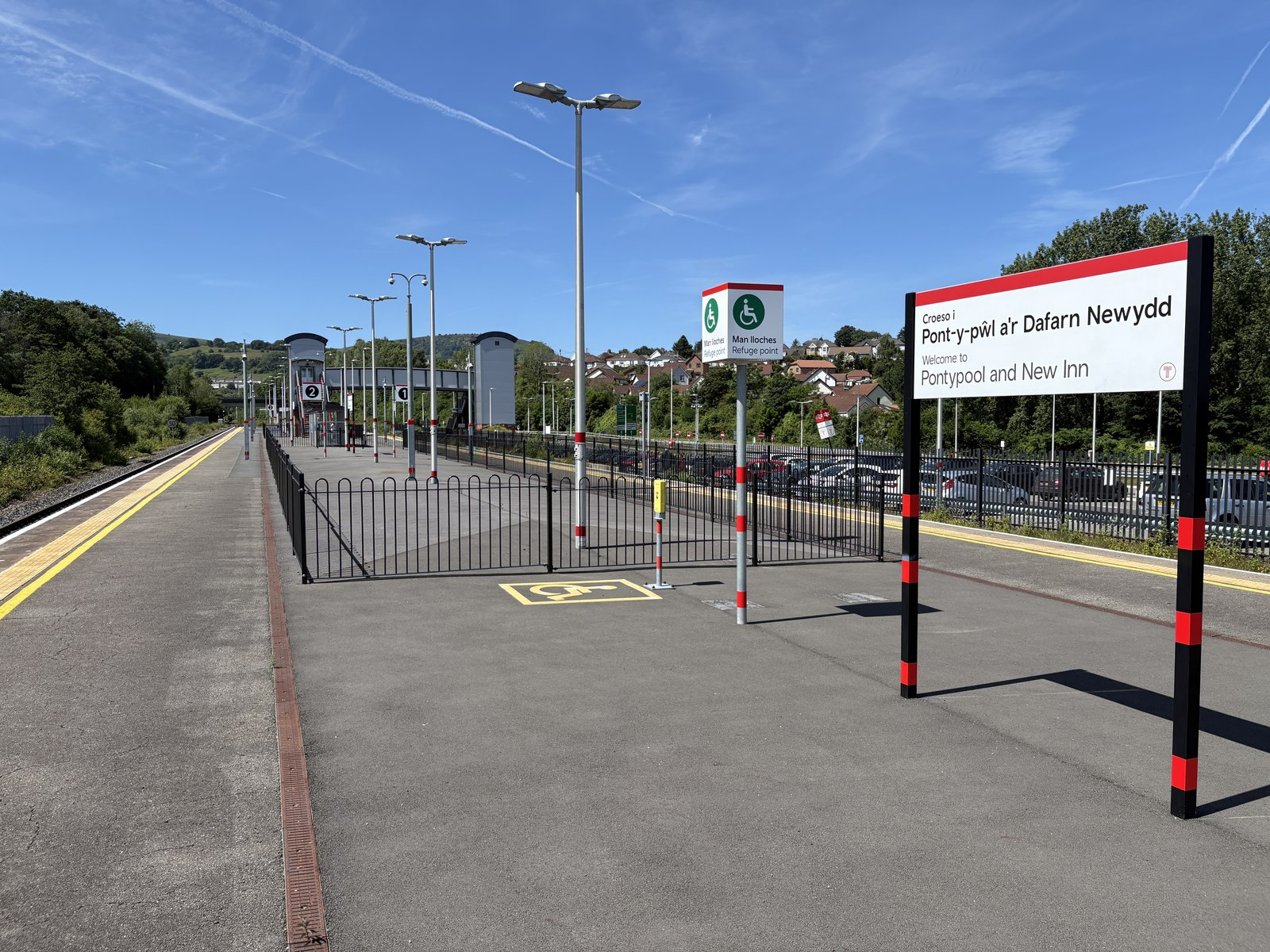

General information
- Location: Pontypool, Torfaen; Wales
- Coordinates: 51°41′51″N 3°00′48″W
- Grid reference: SO300003
- Manager: Transport for Wales
- Platforms: 2

Other information
- Station code: PPL
- Classification: DfT category F1

Key dates
- 1854: Opened as Pontypool Road
- 1972: Renamed Pontypool
- 1 March 1909: resited
- 1994: Renamed Pontypool and New Inn

Passengers
- 2020/21: ▼27,766
- 2021/22: ▲77,550
- 2022/23: ▲0.109 million
- 2023/24: ▲0.121 million
- 2024/25: ▲0.127 million
Location
Notes
- Passenger statistics from the Office of Rail and Road

Pontypool and New Inn railway station (Welsh: Pont-y-Pŵl a'r Dafarn Newydd) is situated to the south east of Pontypool town centre between the town and the suburb of New Inn, Wales. The station was formerly called Pontypool Road until renamed just Pontypool in 1972 and then to the present name in 1994.

It is part of the British railway system owned by Network Rail and is managed by Transport for Wales, who operate all trains serving it. It lies on the Welsh Marches Line from Newport to Crewe.

== History ==
For almost 100 years from the mid 19th century to the early 1960s, Pontypool Road was an important station and key railway junction connecting to the main line from Newport to the Midlands and north of England (via Hereford) and branch lines to Neath and Merthyr. At its height, Pontypool Road featured a 50-line marshalling yard, engine sheds, goods sheds and refuelling facilities.

=== The growth of industry ===
The burgeoning 18th-century iron industry in South Wales followed by the growth of coal mining industry in the 19th century required an extensive transport network. Initially canals were constructed such as the Brecon and Abergavenny Canal (opened 1812) which ran close to the southern part of Pontypool at Pontymoile. The rapid expansion of steam locomotion in the 1840s quickly saw the demise of the canals as the railways offered a faster and more economical transport system.

=== The coming of the railways ===
With industry in the South Wales coalfield needing improved transport links the Monmouthshire Railway and Canal Company (MR&CC) opened the first line between Newport to Pontypool in 1852. The line initially terminated at Crane Street Station in Pontypool and was extended to Blaenavon in 1854.

The Newport, Abergavenny and Hereford Railway (NA&HR) opened a new station in January 1854 just south of the current station. The stationmaster's house and part of a platform are now a private residence. This line now allowed traffic from Hereford to join the MR&CC line at Panteg & Coed-y-Gric Junction and head south towards Newport and its docks. Sponsored by the London and North Western Railway (LNWR), it opened on 6 December 1853. But in 1860 it merged with other railways to form the West Midland Railway which was in turn taken over by the Great Western Railway in 1863.

Although initially named 'Newport Road', the station was by the end of 1854 called 'Pontypool Road' (the addition of Road within the station name is common in railway parlance when the station is situated away from the centre of the town served). The first stationmaster was Henry Griffiths after whom the nearby community of Griffithstown is named. The growth of the railways in the area saw the development of Sebastopol and Griffithstown to house workers. Pontypool Road was also the birthplace of the Associated Society of Locomotive Engineers and Firemen (ASLEF) in 1880. Further railways openings linked Pontypool Road to the Midlands and north of England.

=== Taff Vale Extension Railway (TVE) ===
The Newport, Abergavenny and Hereford Railway (NAHR) also opened the Taff Vale Extension Railway (TVE) in 1857 to link up with the Taff Vale Railway (TVR) at Quakers Yard which connected onto Merthyr Tydfil. A major achievement of this railway was the building of the Crumlin Viaduct over the Ebbw River. The TVE linked directly with the Vale of Neath Railway at Merthyr and further linked Pontypool to Swansea and Neath. The main purpose of this line was the transport of coal across the country.

=== Further development ===
In September 1874 the Pontypool, Caerleon and Newport Railway (PC&NR) opened to goods traffic from Pontypool South Junction to Maindee Junction in Newport. By December 1874 the line was opened from Pontypool North Junction to Panteg Junction. Passenger trains also used the line and run to Newport High Street on the South Wales Railway over the St. Julian's railway bridge.

=== The peak of Pontypool Road ===
Stations and junctions near Pontypool Road railway station in 1909.

By the late 19th century Pontypool Road contained a large rail network of junctions, sidings and sheds forming a large inverted triangle of tracks. Coed-y-Gric Junction of the Hereford line formed the southernmost point. Lines now split to go through Pontypool to the west and to the north via Hereford. Larger engine sheds and buildings were added. Additional sidings were added to cope with the increasing traffic and the marshalling of freight at Pontypool Road.

By the early 20th century the original station at Pontypool was congested, and on 1 March 1909 a larger station was opened just north of it. It comprised a large island platform with two inset bays (one north to Monmouth, one south to join the TVE). A large station building was built with booking office and an underpass to reach the island platform. The new station now catered for the growing passenger numbers.

=== First and Second World Wars ===
Pontypool Road saw an increased activity during both wars. During the First World War, the Grand Fleet (based at Scapa Flow) had to be supplied with, on average, 100,000 tons of coal each week. The coal trains that maintained the supply were called Jellicoe Specials (named after Admiral Jellicoe) and most were marshalled at Pontypool Road before travelling to Grangemouth docks. The Second World War saw again a growth in trains but less coal as the Royal Navy was now generally oil powered. ROF Glascoed munitions and armaments factory was served by the Coleford, Monmouth, Usk and Pontypool Railway which branched from the mainline at Little Mill. Although a major junction, Pontypool was not the target of any German raids during the war.

=== Decline ===
Pontypool had more centrally located stations on branch lines, including Pontypool Blaendare Road, Pontypool Clarence Street and Pontypool Crane Street, but Pontypool Road was by far the biggest. Indeed, at its peak it was one of the busiest junctions in the country.

As the railways went into decline in the 1950s the area was particularly badly hit by closures. The passenger service to Usk and Monmouth was withdrawn in 1955, the local branch line from Newport to Blaenavon was closed in April 1962 and in June 1964 the passenger service to Neath was withdrawn leaving Pontypool Road, as a main-line station, the only one remaining in the area. By the late 1970s the station was down to just 14 passenger trains a day on weekdays. Over the years the situation improved and by 2019 the station saw more than twice that number, but almost half of the passenger trains on the line go through without stopping.

=== Name Changes ===
In 1972 it was renamed to simply Pontypool. The British Railways totem sign for Pontypool Road has been preserved in the nearby Torfaen Museum. The station underwent significant refurbishment in 1994. This involved the demolition of the last surviving major building (that housed the ticket office, offices for railway maintenance personnel and space for a local scout group). The station name was once again changed to the current geographically descriptive name at this time.

Under the station's new owner, Transport for Wales, the station's Welsh name has been changed to Pont-y-Pŵl a'r Dafarn Newydd, from the former Welsh name under Arriva Trains Wales, Pont-y-Pŵl a New Inn. The English name was unchanged.

== Facilities ==
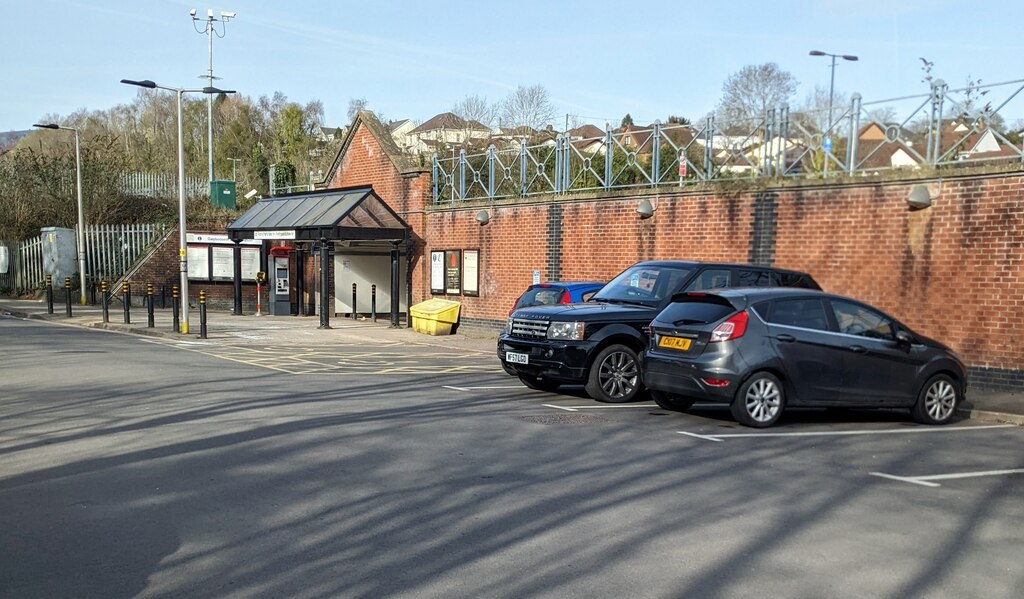
The entrance to the station (2022)

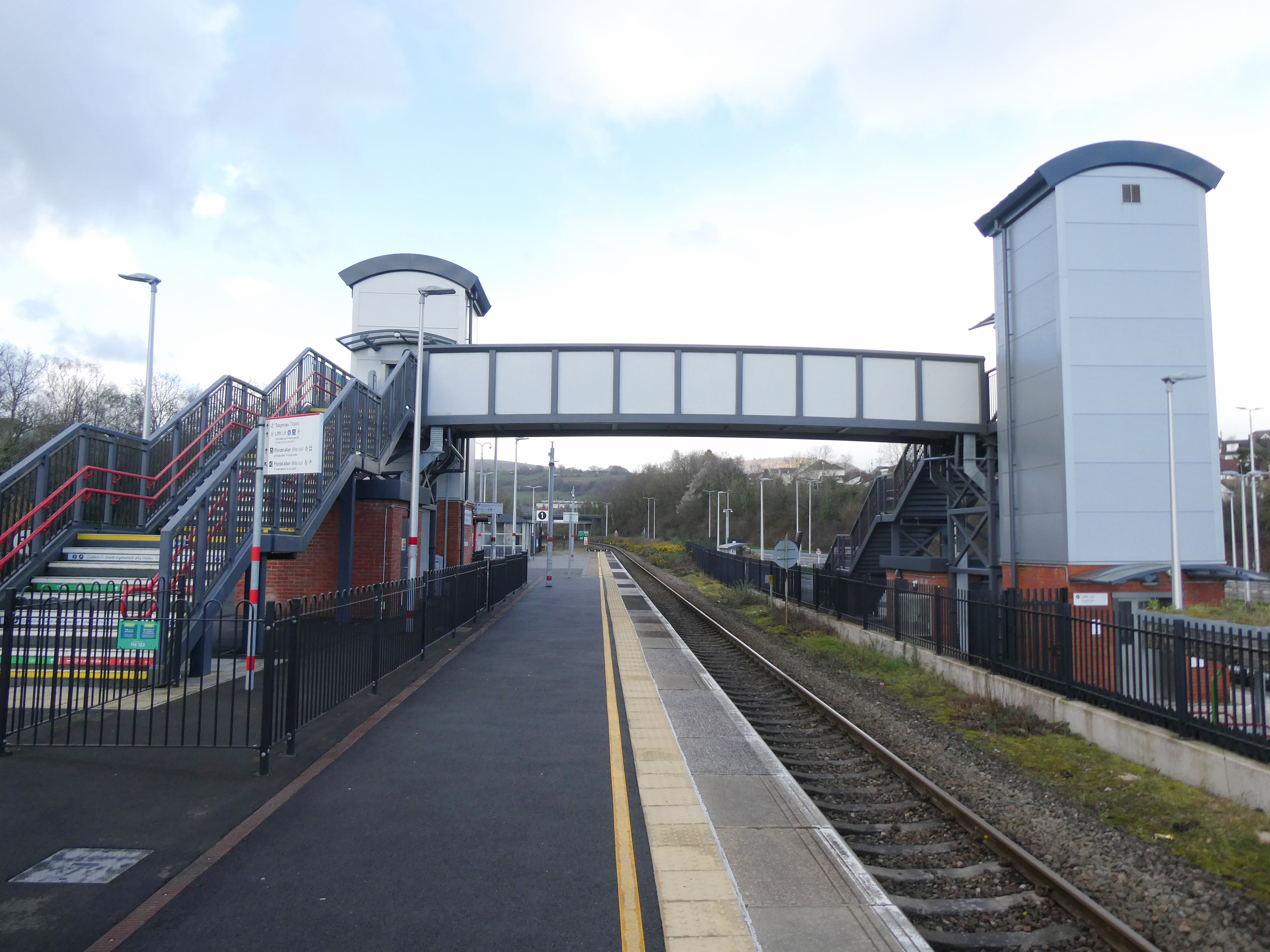
New accessible footbridge (2026)

The station has limited facilities due to its small size today and lack of great commuter use. There is a shelter that serves both sides of the island platform, digital CIS displays, a payphone and a customer help point. Tickets must be bought prior to travel using the ticket machine at the entrance, as the station is unstaffed. There is no level access, as the only means of reaching the platform is via a staircase from the subway passing beneath the tracks en route to/from the main entrance and car park on Station Road.

In 2017, £500,000 refurbishment works were undertaken on the parking area outside the station. With a growth in commuters there was a need to increase the number parking bays. A consultation process was also undertaken to look into the option of opening a larger car park on the opposite side of the current one. The proposal was to utilise vacant scrub land and create a new larger car park that joined the A4042 dual carriageway that runs parallel to the station.

An accessible footbridge with lifts, that is connected to the new park and ride area and station platform, was completed in the summer of 2024 but its opening has been delayed due to some outstanding issues, mainly around platform gradients and drainage. After a planned opening in January 2025 did not materialise, it was eventually opened on 28 February 2025.

== Service ==
On weekdays and Saturdays, there is generally a two hourly service between Holyhead and Cardiff in the middle of the day, with additional peak time services southbound in the mornings and northbound in the evenings for commuters to Newport and Cardiff. These include services between Manchester Piccadilly and West Wales via Crewe and Swansea. From December 2013 the evening northbound Arriva "Premier" service train began to call at Pontypool for the first time. The southbound service in the morning does not call here. On Sundays, an irregular service operates, with 8 trains calling southbound and 10 northbound. These mainly run between Manchester and Cardiff.

Preceding station	National Rail	Following station
Cwmbran	Transport for Wales; Welsh Marches Line	Abergavenny

== Bibliography ==
- Stewart-David, David (2 July 2014). "The role of railways in the First World War". The Railway Magazine. 160 (1, 360). Horncastle, Lincs, UK: Mortons Media. ISSN 0033-8923.
