= Glascoed =

Glascoed: Welsh: Glasgoed
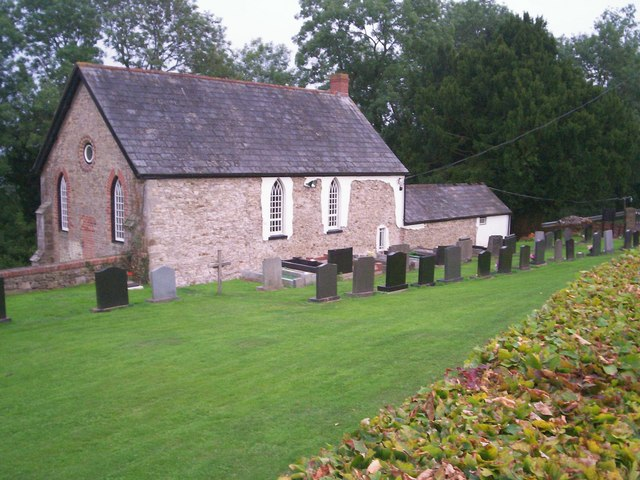
- Mount Zion Baptist Church, Glascoed

- Location within Monmouthshire
- Community: Llanbadoc
- Principal area: Monmouthshire
- Preserved county: Gwent
- Country: Wales
- Sovereign state: United Kingdom
- Post town: PONTYPOOL
- Postcode district: NP4
- Police: Gwent
- Fire: South Wales
- Ambulance: Welsh
- UK Parliament: Monmouthshire

Glascoed (Welsh: Glasgoed) is a village in Monmouthshire, south east Wales. It is 3 miles (4.8 km) east of Pontypool and 3 miles (4.8 km) west of Usk.

Glascoed is mostly associated with the Royal Ordnance Factory nearby at ROF Glascoed. Llandegveth Reservoir is nearby. Its name is derived from the Welsh words "glas" (meaning blue) and "coed" (wood).
