= ROF Glascoed =

Munitions factory in Wales

Coordinates: 51.708899°N 2.942838°W

ROF Glascoed (today BAE Systems Munitions Glascoed) was built as a UK government-owned, Royal Ordnance Factory (ROF). It was designed as one of 20 munitions filling factories. It was planned as a permanent ROF with the intention that, unlike some other similar facilities, it would remain open for production after the end of World War II. After privatisation of the Royal Ordnance Factories in the 1980s it became part of Royal Ordnance plc and later a production unit of BAE Systems.

It was served by the Great Western Railway's Coleford, Monmouth, Usk and Pontypool Railway from its opening in April 1940 until 1993.

== Early history ==
In the late 1930s leading up to the outbreak of war in 1939, the British government developed a strategy to disperse armaments and munitions production away from major cities and the southeast part of England which were felt to be especially vulnerable to bombing from the air. As a result, the Ministry of Supply built a number of Royal Ordnance Factories and satellite factories.

A munitions-filling factory was sited at Glascoed in a valley between Pontypool and Usk in Monmouthshire. The site was chosen for its seclusion and sheltered topography surrounded by hills and its damp micro-climate was suited for the handling of explosives. Mostly agricultural land was acquired by compulsory purchase. In addition, the large workforce needed would benefit a region of the UK hit by particularly heavy unemployment in the 1930s Great Depression.

Officially known as 'ROF 54', the new factory was designed at the Royal Arsenal, Woolwich (Woolwich Arsenal), based on its long experience in munitions production. Safety considerations were paramount. The design, style and spacing of individual production buildings meant that they were separated by wide open spaces as well as approx 20 feet (6.1 m) high grassed embankments and extremely thick reinforced concrete walls and overbridges, called traverses. The purpose of these earthworks was to deflect any explosion skyward rather than outward to any adjacent buildings or structures.

The site was built with extensive underground magazines, comprehensive lightning protection and individual buildings linked by paths, roads and railways.

Building work on the 1,000 acres (4.0 km^{2}) site started in February 1938, with the Ministry of Works acting as agents; and was undertaken by a construction company from Cardiff. The factory was officially opened in April 1940 and full production was achieved in 1941–1942.

== World War II and Korean War activity ==
At its peak, ROF Glascoed boasted nearly 700 separate buildings, each designated for a particular process and used as required. It still has in excess of 10 miles (16 km) of roads, an 8-mile (13-kilometre) perimeter fence and, until more recent years, its own 17 miles (27 km) standard gauge railway system. This included a dedicated passenger station and freight marshalling yards. It was linked to the Great Western Railway (GWR) branch line that ran between Pontypool Road and Monmouth. This rail link enabled the three-times daily movement of up to 13,000 workers in and out of the site as well as the receipt of raw materials and components and the despatch of finished munitions. A small housing estate was built close by to accommodate managers and staff who had to respond quickly in emergencies.

Initially it was intended that ROF Glascoed would produce sea-mines for the Royal Navy. However, as well as these, heavy bombs and pyrotechnics (such as target indicators and skymarkers) were supplied to the RAF. Among the weapons filled by ROF Glascoed were 8,000lb High Capacity bombs ('cookies') for RAF Bomber Command and the Barnes Wallis-designed 'Highball' bouncing bomb, a smaller version of the better-known 'Upkeep' weapons used by RAF 617 squadron to attack the Rhur Valley reservoirs in May 1943.

Contemporary ARP planning was largely based on Stanley Baldwin's assertion that "the bomber will always get through". So, near Glascoed, the local Folly Tower on a hill top at nearby Pontypool was seen as an aiming-off point for the Luftwaffe to attack the ROF factory. The Tower was demolished at the start of the war and not rebuilt until 1994 and has since become a minor tourist attraction. As it was, ROF Glascoed was bombed only twice during the war. On 31 October 1940, a worker was killed and several injured by a lone Heinkel He111P bomber which dropped 12 bombs in daylight but only caused minor damage to the factory. Post-war debriefing records show that the bomber's crew were convinced they had bombed Filton aerodrome in Bristol, some forty miles (64 km) away.

After the war, ROF Glascoed expanded its services to include manufacturing concrete building products and by scrapping surplus munitions. The growing hostility of the Cold War as evidenced by the Korean War also saw a much wider range of munitions filled, assembled and packed at ROF Glascoed. These included munitions for field guns and howitzers, tanks and other fighting vehicles, mortar and aerial bombs, warheads for missiles and torpedoes, flares, pyrotechnics and smoke bombs.

== Post-war survival ==
The Royal Ordnance Factories were part of a government department until they were privatised in 1987. Today Glascoed is operated by BAE Systems Global Combat Systems Munitions. With the closure of other ROFs, Glascoed remains the only ammunition filling facility in the UK and exports its products, as well as supplying the British Ministry of Defence (MoD). Glascoed now employs about 400 people and has invested heavily in R&D and improved production facilities.

In recent years, Glascoed has developed an expertise with Insensitive Munitions in artillery shells and other warheads. These employ PBX compositions such as Rowanex 3601 (booster) and Rowanex 1100 (main charge) designed to minimise the risk of accidents e.g. inadvertent detonation by dropping, heat, friction or impact. One such accident occurred on the USS Forrestal in 1967.

Until the mid-1990s, in the interests of security, British Ordnance Survey maps omitted the details of all operational ROF sites; the maps showed the sites as they existed before the ROFs' construction, although it was sometimes possible to identify the site boundaries. More recent editions show the detail of the buildings, internal roads, and rail links, labelled simply as "Depot" or "Works".

On the 20 August 2008 the Ministry of Defence (United Kingdom) announced a 15-year £2bn contract with BAE Systems to supply British forces with medium calibre and small arms ammunition.

On 17 April 2024 emergency services were called to the site after an explosion. BAE Systems said that safety protocols were "immediately enacted" and emergency services attended the site. A spokeswoman said no one had been injured, there was no risk to local residents and production was unaffected. The exact cause of the incident was still under investigation.

A new factory for BAE Systems is expected to come into service in 2026, providing a 16-fold increase in British artillery shell manufacturing capacity. The factory is heavily automated so is not expected to create new jobs.

== See also ==
- Royal Ordnance
