= Coleford, Monmouth, Usk and Pontypool Railway =

Railway in Monmouthshire, Wales

Coleford, Monmouth, Usk & Pontypool Railway
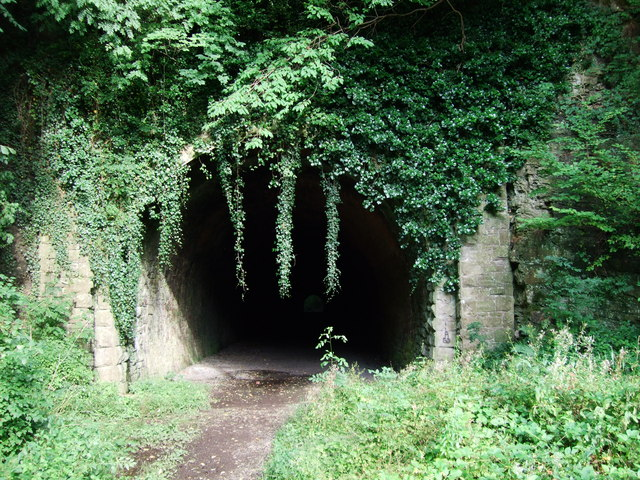
- The 256-yard Usk Tunnel in 2008, now a public footpath.

Overview
- Locale: Monmouthshire
- Dates of operation: 1856–1955 (section to ROF Glascoed remained open until 1993)

Technical
- Track gauge: 4 ft 8 1/2 in (1,435 mm) standard gauge
- Length: 16 miles (26 km)

The Coleford, Monmouth, Usk & Pontypool Railway (CMU&PR) was a standard gauge railway of 16 miles (26 km) which ran from Monmouth to Little Mill, near Pontypool in Monmouthshire, Wales. It was intended to convey the mineral products of the Forest of Dean to the ironworks of South Wales, by connecting to the Newport, Abergavenny and Hereford Railway at Little Mill Junction. The NAHR made the onward connection over its Taff Vale Extension line. The CMU&PR intended to acquire the Monmouth Railway, actually a horse-operated plateway, and convert it to locomotive operation.

The CMU&PR completed its own line from Little Mill to Monmouth, but financial difficulties forced a halt there. The company decided against conversion of the Monmouth Railway, and in 1861 built a connecting line from its Monmouth station to an interchange wharf at Wyesham, leaving the Monmouth Railway unaltered.

The mineral traffic was not as lucrative as had been hoped, and the company struggled financially, and in 1861 leased its line to the West Midland Railway, which had been formed by the merger of the Newport, Abergavenny and Hereford Railway with other lines, and the West Midland Company itself soon amalgamated with the Great Western Railway, taking the CMU&PR lease with it.

The line was never busy, and passenger services were withdrawn in 1955. A limited goods service was retained for a period at Usk, and it was only the Royal Ordnance Factory at Glascoed that kept part of the CMU&PR system in operation until complete closure in 1993.

== History ==
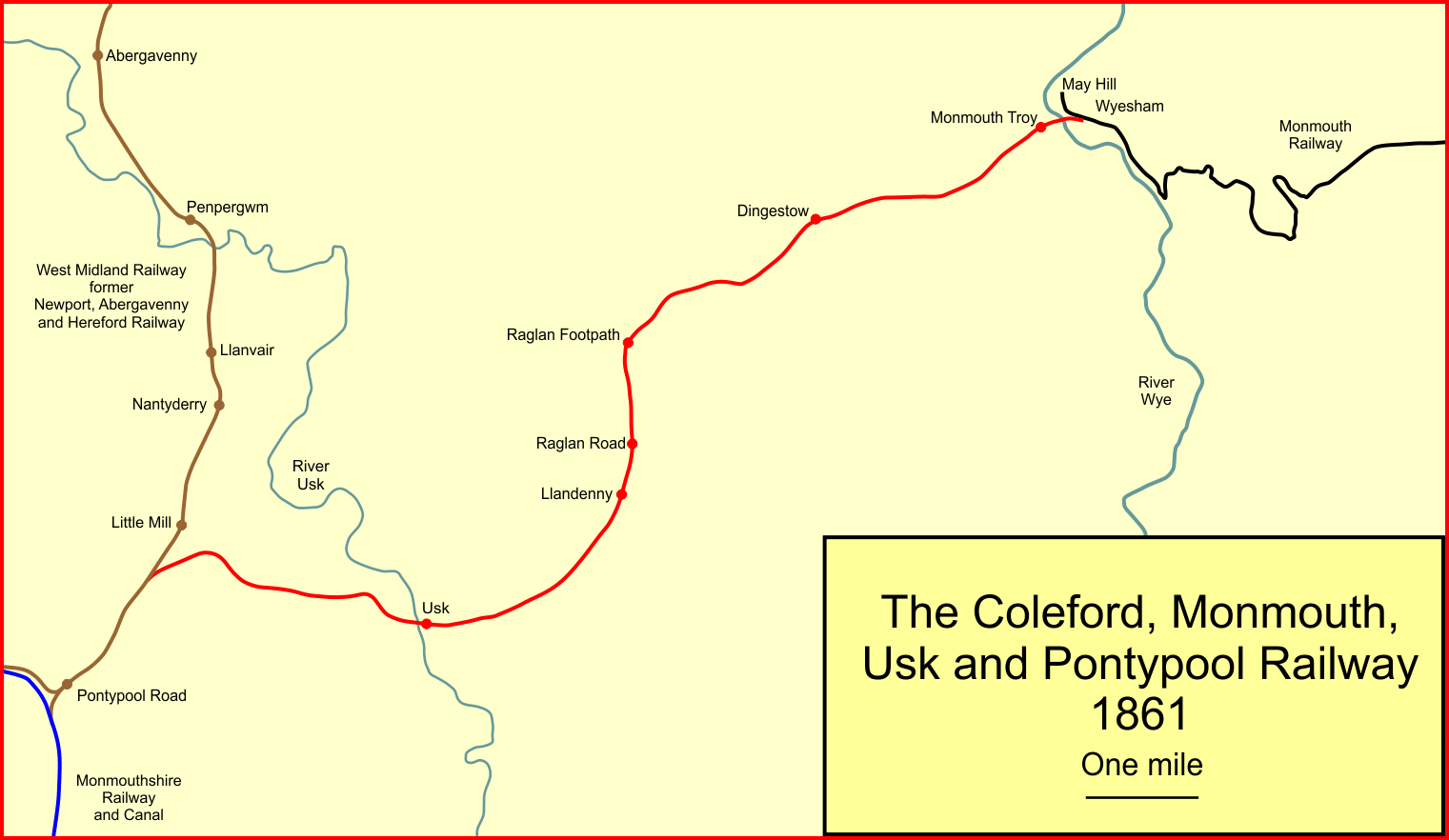
System map of the Coleford, Monmouth, Usk and Pontypool Railway

On 2 January 1854 the Newport, Abergavenny and Hereford Railway opened its main line. It was a north–south trunk route from Hereford, in fact connecting with the Monmouthshire Railway and Canal Company near Pontypool for the final approach to Newport. (Note: The Monmouthshire Railway ran from the Pontypool area to Newport, and it should not be confused with the Monmouth Railway, which was a plateway connecting Monmouth with iron and coal pits east of Coleford in the Forest of Dean.) It was observed that an extensive and productive agricultural region lay nearby, east of the NA&HR route and the idea formed that a line from Monmouth through Raglan and Usk would be advantageous.

Building on that notion, attention was drawn to Coleford, considered one of the most important mineral-producing locations in the Forest of Dean. A railway line connecting Coleford through Monmouth to Pontypool would be able to convey iron ore and coal to the smelters of South Wales, specifically to Nantyglo. The ironmaster Crawshay Bailey was a prime mover in bringing the idea to fruition; it took shape as the Coleford, Monmouth, Usk and Pontypool Railway.

The proposed railway would, it was claimed, offer the most direct route for the lucrative coal traffic between South Wales and London. The line could form a junction with the Newport, Abergavenny and Hereford Railway near Little Mill, two miles north of Pontypool Road station.

Coleford already had a railway connection: the Monmouth Railway had joined it to some scattered pits to the east of the town, and connected to a terminus at May Hill, near Monmouth. However the Monmouth Railway was a 3ft 6in gauge horse-operated plateway, and by the 1850s it was technologically obsolescent and commercially moribund. The new railway would acquire the Coleford Railway and use some of the trackbed for its own new line.

== Authorisation and construction ==
Coleford, Monmouth, Usk and Pontypool Railway Act 1853
- Act of Parliament
- Parliament of the United Kingdom
- Long title: An Act for making a Railway from the Newport, Abergavenny, and Hereford Railway in the Parish of Llanvihangel Pontymoyle in the County of Monmouth to Coleford in the County of Gloucester, with a Branch to the Monmouth Gasworks; and for other Purposes.
- Citation: 16 & 17 Vict. c. ccxvii

Dates
- Royal assent: 20 August 1853

Text of statute as originally enacted

The Coleford, Monmouth, Usk and Pontypool Railway Act 1853 (16 & 17 Vict. c. ccxvii) secured royal assent on 20 August 1853. The railway was to be 22 miles in length, and there was to be a branch at Dixton to give access to Monmouth Gas Works (though this was never built). The estimated cost of construction was £160,000.

At the first company meeting later in 1853, the chairman stated that construction would be complete by 1 December 1854. Double track would be provided as necessary, no doubt because of the heavy traffic flows foreseen at this stage, in its role as a hoped-for through trunk route.

Construction of the line at the western end from Usk to Little Mill was comparatively simple in engineering terms; the December 1854 forecast was long forgotten, but the line from Usk to Little Mill opened for traffic on 2 June 1856. The Newport, Abergavenny and Hereford Railway worked the line.

The eastern section posed more problems, with tunnels at Usk and Monmouth, and a large river bridge at Monmouth. Nevertheless, on 12 October 1857 the line was complete as far as the Troy station at Monmouth. From that date the company worked its own trains, using two locomotives hired in from the Newport, Abergavenny and Hereford Railway. The line was single track, with intermediate stations at Usk, Llandenny and Dingestow. The tunnels had been built for double track. There was a "small junction station" at Little Mill, and at Raglan trains stopped at a place called Raglan Footpath "from an early date"; they also called at Raglan Road level crossing. (Note: Jenkins, page 31, says: "At Monmouth, the railway terminated in a small station on the east side of the River Wye at Troy House." Troy House is on the west side of the Wye and so was the Troy station.)

The CMU&PR now took stock of the situation; continuing to Coleford would involve converting the Monmouth Railway by relaying the track (which was a plateway), and enlarging its tunnel. After much consideration the company decided to cross the River Wye—in itself an expensive operation—and form an interchange point at Wyesham Wharf. The Monmouth Railway would continue in operation as a plateway, and minerals brought to Wyesham would be transshipped there to wagons on the CMU&PR. This arrangement was completed on 1 July 1861.

The portion of the Monmouth Railway from Coleford to Monmouth (May Hill) was acquired by the CMU&PR in anticipation of the conversion. When it was decided to leave the line unconverted, it continued to operate under its own management, although owned by the CMU&PR. It exchanged mineral traffic from the pits east of Coleford with the CMU&PR at Wyesham.

== West Midland Railway ==
Coleford, Monmouth, Usk and Pontypool (Lease, &c.) Act 1861
- Act of Parliament
- Parliament of the United Kingdom
- Long title: An Act for enabling the Coleford, Monmouth, Usk, and Pontypool Railway Company to lease their Undertaking to the West Midland Railway Company; and for other Purposes.
- Citation: 24 & 25 Vict. c. cxcvii

Dates
- Royal assent: 22 July 1861

The Newport, Abergavenny and Hereford Railway had joined forces with the Oxford, Worcester and Wolverhampton Railway and the uncompleted Worcester and Hereford Railway, in forming a through route to the industrial areas of the West Midlands. It was decided to amalgamate, and on 1 July 1860 the West Midland Railway Act 1860 (23 & 24 Vict. c. lxxxi) was passed forming the West Midland Railway from the three companies. The West Midland Railway was now a formidable player in railway politics, having access at its southern and northern ends to mineral resources and to industrial areas requiring those resources. It was a natural sponsor for the Coleford, Monmouth, Usk and Pontypool railway, and the smaller concern was leased to the West Midland Railway under the Coleford, Monmouth, Usk and Pontypool (Lease, &c.) Act 1861 (24 & 25 Vict. c. cxcvii) passed on 22 July. It was effective from 1 July 1861. The first year lease charge was £4,680 but that rose progressively, and from the tenth year was to be £10,764.

In 1863 the West Midland Railway was amalgamated with the Great Western Railway, and the lease of the CMU&PR was adopted by the GWR.

== Other railways at Monmouth ==
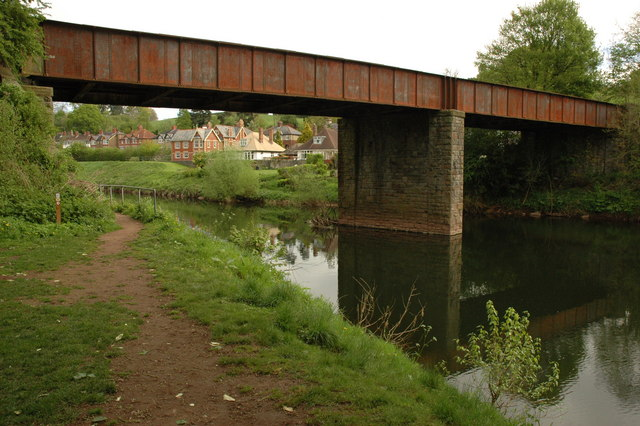
Disused railway bridge at Usk over the River Usk.

Monmouth Troy station became the focus for other, later railways at Monmouth.

=== Ross and Monmouth Railway ===
The Hereford, Ross and Gloucester Railway opened its line on 15 June 1855, connecting Ross-on-Wye with Gloucester and the Great Western Railway network. This was considered an important step in improving the local economy, and as Ross-on-Wye was only 8 miles from Monmouth, it appeared a natural initiative to connect the two towns by a railway. Local business people promoted a scheme and it became the Ross and Monmouth Railway, opening from Ross-on-Wye to May Hill station at Monmouth on 4 August 1873. May Hill was at first intended as a temporary station only, while the Ross and Monmouth company completed a bridge over the River Wye. When this was ready, the line was extended to enter the CMU&PR station, Troy, on 1 May 1874. May Hill station was more convenient for Monmouth town centre than Troy and was retained.

=== Wye Valley Railway ===
Local interests put forward the idea of a railway following the lower Wye Valley, and connecting Monmouth to Chepstow, on the River Severn. A scheme was authorised by the Wye Valley Railway Act 1866 (29 & 30 Vict. c. ccclvii), but the financial crisis frustrated the intentions of proceeding with construction for several years. The Wye Valley Railway Company opened its line on 1 November 1876. At Monmouth it joined the CMU&PR at Wyesham, crossing the Wye by the CMU&PR bridge; trains continued to the Troy station. The Wye Valley Railway was leased to, and worked by the GWR.

=== Coleford Railway ===
The alignment of the Coleford, Monmouth, Usk and Pontypool Railway and the Ross and Monmouth Railway encouraged speculators to plan new through routes from the industrial areas of South Wales to the corresponding areas of the Midlands, and in 1863 the Worcester, Dean Forest and Monmouth Railway was promoted. This company was to adopt the Monmouth Railway and upgrade it to main line railway standards, and extend north-eastwards through the Forest of Dean to Newent, continuing to join the Worcester and Hereford line at Great Malvern. The Worcester, Dean Forest, and Monmouth Railway Act 1863 (26 & 27 Vict. c. clxxxv) and the Worcester, Dean Forest and Monmouth Railway (Extension to Gloucester) Act 1864 (27 & 28 Vict. c. ccxcv) authorised the undertaking. This moderately long new line gained considerable support, but the financial depression following the failure of the banking firm of Overend, Gurney and Company in 1866 resulted in a complete inability to raise money for railway schemes, and in 1868 the project was reduced to construction between Monmouth and Coleford only. The scheme was renamed the Coleford Railway. It purchased the Monmouth Railway and built its line in part on the formation of the Monmouth line, although the sharp curves that were acceptable for tramroad operation had to be smoothed out.

The Coleford Railway joined the Wye Valley Railway at Wyesham Junction, a little east of the River Wye at Monmouth. It opened on 1 September 1883, and trains ran through to the Troy station.

== Absorbed by the Great Western Railway ==
The CMU&PR was leased to the GWR and worked by it, and in time it was clear that the nominal independence achieved nothing. Negotiations were opened with the GWR with a view to absorption by that company, and this took effect from 1 January 1887. The arrangement had been authorised by the Great Western Railway Act 1881 (44 & 45 Vict. c. ccviii).

== Train service ==
For many years the train service had consisted of four or five passenger trains each way; generally these ran through from Ross to Pontypool Road.

After 1918 the GWR introduced auto-trains on the line, and through running across Monmouth was largely discontinued. A Sunday service was introduced by 1938. Although May Hill station at Monmouth was recognised as being much more convenient for the town centre, trains from Pontypool Road to Monmouth did not continue to that point, even though auto-trains could easily have reversed there and returned to Troy. (After nationalisation some services made this move for schoolchildren.) One, or later two, goods trains daily sufficed on the line, and there was comparatively little long-distance traffic.

== Royal Ordnance Factory Glascoed ==
As part of the country's preparation for war, in 1938 a Royal Ordnance Factory was established at Glascoed, between Little Mill and Usk. Construction workers were conveyed to the location by railway, and it opened as ROF Glascoed on 6 October 1940.

== Decline and closure ==
In 1953 British Railways, as successor to the Great Western Railway, made it clear that closure of the passenger service was being considered. Public opinion generated considerable opposition, and it as agreed that a six-month trial of an enhanced service would be made. 11 trains were run in each direction, and a range of cheap through tickets were offered. On 14 June 1954 a new halt was opened, at Cefntilla. The platform was less than 16 feet in length, with no ramps, and only a nameboard a safety rail, and a solitary lamp. However the trial demonstrated that little stimulus had been given to passenger business, and from 7 February 1955 the train service reverted to the former level of frequency.

British Railways announced now that the passenger service was to be discontinued, and politicians locally accused them of providing too frequent a train service during the trial period. Nevertheless, it was announced that the passenger service would be discontinued on 13 June 1955. A national strike was called by the Associated Society of Locomotive Engineers and Firemen (ASLEF) from 28 May 1955, effective until after the intended closure date of the service. No trains actually ran from the first day of the strike.

The section of route between Little Mill and Usk was retained for goods trains.

On 12 October 1957 a special train arranged by the Stephenson Locomotive Society was run over the entire line, on which the track was still serviceable.

ROF Glascoed continued to be served by rail until 1993.

== Station list ==
- Wyesham Junction; connection with Wye Valley Railway and (later) Coleford Railway;
- Monmouth Troy; opened October 1857; closed 5 January 1959;
- Dingestow; opened October 1857; closed 30 May 1955;
- Elms Bridge Halt; opened 27 November 1933; closed 30 May 1955;
- Raglan; opened 1 July 1876; closed 30 May 1955;
- Raglan Footpath; opened October 1857; closed October 1876;
- Raglan Road; opened October 1857; closed 1 July 1876; reopened as Raglan Road Crossing 24 November 1930; closed 30 May 1955;
- Llandenny; opened October 1857; closed 30 May 1955;
- Cefntilla Halt; opened 14 June 1954; closed 30 May 1955;
- Usk; opened 2 June 1856; closed 30 May 1955;
- Glascoed East Access; opened 3 January 1941 or 3 January 1943; closed by June 1954; unadvertised station for ROF workers only;
- Wern Hir Halt; opened January 1939; closed June 1941; unadvertised station for ROF workers only;
- Glascoed Factory West Access Halt; opened 12 June 1941; renamed Glascoed Crossing Halt; closed ?; unadvertised station for ROF workers only;
- Glascoed Halt; opened 16 May 1927; closed 30 May 1955; continued in use by Royal Ordnance Factory workers until 13 October 1957; unadvertised station for ROF workers only;
- Glascoed Royal Ordnance Factory; opened 6 October 1940; closed 24 April 1961; on spur south of through line; unadvertised station for ROF workers only;
- Glascoed Factory or Glascoed West Access; opened 12 June 1941; closed after 1954; unadvertised station for ROF workers only;
- Little Mill; opened 2 June 1854; closed 1 July 1861; (Note: The first station was on the NA&HR some distance north of the point of junction) reopened as Little Mill Junction 1 May 1883 on Usk line only; closed 30 May 1955.
