= List of standardised Welsh place-names in Torfaen =

Location of the County Borough of Torfaen in Wales.

The list of standardised Welsh place-names, for places in Torfaen, is a list compiled by the Welsh Language Commissioner to recommend the standardisation of the spelling of Welsh place-names, particularly in the Welsh language and when multiple forms are used, although some place-names in English were also recommended to be matched with the Welsh. The list contains 58 entries in November 2023, although the official October 2026 list had 54.

The list is based on recommendations provided by the Place-names Standardisation Panel, convened by the Commissioner, for expert advice on the standardisation of Welsh place-names. The panel bases their decisions on a set of guidelines (currently dating to June 2023), specific to Welsh settlement names (such as those of villages, towns, and cities) and topographic features (such as lakes, mountains and rivers). The panel does not cover house or building names, although similar principles could be applied to them or to names for new developments (for which the Commissioner offers their own advice to local authorities and housing developers). The panel may also have used additional guidelines.

The list was first published in 2018, and took years to put together. Upon creation, these lists were published under the Open Government Licence 3.0.

In October 2026, Torfaen County Borough Council and the commissioner agreed on a new list of 54 official names.

== List ==
=== November 2023 ===
Recommended standardised names		Other name/spelling not recommended	Type	Grid reference
Welsh	English	Other name/spelling not recommended	Type	Grid reference
Abersychan	Abersychan		Settlement	SO2603
Blaenafon	Blaenafon	Blaenavon	Settlement	SO2509
British	British		Settlement	SO2503
Castell-y-bwch	Castell-y-bwch		Settlement	ST2792
Cefn-crib	Cefn-crib		Settlement	ST2399
Coedcae	Coedcae		Settlement	SO2608
Croesyceiliog	Croesyceiliog		Settlement	ST3096
Croesymwyalch	Croesymwyalch		Settlement	ST3092
Cwmafon	Cwmafon	Cwmavon	Settlement	SO2706
Cwmbrân	Cwmbrân	Cwmbran	Settlement	ST2995
Cwmbrân Uchaf	Upper Cwmbrân	Upper Cwmbran	Settlement	ST2796
Cwm-ffrwd-oer	Cwm-ffrwd-oer		Settlement	SO2601
Cwm-ynys-cou	Cwm-ynys-cou	Cwmynyscoy	Settlement	ST2899
Fairwater	Fairwater		Settlement	ST2794
Y Farteg	Varteg		Settlement	SO2605
Forgeside	Forgeside	Forge Side	Settlement	SO2408
Gallowsgreen	Gallowsgreen		Settlement	SO2606
Garndiffaith	Garndiffaith		Settlement	SO2604
Garnyrerw	Garnyrerw	Garn-yr-erw	Settlement	SO2310
Golynos	Golynos		Settlement	SO2504
Greenmeadow	Greenmeadow		Settlement	ST2795
Griffithstown	Griffithstown		Settlement	ST2999
Henllys	Henllys		Settlement	ST2693
Hollybush	Hollybush		Settlement	ST2893
Llanfihangel Pont-y-moel	Llanfihangel Pont-y-moel		Settlement	SO3001
Llanfrechfa	Llanfrechfa		Settlement	ST3193
Llantarnam	Llantarnam		Settlement	ST3093
Llanyrafon	Llanyrafon		Settlement	ST3094
Lowlands	Lowlands		Settlement	ST2996
Northville	Northville		Settlement	ST2996
Oakfield	Oakfield		Settlement	ST2993
Old Furnace	Old Furnace		Settlement	SO2600
Pant-teg	Pant-teg	Panteg	Settlement	ST3199
Pantygaseg	Pantygaseg		Settlement	ST2599
Pentrepiod	Pentrepiod		Settlement	SO2602
Pen-twyn	Pen-twyn	Pentwyn	Settlement	SO2603
Pen-y-garn	Pen-y-garn	Penygarn	Settlement	SO2801
Penyrheol	Penyrheol		Settlement	ST2899
Pont-hir	Pont-hir	Ponthir	Settlement	ST3292
Pontnewydd	Pontnewydd		Settlement	ST2996
Pontnewynydd	Pontnewynydd		Settlement	SO2701
Pont-rhyd-yr-ynn	Pont-rhyd-yr-ynn		Settlement	ST2997
Pontyfelin	Pontyfelin		Settlement	ST3098
Pont-y-moel	Pont-y-moel	Pontymoile	Settlement	SO2900
Pont-y-pŵl	Pontypool		Settlement	SO2800
Ras Isaf	Lower Race		Settlement	SO2700
Ras Uchaf	Upper Race		Settlement	ST2799
Sebastopol	Sebastopol		Settlement	ST2898
Snatchwood	Snatchwood		Settlement	SO2602
Southville	Southville		Settlement	ST2995
St Dials	St Dials		Settlement	ST2894
Tal-y-waun	Tal-y-waun	Talywain	Settlement	SO2604
Y Transh	Tranch		Settlement	SO2700
Trefddyn	Trefethin	Trevethin	Settlement	SO2702
Two Locks	Two Locks		Area	ST2894
Tŷ-canol	Tŷ-canol		Settlement	ST2694
Waunfelin	Waunfelin	Wainfelin	Settlement	SO2701
Y Dafarn Newydd	New Inn		Settlement	ST3099

=== October 2026 ===
In October 2026, Torfaen County Borough Council and the commissioner agreed on a new list of 54 official names.
