= List of places in Torfaen =

This is a list of places in the Torfaen county borough, south Wales.

== Principal towns ==
- Abersychan
- Blaenafon
- Cwmbran
- Pontypool

== Villages ==
- Sebastopol
- Griffithstown
- Cwmafon
- Pontnewydd
- Pontnewynydd
- Croesyceiliog
- Llanyrafon
- Ponthir
- New Inn

== Communities ==
- See List of communities in Torfaen

== Electoral wards ==
To Torfaen County Borough Council

=== 2004–2022 ===
Abersychan, Blaenavon, Brynwern, Coed Eva, Croesyceiliog North, Croesyceiliog South, Cwmynyscoy, Fairwater, Greenmeadow, Llantarnam, Llanyrafon North, Llanyrafon South, New Inn (divided between New Inn Lower/New Inn Upper from 1995-2004), Panteg, Pontnewydd, Pontnewynydd, Pontypool, Snatchwood, St Cadocs and Penygarn, St Dials, Trevethin, Two Locks, Upper Cwmbran, Wainfelin

=== 2022– ===
Abersychan, Blaenavon, Coed Eva, Croesyceiliog, Cwmynyscoy, Fairwater, Greenmeadow, Llanfrechfa and Ponthir, Llantarnam, Llanyrafon, New Inn, Panteg, Pontnewydd, Pontnewynydd and Snatchwood, Pontypool Fawr, St Dials, Trevethin and Penygarn, Two Locks, Upper Cwmbran
