= 2017 Torfaen County Borough Council election =

Local election in Wales

- 4 May 2017

All 40 seats to Torfaen County Borough Council 21 seats needed for a majority

	First party	Second party	Third party
Leader	Anthony Hunt	None	Huw Bevan
Party	Labour	Independent	Conservative
Leader's seat	Panteg	None	Llanyrafon East and Ponthir
Last election	30 seats, 41.8%	8 seats, 31.4%	4 seats, 11.6%
Seats before	30	8	4
Seats won	29	11	4
Seat change	▼1	▲3	Steady
Popular vote	11,949	8,464	6,281
Percentage	40.8%	28.9%	21.4%
Swing	▼1.0 pp	▼2.5 pp	▲10.2 pp
	Fourth party	Fifth party	Sixth party
Leader	None	Jeff Rees	None
Party	UKIP	Plaid Cymru	Green
Leader's seat	None	Fairwater (lost re-election)	None
Last election	0 seats, 1.1%	2 seats, 11.9%	0 seats, 0.7%
Seats before	0	1	0
Seats won	0	0	0
Seat change	Steady	▼2	Steady
Popular vote	1,374	1,060	98
Percentage	4.7%	3.6%	0.3%
Swing	▲3.6 pp	▼8.3 pp	▼0.4 pp
- Results of the 2017 Torfaen County Borough Council election
Leader before election
Anthony Hunt
Labour
Leader after election
Anthony Hunt
Labour

As part of the 2017 local elections in Wales on 4 May 2017, the 40 seats of Torfaen County Borough Council were up for election. There were 113 candidates. The Labour Party retained overall control of the council.

== Background ==
In the previous election in 2012, Labour took overall control of the council.

== Results ==
The Labour Party retained their majority on the council.

Results
Party	Seats	Change
Labour	29	0
Independent	11	▲2
Conservative	4	0
Plaid Cymru	0	▼2

== Results by ward ==
Councillors were elected in 24 wards.

=== Abersychan ===
Abersychan (3 seats)
Party	Candidate	Votes	%	±%
Independent	Christopher Tew	1,242	26.4	
Labour	Giles Davies	1,000	10.7	
Independent	Raymond Williams	906	19.3	
Labour	Wayne Tomlinson	706	15.0	
Labour	Julie Rogers	504	10.7	
Conservative	Jean Holloway	338	7.2	
Turnout		4,696		
Independent gain from Labour				
Labour hold				
Independent gain from Labour				

=== Blaenavon ===
Blaenavon (3 seats)
Party	Candidate	Votes	%	±%
Labour	Alan Jones	823	19.9	
Independent	Stuart Evans	777	18.8	
Independent	Janet Jones	588	14.2	
Labour	Lewis Evans	475	11.5	
Independent	Nick Horler	456	11.0	
Labour	Roderick Denley-Jones	373	9.0	
Plaid Cymru	Gareth McCann	370	8.9	
Conservative	Jean Orton	139	3.4	
UKIP	Ian Williams	134	3.2	
Turnout		4,135		
Labour hold				
Independent gain from Labour				
Independent hold				

=== Brynwern ===
Brynwern (1 seat)
Party	Candidate	Votes	%	±%
Labour	Leonard Constance	244	45.6	
Independent	Mark Jones	136	25.4	
Independent	Kathryn Shaw	87	16.3	
UKIP	Bryan Matthews	68	12.7	
Turnout		535		
Labour hold				

=== Coed Eva ===
Coed Eva (1 seat)
Party	Candidate	Votes	%	±%
Labour	Fiona Cross	397	62.6	
Independent	Alastair Cunnington	237	37.3	
Turnout		634		
Labour gain from Plaid Cymru				

=== Croesyceiliog North ===
Croesyceiliog North (2 seats)
Party	Candidate	Votes	%	±%
Labour	Richard Clark	601	29.7	
Labour	Joanne Gauden	556	27.5	
Conservative	Benjamin Lewis	446	22.0	
Conservative	Lawrence Mansell	422	20.8	
Turnout		2,025		
Labour hold				
Labour hold				

=== Croesyceiliog South ===
Croesyceiliog South (1 seat)
Party	Candidate	Votes	%	±%
Labour	Veronica Crick	341	54.3	
Conservative	Shannon Waldron	286	45.6	
Turnout		627		
Labour hold				

=== Cwmynyscoy ===
Cwmynyscoy (1 seat)
Party	Candidate	Votes	%	±%
Labour	Neil Waite	192	56.1	
UKIP	Goff Jones	150	43.9	
Turnout		342		
Labour hold				

=== Fairwater ===
Fairwater (2 seats)
Party	Candidate	Votes	%	±%
Labour	Kelly Preston	498	20.5	
Labour	Rose Seabourne	427	17.6	
Plaid Cymru	Jeff Rees	417	17.2	
Independent	David Simpson	298	12.3	
Conservative	Jane Brown	243	10.0	
Conservative	Bob White	217	8.9	
Plaid Cymru	Louise King	203	8.4	
UKIP	Andrew Quick	122	5.0	
Turnout		2,425		
Labour gain from Plaid Cymru				
Labour hold				

=== Greenmeadow ===
Greenmeadow (2 seats)
Party	Candidate	Votes	%	±%
Labour	Mandy Owen	367	28.3	
Independent	Jason O'Connell	331	25.5	
Independent	Catherine Bonera	329	25.3	
Labour	Mark Ward-Jones	269	20.8	
Turnout		1,296		
Labour hold				
Independent gain from Labour				

=== Llantarnam ===
Llantarnam (2 seats)
Party	Candidate	Votes	%	±%
Labour	Dave Thomas	838	26.4	
Labour	Alan Slade	701	22.1	
Independent	Maria Graham	691	21.8	
Conservative	Kay Thomas	501	15.8	
Conservative	Stephen Senior	376	11.9	
Communist	Mark Griffiths	62	2.0	
Turnout		3,169		
Labour hold				
Labour hold				

=== Llanyrafon East and Ponthir ===
Llanyrafon East and Ponthir (1 seat)
Party	Candidate	Votes	%	±%
Conservative	Huw Bevan	593	72.5	
Labour	Trevor Neatherway	225	27.5	
Turnout		818		
Conservative win (new seat)				

=== Llanyrafon West ===
Llanyrafon West (1 seat)
Party	Candidate	Votes	%	±%
Labour	Glyn Caron	483	61.1	
Conservative	Marc Hale	307	38.9	
Turnout		790		
Labour win (new seat)				

=== New Inn ===
New Inn (3 seats)
Party	Candidate	Votes	%	±%
Conservative	Raymond Mills	1,171	21.7	
Conservative	Nicholas Jones	1,067	19.8	
Conservative	Richard Overton	1,013	18.8	
Labour	Marian Williams	655	12.2	
Labour	Adrian Williams	594	11.0	
Labour	Farooq Dastgir	576	10.7	
Independent	Philip Hadgkiss	314	5.8	
Turnout		5,390		
Conservative hold				
Conservative hold				
Conservative hold				

=== Panteg ===
Panteg (3 seats)
Party	Candidate	Votes	%	±%
Labour	Anthony Hunt	1,214	21.2	
Labour	Norma Parrish	1,140	19.9	
Labour	David Yeowell	1,039	18.2	
Conservative	Rebecca Senior	680	11.9	
Conservative	Jonathon Martin	667	11.7	
Conservative	Adrian Lang	620	10.8	
UKIP	Russ Ford	356	6.2	
Turnout		5,716		
Labour hold				
Labour hold				
Labour hold				

=== Pontnewydd ===
Pontnewydd (3 seats)
Party	Candidate	Votes	%	±%
Labour	Stuart Ashley	821	23.0	
Labour	David Daniels	806	22.6	
Labour	Jessica Powell	784	22.0	
Independent	Damian Edmunds	617	17.3	
Conservative	Joe Chesterman	543	15.2	
Turnout		3,571		
Labour hold				
Labour hold				
Labour hold				

=== Pontnewynydd ===
Pontnewynydd (1 seat)
Party	Candidate	Votes	%	±%
Labour	Jon Horlor	145	38.4	
Independent	Kelvin Harnett	116	30.7	
Independent	Hilary Drinkwater	64	16.9	
UKIP	Phil Wedlock	53	14.0	
Turnout		378		
Labour gain from Independent				

=== Pontypool ===
Pontypool (1 seat)
Party	Candidate	Votes	%	±%
Labour	Gaynor James	145	37.8	
Independent	Mike Harris	116	28.5	
Independent	Fred Wildgust	64	23.3	
UKIP	Phil Jolliffe	53	10.4	
Turnout		576		
Labour gain from Independent				

=== St Cadocs and Penygarn ===
St Cadocs and Penygarn (1 seat)
Party	Candidate	Votes	%	±%
Labour	Sue Malson	231	44.8	
Plaid Cymru	Neil Mason	142	27.5	
UKIP	Bryn Parker	79	15.3	
Conservative	Deanna Hallett	64	12.4	
Turnout		516		
Labour hold				

=== St Dials ===
St Dials (2 seats)
Party	Candidate	Votes	%	±%
Independent	Elizabeth Haynes	643	12.4	
Labour	Fay Jones	415	23.6	
Labour	Kebba Manneh	414	23.5	
Conservative	John Taylor	290	16.5	
Turnout		1,762		
Independent hold				
Labour hold				

=== Snatchwood ===
Snatchwood (1 seat)
Party	Candidate	Votes	%	±%
Independent	Gwyn Jenkins	319	50.5	
Labour	Barry Taylor	313	49.5	
Turnout		632		
Independent gain from Labour				

=== Trevethin ===
Trevethin (2 seats)
Party	Candidate	Votes	%	±%
Labour	Matt Ford	424	28.6	
Independent	Louise Shepphard	400	26.9	
Labour	Lewis Jones	372	25.1	
Independent	Paul Hale	289	19.7	
Turnout		1,485		
Labour hold				
Independent gain from Labour				

=== Two Locks ===
Two Locks (3 seats)
Party	Candidate	Votes	%	±%
Labour	Colette Thomas	807	18.6	
Independent	Ronald Burnett	787	18.1	
Labour	Peter Jones	572	13.2	
Labour	Lawrence Smith-Higgins	567	13.1	
Conservative	Matthew Powell	478	11.0	
Independent	Lorraine Hobin	437	10.1	
Conservative	Lewis Williams	367	8.5	
Independent	Keith Jones	322	7.4	
Turnout		4,337		
Labour hold				
Independent hold				
Labour hold				

=== Upper Cwmbran ===
Upper Cwmbran (3 seats)
Party	Candidate	Votes	%	±%
Independent	Robert Kemp	802	27.4	
Labour	Steven Evans	502	17.2	
Labour	Kathy Evans	394	13.5	
Labour	Carrie Powell	321	11.0	
Independent	Steven Bonera	268	9.2	
UKIP	Paul Hughes	207	7.1	
Conservative	Leanne Murray	202	6.9	
Plaid Cymru	Yvonne Balakrishnan	131	4.5	
Green	Steven Jenkins	98	3.4	
Turnout		2,925		
Independent hold				
Labour hold				
Labour hold				

=== Wainfelin ===
Wainfelin (1 seat)
Party	Candidate	Votes	%	±%
Independent	Mike Jeremiah	305	47.3	
Labour	Bob Rogers	195	30.2	
UKIP	Dennis Way	145	22.5	
Turnout		645		
Independent hold				
