= List of communities in Torfaen =

The communities of Torfaen.

Torfaen is a county borough in the south-east of Wales. It is one of the 22 principal areas of Wales.

Communities are the lowest tier of local government in Wales. Unlike English counties, which often contain unparished areas, all Welsh principal areas are entirely divided into communities.

There are 16 communities in Torfaen.

== List of communities in Torfaen ==
Numbered map of the communities in Torfaen

Name	Population	Map	Key on numbered map
Abersychan (Note: This community is also a county borough electoral ward with the same name.)	7,064		2
Blaenavon	6,055		1
Croesyceiliog (Note: Croesyceiliog community is also a county borough electoral ward of the same name. Prior to May 2022 it comprised two wards, of Croesyceiliog North and Croesyceiliog South)	5,246		10
Cwmbran Central	9,947		12
Fairwater (Note: Fairwater community comprises the electoral wards of Coed Eva, Fairwater, and Greenmeadow.)	11,632		11
Henllys	2,682		14
Llantarnam	4,125		15
Llanyrafon	3,239		13
New Inn	5,986		5
Panteg	7,217		7
Pen Tranch (Note: Prior to May 2022 Pen Tranch community comprised the county borough electoral wards of Pontnewynydd, Snatchwood, and Wainfelin.)	5,989		3
Ponthir	1,482		16
Pontnewydd	4,954		9
Pontymoile (Note: Prior to May 2022 Pontymoile community comprised the county borough electoral wards of Brynwern, Cwmyniscoy, and Pontypool.)	5,082		6
Trevethin (Note: Trevethin community is also a county borough electoral ward with the same name. Prior to May 2022 it comprised the ward of St Cadocs and Penygarn, and a smaller ward of Trevethin.)	5,147		4
Upper Cwmbran	5,228		8

== See also ==
- Torfaen County Borough Council
- List of communities in Wales
- List of places in Torfaen
