= 2012 Torfaen County Borough Council election =

2012 Welsh local government election

Results of the 2012 Torfaen County Borough Council election

The 2012 Torfaen County Borough Council election took place on 3 May 2012 to elect members of Torfaen County Borough Council in Wales. This was on the same day as other 2012 United Kingdom local elections. The Council shifted from no overall control to Labour.

== Results ==
2012 Torfaen County Borough Council election
Party	Seats	Gains	Losses	Net gain/loss	Seats %	Votes %	Votes	+/−
Labour	30			+12	68.2	41.8	11,362	+6.9
Independent	8			-5	18.2	31.4	8,530	+2.5
Plaid Cymru	2			-1	4.5	11.9	3,226	+3.9
Conservative	4			-1	9.1	11.6	3,147	-0.4
Liberal Democrats	0			-2	0.0	1.3	362	-4.8
UKIP	0			0	0.0	1.1	289	New
Green	0			0	0.0	0.7	178	-0.8
Communist	0			0	0.0	0.3	95	New
Blaenau Gwent PV	-	-	-	-3	-	-	0	-8.3
BNP	-	-	-	-	-	-	0	-0.2

== Ward results ==
=== Abersychan ===
Abersychan ward (3 seats)
Party	Candidate	Votes	%	±%
Labour	Gwyneira Clark	845	45.8	
Labour	Wayne Tomlinson	679		
Labour	Giles Davies	623		
Independent	Raymond Williams	570	30.9	
Plaid Cymru	David Bath	252	13.7	
Independent	Thomas Burgess	244		
Independent	Nicola Yeates	238		
Independent	Anthony Thomas	199		
Green	Robert Clarke	178	9.6	
Independent	David Donnelly	175		
Independent	Sheree Rowlands	157		
Turnout			35.9	
Labour hold		Swing		
Labour gain from Independent		Swing		
Labour gain from Independent		Swing		

=== Blaenafon/Blaenavon ===
Blaenavon ward (3 seats)
Party	Candidate	Votes	%	±%
Independent	Stuart Evans	854	46.9	
Labour	Alan Jones	671	36.8	
Labour	Alun Furzer	653		
Independent	Janet Jones	608		
Labour	Lewis Evans	526		
Independent	Brian Whitcombe	512		
Independent	Thomas Huish	485		
Liberal Democrats	Warren Perks	202	11.1	
Communist	David Brown	95	5.2	
Liberal Democrats	Claire Higgins	89		
Turnout			41.3	
Independent hold		Swing		
Labour gain from Independent		Swing		
Labour gain from Independent		Swing		

=== Bryn-wern ===
Bryn-wern ward (1 seat)
Party	Candidate	Votes	%	±%
Labour	Leonard Constance	319	58.7	
Independent	Brian Matthews	105	19.3	
Independent	Nigel Harris	82	15.1	
Plaid Cymru	Glyn Page	37	6.8	
Turnout			40.8	
Labour gain from Blaenau Gwent PV		Swing		

=== Coed Efa/Coed Eva ===
Coed Eva ward (1 seat)
Party	Candidate	Votes	%	±%
Plaid Cymru	F. Cross*	300	50.1	
Independent	M. Gibbs	135	22.5	
Labour	J. James	118	19.7	
Conservative	K. Thomas	46	7.7	
Turnout			40.8	
Plaid Cymru hold		Swing		

=== Gogledd Croesyceiliog/Croesyceiliog North ===
Croesyceiliog North ward (2 seats)
Party	Candidate	Votes	%	±%
Labour	Richard Clark*	627	59.3	
Labour	Cynthia Beynon	479		
Independent	John Jenner	256	24.2	
Independent	Terence Irons	224		
Conservative	Charles Ashton	175	16.5	
Independent	Richard Turner-Thomas	92		
Turnout			40.6	
Labour hold		Swing		
Labour hold		Swing		

=== De Croesyceiliog/Croesyceiliog South ===
Croesyceiliog South ward (1 seat)
Party	Candidate	Votes	%	±%
Labour	Veronica Crick	304	51.1	
Conservative	Nicholas Jones	87	14.6	
Independent	Vaughan Sterry	80	13.4	
UKIP	David Rowlands	54	9.1	
Independent	Susan Chaloner	35	5.9	
Independent	Nadine Whitty	20	3.4	
Plaid Cymru	Phillip Jones	15	2.5	
Turnout			40.6	
Labour hold		Swing		

=== Cwmynysgoi/Cwmynyscoy ===
Cwmynyscoy ward (1 seat)
Party	Candidate	Votes	%	±%
Labour	Neil Waite	274	52.9	
Independent	Adrian Bold	225	43.4	
Plaid Cymru	Mark Adams	10	1.9	
Conservative	Hannah Murphy	9	1.7	
Turnout			49.0	
Labour gain from Blaenau Gwent PV		Swing		

=== Fairwater ===
Fairwater ward (2 seats)
Party	Candidate	Votes	%	±%
Plaid Cymru	Jeff Rees	530	40.8	
Labour	Philip Seabourne	474	36.5	
Labour	Rosemarie Seabourne	392		
Plaid Cymru	Natalie Salkeld	382		
Independent	Anthony Devlin	294	22.7	
Independent	David Brown	174		
Independent	Steven Bonera	130		
Turnout			31.4	
Plaid Cymru hold		Swing		
Labour hold		Swing		

=== Greenmeadow ===
Greenmeadow ward (2 seats)
Party	Candidate	Votes	%	±%
Labour	Robert Wellington	424	53.8	
Labour	Amanda Owen	365		
Independent	Catherine Lewis	364	46.2	
Independent	Keith Williams	231		
Independent	Polly Cunnington	172		
Turnout			31.4	
Labour gain from Independent		Swing		
Labour hold		Swing		

=== Llantarnam ===
Llantarnam ward (2 seats)
Party	Candidate	Votes	%	±%
Independent	Maria Graham	609	38.1	
Labour	David Daniels	496	31.0	
Conservative	Paul Williams	495	30.9	
Labour	Linda Joseph	455		
Independent	Anthony Burnett	363		
Independent	Graham Pitt	261		
Turnout			38.0	
Labour gain from Plaid Cymru		Swing		
Independent gain from Conservative		Swing		

=== Gogledd Llanyrafon/Llanyrafon North ===
Llanyrafon North ward (1 seat)
Party	Candidate	Votes	%	±%
Labour	Glyn Caron	434	69.6	
Independent	Cora Reeve	139	22.3	
Conservative	Scott Murphy	51	8.2	
Turnout			39.5	
Labour gain from Liberal Democrats		Swing		

=== De Llanyrafon/Llanyrafon South ===
Llanyrafon South ward (1 seat)
Party	Candidate	Votes	%	±%
Conservative	Huw Bevan	487	49.6	
Labour	David Dewar	350	35.7	
Independent	Claire Elliott	144	14.7	
Turnout			43.9	
Conservative hold		Swing		

=== New Inn ===
New Inn ward (3 seats)
Party	Candidate	Votes	%	±%
Conservative	Raymond Mills	1086	53.1	
Conservative	Graham Smith	1061		
Conservative	David James	1050		
Labour	Marian Williams	739	36.2	
Labour	John Turner	724		
Labour	Maurice Morgan	671		
Plaid Cymru	Bryan Bale	219	10.7	
Turnout			41.0	
Conservative hold		Swing		
Conservative hold		Swing		
Conservative hold		Swing		

=== Panteg ===
Panteg ward (3 seats)
Party	Candidate	Votes	%	±%
Labour	Norma Parrish	1079	39.0	
Labour	Anthony Hunt	989		
Labour	David Yeowell	971		
Independent	Kathleen Williams	566	20.4	
Plaid Cymru	Marcus Warner	481	17.4	
Independent	Brian Lovelock	456		
Independent	Deborah Smyth	452		
Conservative	Lyndon Bishop	299	10.8	
UKIP	Keiron Austwick	184	6.6	
Independent	Richard Overton	184		
Liberal Democrats	Brenda Edwards	160		
Liberal Democrats	Ryan Richards	82		
Turnout			41.0	
Labour hold		Swing		
Labour hold		Swing		
Labour gain from Liberal Democrats		Swing		

=== Pontnewydd ===
Pontnewydd ward (3 seats)
Party	Candidate	Votes	%	±%
Labour	Jessica Powell	811	44.0	
Labour	Brian Mawby	791		
Labour	Stuart Ashley	707		
Plaid Cymru	Thomas Davies	419	22.7	
Independent	Peter Cathcart	403	21.9	
Independent	Martyn Stinton	261		
Conservative	Damian Edmunds	209	11.3	
Conservative	Louise McLeod	195		
Turnout			35.4	
Labour hold		Swing		
Labour hold		Swing		
Labour gain from Independent		Swing		

=== Pontnewynydd ===
Pontnewynydd ward (1 seat)
Party	Candidate	Votes	%	±%
Independent	Kelvin Harnett	145	37.1	
Labour	Gaynor James	117	29.9	
Independent	Ronald Jones	65	16.6	
Independent	Steven Joy	55	14.1	
Plaid Cymru	Yvonne Balakrishnan	9	2.3	
Turnout			35.4	
Independent hold		Swing		

=== Pont-y-pŵl/Pontypool ===
Pontypool ward (1 seat)
Party	Candidate	Votes	%	±%
Independent	Michael Harris	309	52.1	
Labour	John Killick	213	35.9	
Plaid Cymru	Paul Valente	71	12.0	
Turnout			42.0	
Independent hold		Swing		

=== St Cadocs a Phen-y-garn/St Cadocs and Penygarn ===
St Cadocs and Penygarn ward (1 seat)
Party	Candidate	Votes	%	±%
Labour	Neil Mason	216	42.3	
Independent	Ian Williams	202	39.5	
Plaid Cymru	Philip Davies	93	18.2	
Turnout			44.7	
Labour hold		Swing		

=== Llanfihangel Llantarnam/St Dials ===
St Dials ward (2 seats)
Party	Candidate	Votes	%	±%
Independent	Elizabeth Haynes	579	54.6	
Labour	Stephen Brooks	326	30.7	
Independent	Michelle Corrigan	320		
Labour	Kebba Manneh	296		
Independent	Sarah Cunnington	179		
Plaid Cymru	Gareth White	156	14.7	
Turnout			35.9	
Independent hold		Swing		
Labour hold		Swing		

=== Snatchwood ===
Snatchwood ward (1 seat)
Party	Candidate	Votes	%	±%
Labour	Barry Taylor	343	58.3	
Independent	Christopher Tew	194	33.0	
UKIP	Kevin Boucher	51	8.7	
Turnout			36.6	
Labour gain from People's Vote		Swing		

=== Trefddyn/Trevethin ===
Trevethin ward (1 seat)
Party	Candidate	Votes	%	±%
Labour	Lewis Jones	399	52.3	
Labour	John Marshall	323		
Independent	Mervyn Horlor	227	29.8	
Independent	David Millett	169		
Plaid Cymru	Neil Johnson	137	18.0	
Turnout			30.8	
Labour hold		Swing		
Labour hold		Swing		

=== Two Locks ===
Two Locks ward (3 seats)
Party	Candidate	Votes	%	±%
Labour	Colette Thomas	919	44.9	
Labour	Pamela Cameron	693		
Independent	Ronald Burnett	679	33.2	
Labour	Peter Jones	678		
Independent	Lorraine Hobin	426		
Independent	Alastair Cunnington	303		
Independent	Keith Jones	269		
Plaid Cymru	Sian Hanlon	245	12.0	
Conservative	Jonathan Lewis	203	9.9	
Conservative	Jatinderpal Singh Bajwa	144		
Turnout			37.9	
Labour hold		Swing		
Independent hold		Swing		
Labour gain from Independent		Swing		

=== Cwmbrân/Upper Cwmbran ===
Upper Cwmbran ward (3 seats)
Party	Candidate	Votes	%	±%
Independent	Robert Kemp	684	42.7	
Labour	Bernard Cunningham	665	41.5	
Labour	Mary Barnett	610		
Labour	Robert Jones	484		
Independent	Leslie Thomas	328		
Plaid Cymru	Eli Jones	252	15.7	
Turnout			31.4	
Labour hold		Swing		
Labour hold		Swing		
Independent gain from Labour		Swing		

=== Waunfelin/Wainfelin ===
Wainfelin ward (1 seat)
Party	Candidate	Votes	%	±%
Independent	Michael Jeremiah	373	52.6	
Labour	Robert Benjamin	199	28.1	
Independent	Benjamin Cunnington	137	19.3	
Turnout			37.6	
Independent hold		Swing		
