= 2022 Torfaen County Borough Council election =

2022 Welsh local government election

2022 Torfaen Council election
- 5 May 2022

All 40 seats to Torfaen County Borough Council 21 seats needed for a majority

	First party	Second party	Third party
Party	Labour	Independent	Conservative
Seats won	30	10	0
Seat change	▲2	▲2	▼4

A 2022 election to Torfaen County Borough Council took place on 5 May 2022 as part of the 2022 Welsh local elections. The previous full council election took place in May 2017.

Welsh Labour held the council with a majority, gaining two more seats.

== Boundary review ==
There were numerous changes to the boundaries and representation of wards in the county borough, enacted by The County Borough of Torfaen (Electoral Arrangements) Order 2021. Only 11 wards - Abersychan, Blaenavon, Coed Eva, Greenmeadow, Llantarnam, New Inn, Panteg, Pontnewydd, St Dials, Two Locks and Upper Cwmbran - retained their previous boundaries.

== Results ==
Results
Party	Seats	Change
Labour Party	30	▲2
Independents	10	▲2
Conservative Party	0	▼4

== Ward results ==
=== Abersychan ===
Abersychan
Party	Candidate	Votes	%	±%
Independent	Chris Tew	1,027	63.6	
Labour	Giles Davies	935	57.9	
Labour	Lynda Clarkson	772	47.8	
Independent	Wayne Tomlinson	481	29.8	
Labour	Bob Rogers	380	23.5	
Conservative	Andrew Millard	259	16.0	
Turnout		1,616	32	
Independent hold		Swing		
Labour hold		Swing		
Labour gain from Independent		Swing		

=== Blaenavon ===
Blaenavon
Party	Candidate	Votes	%	±%
Independent	Janet Jones	843	55.6	
Independent	Nick Horler	818	54.0	
Labour	Liam Cowles	726	47.9	
Labour	Lewis Evans	606	40.0	
Labour	John Hunt	443	29.2	
Conservative	Alanna Senior	235	15.5	
Turnout		1,515	32	
Independent hold		Swing		
Independent hold		Swing		
Labour hold		Swing		

=== Coed Eva ===
Coed Eva
Party	Candidate	Votes	%	±%
Labour	Fiona Cross	435	69.7	
Conservative	Nathan Edmunds	117	18.8	
Independent	Steven Clarke	72	11.5	
Turnout		624	32	
Labour hold		Swing		

=== Croesyceiliog ===
Croesyceiliog
Party	Candidate	Votes	%	±%
Labour	Richard Clark	950	66.1	
Labour	Joanne Gauden	948	65.9	
Conservative	Amy Bubela	421	29.3	
Conservative	Roger Morgan	380	26.4	
Turnout		1,438	34	
Labour win (new seat)				
Labour win (new seat)				

=== Fairwater ===
Fairwater
Party	Candidate	Votes	%	±%
Labour	Rose Seabourne	697	65.8	
Labour	Jayne Watkins	660	62.3	
Conservative	Andrew Leaves	329	31.0	
Turnout		1,060	27	
Labour win (new seat)				
Labour win (new seat)				

=== Greenmeadow ===
Greenmeadow
Party	Candidate	Votes	%	±%
Labour	Mandy Owen	427	62.5	
Independent	Jason O'Connell	256	37.5	
Turnout		683	33	
Labour hold		Swing		

=== Llanfrechfa & Ponthir ===
Llanfrechfa & Ponthir
Party	Candidate	Votes	%	±%
Labour	Karl Gauden	389	50.6	
Conservative	Huw Bevan	380	49.4	
Turnout		769	43	
Labour win (new seat)				

=== Llantarnam ===
Llantarnam
Party	Candidate	Votes	%	±%
Independent	David Thomas	1,081	55.5	
Independent	Alan Slade	996	51.1	
Independent	Nick Jones	950	48.7	
Labour	David Bolton	667	34.2	
Labour	Anthony Bird	550	28.2	
Labour	Leighton Johnstone	481	24.7	
Plaid Cymru	Matthew Woolfall Jones	432	22.2	
Green	Philip Davies	268	13.8	
Turnout		1,949	37	
Independent gain from Labour		Swing		
Independent gain from Labour		Swing		
Independent win (new seat)				

=== Llanyravon ===
Llanyravon
Party	Candidate	Votes	%	±%
Labour	David Williams	469	66.6	
Conservative	Cory Scriven	235	33.4	
Turnout		704	36	
Labour win (new seat)				

=== New Inn ===
New Inn
Party	Candidate	Votes	%	±%
Labour	Nick Byrne	906	53.0	
Labour	Rosemary Matthews	859	50.2	
Labour	Jon James	848	49.6	
Conservative	David James	780	45.6	
Conservative	Richard Overton	677	39.6	
Conservative	Nicholas Jones	644	37.7	
Turnout		1,710	35	
Labour gain from Conservative		Swing		
Labour gain from Conservative		Swing		
Labour gain from Conservative		Swing		

=== Panteg ===
Panteg
Party	Candidate	Votes	%	±%
Labour	Anthony Hunt	1,480	74.7	
Labour	Norma Parrish	1,253	63.3	
Labour	Nathan Yeowell	1,230	62.1	
Conservative	Stephen Senior	501	25.3	
Conservative	Jonathon Martin	415	20.9	
Conservative	Adrian Lang	403	20.3	
Turnout		1,981	33	
Labour hold		Swing		
Labour hold		Swing		
Labour hold		Swing		

=== Pontnewydd ===
Pontnewydd
Party	Candidate	Votes	%	±%
Labour	David Daniels	984	59.3	
Labour	Sue Morgan	949	57.2	
Labour	Stuart Ashley	863	52.0	
Independent	Duncan Campbell	507	30.6	
Independent	Maxine Brankley	481	29.0	
Independent	Damian Edmunds	472	28.5	
Liberal Democrats	Ryan Richards	163	9.8	
Turnout		1,659	33	
Labour hold		Swing		
Labour hold		Swing		
Labour hold		Swing		

=== Pontnewynydd & Snatchwood ===
Pontnewynydd & Snatchwood
Party	Candidate	Votes	%	±%
Labour	Alfie Best	412	46.0	
Labour	Nicholas Simons	389	43.4	
Independent	Gwyn Jenkins	347	38.7	
Independent	Russell Burgess	282	31.5	
Conservative	Michael Clarke	138	15.4	
Turnout		896	30	
Labour win (new seat)				
Labour win (new seat)				

=== Pontypool Fawr ===
Pontypool Fawr
Party	Candidate	Votes	%	±%
Independent	Mark Jones	940	54.3	
Labour	Caroline Price	838	48.4	
Labour	Gaynor James	812	46.9	
Labour	Paul Stephens	639	36.9	
Conservative	Lyndon Bishop	355	20.5	
Turnout		1,732	30	
Independent win (new seat)				
Labour win (new seat)				
Labour win (new seat)				

=== St Dials ===
St Dials
Party	Candidate	Votes	%	±%
Independent	Elizabeth Haynes	630	57.2	
Independent	Catherine Bonera	530	48.1	
Labour	Fay Jones	437	39.7	
Labour	Kebba Manneh	349	31.7	
Conservative	Paul Thomas	102	9.3	
Turnout		1,101	31	
Independent hold		Swing		
Independent gain from Labour		Swing		

=== Trevethin & Penygarn ===
Trevethin & Penygarn
Party	Candidate	Votes	%	±%
Labour	Sue Malson	676	74.3	
Labour	Jon Horler	574	63.1	
Conservative	Andrew White	215	23.6	
Turnout		910	23	
Labour win (new seat)				
Labour win (new seat)				

=== Two Locks ===
Two Locks
Party	Candidate	Votes	%	±%
Labour	Colette Thomas	781	50.5	
Labour	Peter Jones	695	44.9	
Independent	Ron Burnett	597	38.6	
Labour	Kathy Evans	562	36.3	
Independent	Kevin Fortey	362	23.4	
Conservative	Jane Brown	241	15.6	
Conservative	Alexander Boyce	215	13.9	
Conservative	Rebecca Senior	189	12.2	
Liberal Democrats	Mark Davies	165	10.7	
Liberal Democrats	Brendan Roberts	127	8.2	
Freedom Alliance	Vicky Stamper	47	3.0	
Turnout		1,547	23	
Labour hold		Swing		
Labour hold		Swing		
Independent hold		Swing		

=== Upper Cwmbran ===
Upper Cwmbran
Party	Candidate	Votes	%	±%
Labour	Steven Evans	571	57.6	
Labour	Lucy Williams	455	45.9	
Independent	Sian Legge	387	39.0	
Independent	Robert Kemp	373	37.6	
Turnout		992	22	
Labour hold		Swing		
Labour hold		Swing		

== Changes 2022-2026 ==
=== Affiliation changes ===
Llantarnam's three Independent councillors joined Reform UK in August 2024, forming a Reform UK group on the council.

=== By-elections ===
==== Llantarnam ====
Llantarnam: 2 February 2023
Party	Candidate	Votes	%	±%
Independent	Jason O'Connell	489	41.7	N/A
Labour	David Bolton	406	34.6	
Plaid Cymru	Matthew Woolfall Jones	111	9.5	
Conservative	Stephen John Senior	85	7.2	N/A
Green	Philip Davies	69	5.9	
Liberal Democrats	Miles Andrew Cook	13	1.1	N/A
Majority		83		N/A
Turnout			22.5	
Independent hold		Swing		

The by-election was caused by the resignation of Independent councillor, Nick Jones, in November 2022.

==== Trevethin & Penygarn ====
Trevethin & Penygarn by-election: 13 February 2025
Party	Candidate	Votes	%	±%
Reform	Stuart Keyte	457	47.0	N/A
Labour	Toniann Phillips	259	26.6	–49.3
Independent	Catherine Howells	117	12.0	N/A
Independent	Louise Shepphard	114	11.7	N/A
Green	Tony Clark	25	2.6	N/A
Majority		198	20.4	N/A
Turnout		972	24.7	+1.7
Reform gain from Labour				

Keyte is the first elected representative of Reform UK in Wales.
