= Cwmbran High School =

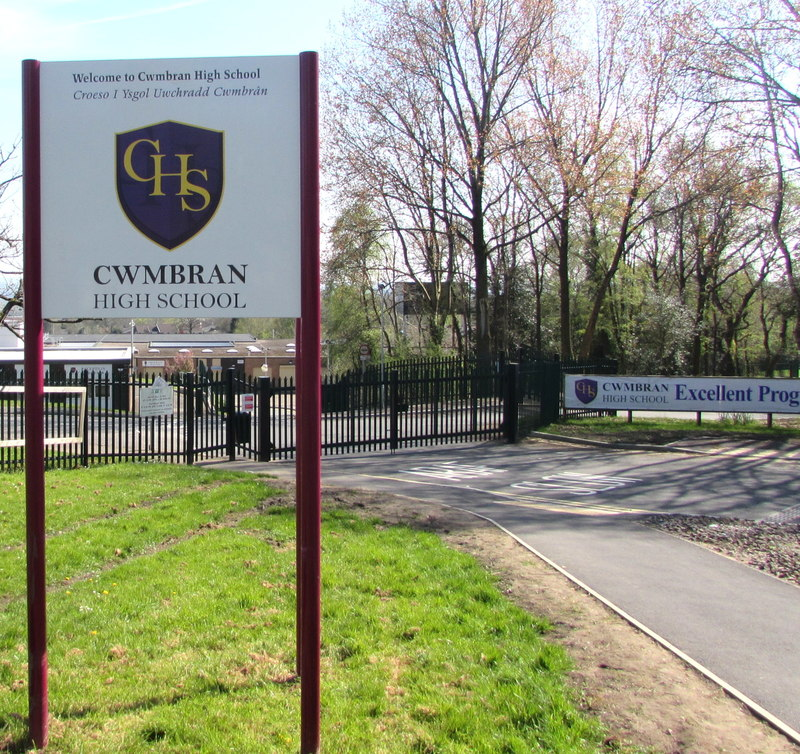

Location
- Ty-Gwyn Way; Fairwater Cwmbran, Torfaen, NP44 4YZ; Wales; 51.647684°N 3.05215°W

Information
- Type: Public comprehensive school
- Motto: "Strive, Achieve, Believe”
- Established: 1971
- Closed: Fairwater High School renamed Cwmbran High School in 2015
- Local authority: Torfaen County Borough Council
- IEB Chair: Janine English
- Headteacher: Matthew Sims
- Staff: 50+
- Gender: Mixed
- Age: 11 to 16
- Enrolment: 1,125 (2023)
- Colours: Purple, Grey and Black
- Website: http://www.cwmbranhighschool.co.uk/

Cwmbran High School (Welsh: Ysgol Uwchradd Cwmbran), previously known as Fairwater High School, is a state-funded and non-selective comprehensive school in the Fairwater district of Cwmbran, Torfaen, Wales.

The school is one of two secondary schools in Cwmbran, the other being Croesyceiliog. It educates children from the age of 11 up to 16. The school also houses the community swimming pool. Construction began in 1969 and was to replace the secondary modern in Coed Eva, opened in 1960, that had to become a primary school in order to accommodate the growing younger population in Cwmbran New Town. In 2015, as part of Torfaen County's 21st Century Schools Programme, Llantarnam School, one of the original Cwmbran New Town schools, closed and was merged with Fairwater High to form a new school on the latter site. It opened in September of that year as Cwmbran High School.

Cwmbran High School also has a Hearing Impaired Base and an ASD Base attached.

The Governing body has now been replaced by an Interim Executive Board (IEB) and has recently introduced a Shadow Governing Body.

== Academics ==
Cwmbran High School is a large school that teaches a wide range of subjects. It is separated into five different blocks:

- Upper school
- Lower school
- Science block
- Design and technology block
- Leisure centre
