= Llanfrechfa Lower =

Former civil parish and community in Torfaen, Monmouthshire, Wales

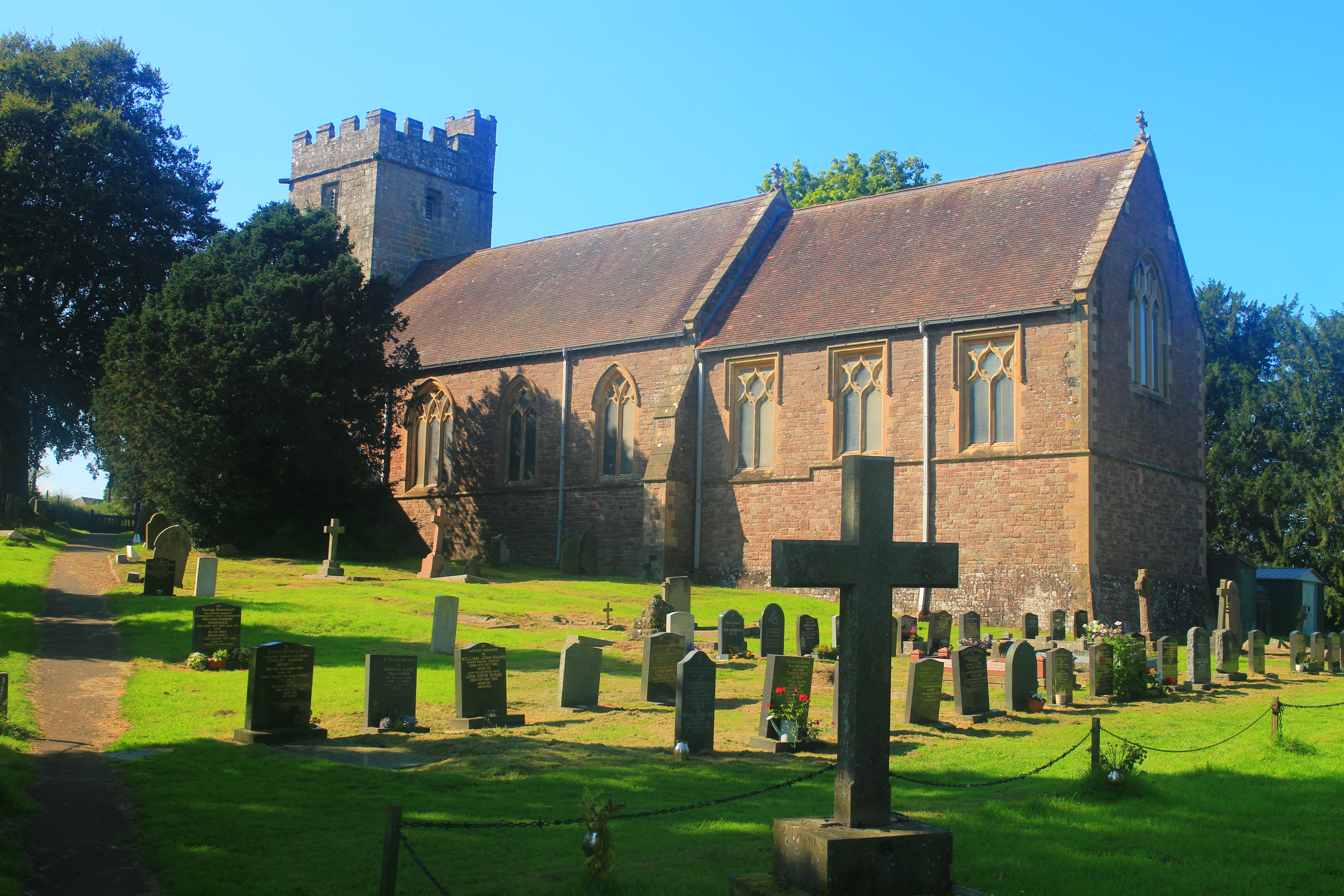
All Saints' Church, LLanfrechfa

Llanfrechfa Lower was a civil parish in Monmouthshire and from 1974 a community in the district of Torfaen. It was also an electoral ward to Gwent County Council.

Between 1889 and 1974 the civil parish was represented at the local level by Llanfrechfa Lower Parish Council. This became Llanfrechfa Lower Community Council from 1 April 1974.

The civil parish (and later community) lay to the east of Cwmbran and centred on the village of Llanfrechfa.

Llanfrechfa Lower was an electoral ward to Gwent County Council between 1973 and 1989, electing two county councillors.

The community was disestablished from 1 April 1985 by The Torfaen (Communities) Order 1985, which created a larger number of communities for Torfaen. Llanfrechfa Lower was divided into Croesyceiliog, Llanyrafon and Ponthir (with a small part being transferred to the community of Llanhennock Fawr in Monmouth District).

The name Llanfrechfa still survives, however, as a small village with a detached church in Ponthir community. The Ordnance Survey grid reference for the village is ST318936.

== See also ==
- Llanfrechfa Grange Hospital
