= Torfaen County Borough Council =

Local government of Torfaen, Wales

Torfaen County Borough Council Cyngor Bwrdeistref Sirol Torfaen (Welsh)

Type
- Type: Principal council of Torfaen

History
- Founded: 1 April 1974

Leadership
- Presiding Member: Rose Seabourne, Labour since 24 May 2022
- Leader: Anthony Hunt, Labour since 1 January 2017
- Chief Executive: Stephen Vickers since 5 July 2021

Structure
- Seats: 40 councillors
- Graph of the party split among 40 seats.
- Political groups: Administration (28) Labour (28) Other parties (12) Reform (4) Independent (8)
- Length of term: 5 years

Elections
- Voting system: First past the post
- Last election: 5 May 2022
- Next election: 6 May 2027

Meeting place
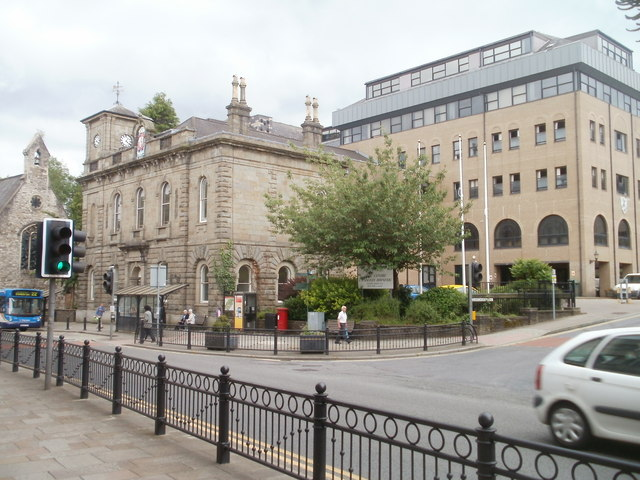
- Civic Centre, Hanbury Road, Pontypool, NP4 6YB

Website
- www.torfaen.gov.uk

Torfaen County Borough Council (Welsh: Cyngor Bwrdeistref Sirol Torfaen) is the local authority for the county borough of Torfaen, one of the principal areas of Wales.

== History ==
The borough council was created in 1974 under the Local Government Act 1972 as a lower-tier district council with borough status. Gwent County Council provided county-level services for the area. The county council was abolished in 1996 and Torfaen became a principal area with county borough status, with the council taking over the functions previously performed by the county council.

Borough status allows Torfaen to give the chair of the council the title of mayor. However, the council discontinued the role of mayor in 2018. A presiding member role has been created instead to chair meetings.

In June 2024 the council agreed to share a chief executive with neighbouring Blaenau Gwent County Borough Council. Torfaen's existing chief executive, Stephen Vickers, was subsequently appointed to the role of joint chief executive for the two councils from January 2025.

== Political control ==
The council has been under Labour majority control since 2012.

The first election to the council was held in 1973, initially operating as a shadow authority before coming into its powers on 1 April 1974. Political control of the council since 1974 has been as follows:

Lower-tier borough

Party in control	Years
Labour	1974–1996

County borough

Party in control	Years
Labour	1996–2008
No overall control	2008–2012
Labour	2012–present

=== Leadership ===
The leaders of the council since c. 1984 have been:

Councillor	Party	From	To
Brian Smith	Labour	c. 1984	2004
Bob Wellington	Labour	2004	31 Dec 2016
Anthony Hunt	Labour	1 Jan 2017	

=== Composition ===
Following the 2022 election and subsequent by-elections and changes of allegiance up to October 2026, the composition of the council was:

Party	Seats
Labour	28
Reform	4
Independent	8
Total	40

Of the independent councillors, five sit together as the 'Independent Group', and the other three sit together as the 'Torfaen Independent Group'. The next election is due in 2027.

== Elections ==
Summary of the council composition after council elections:
Year	Seats	Labour	Independent	Conservative	Liberal Democrats	Plaid Cymru	Control of council
1995	44	41	1	1	1	0	Labour majority control
1999	44	39	3	1	1	0	Labour majority control
2004	44	34	7	1	2	0	Labour majority control. New ward boundaries.
2008	44	18	16 (Note: Including three candidates elected to represent Blaenau Gwent People's Voice.)	5	2	3	Labour minority led.
2012	44	30	8	4	0	2	Labour majority control
2017	44	29	11	4	0	0	Labour majority control
2022	40	30	10	0	0	0	Labour majority control. New ward boundaries.

== Premises ==
The council is based at the Civic Centre on Hanbury Road in Pontypool, comprising Pontypool Town Hall, built in 1856, and a large extension to it which was built in 1991. Between 1996 and 2012, the council also used the six-storey former Gwent County Hall at Croesyceiliog, Cwmbran, sharing the building with Monmouthshire County Council. County Hall closed because of "concrete cancer" and was later demolished, with the council consolidating its offices at the Civic Centre in Pontypool.

== Mayoralty ==
The roles of mayor and deputy mayor were removed from the council in May 2018 as part of the 2018/19 budget. Instead, the council created the post of Presiding Member and Deputy Presiding Member to chair council meetings. From May 2018, the roles and functions undertaken by a mayor have been undertaken by the leader of the council and cabinet members.

=== Past Mayors ===
The mayors of Torfaen from 1974 until the post's abolition in 2018 were:

1974–1974: G M Day
1974–1975: D B Richards
1975–1976: M L Lee
1976–1977: D W Puddle
1977–1978: G S R Powell
1978–1979: S E A James
1979–1980: A J Davies
1980–1981: G S Evans
1981–1982: K Morgan
1982–1983: P Roberts
1983–1984: G I Davies
1984–1985: C Little
1985–1986: H J Rosser
1986–1986: C G Thomas
1986–1988: D J Lloyd
1988–1989: W M Howell
1989–1990: B J Cunningham
1990–1991: S Richards
1991–1992: D J Rex
1992–1993: T Davies
1993–1994: F H Bacon
1994–1995: M H Morgan
1995–1996: D Miller
1996–1997: S Smith
1997–1998: S J Brooks
1998–1999: K Edmunds
1999–2000: B I Ryan
2000–2001: G R Clark
2001–2002: C Thomas
2002–2003: Jack Everson
2003–2004: Doug Davies
2004–2005: Yvonne Warren
2005–2006: Lyndon Irwin
2006–2007: Mary Barnett
2007–2008: Bill King
2008–2009: Nye James
2009–2010: Bob Jones
2010–2011: Tom Huish
2011–2012: Philip Seabourne
2012–2013: Wayne Tomlinson
2013–2014: Neil Mason
2014–2015: Mandy Owen
2015–2016: Giles Davies
2016–2017: Veronica Crick
2017–2018: Jessica Powell

== Electoral divisions ==
Electoral wards in Torfaen

The county borough is divided into 20 electoral wards, returning 40 councillors. There are 6 elected community councils in the region. The following table lists council wards, communities and associated geographical areas. Communities with a community council are indicated with a '*':

Ward	Communities	Other geographic areas
Abersychan	Abersychan	Varteg, Cwmavon, Cwmffrwd, Talywain, The British, Pentwyn, Garndiffaith,
Blaenavon	Blaenavon Town*	Coed Cae, Elgam, Forge Side, Garn-y-erw
Brynwern	Pontymoile (Brynwern ward)	
Coed Eva	Fairwater (Coed Eva ward)	
Croesyceiliog North	Croesyceiliog & Llanyrafon* (Croesyceiliog North ward)	
Croesyceiliog South	Croesyceiliog & Llanyrafon* (Croesyceiliog South ward)	
Cwmynyscoy	Pontymoile (Cwmynyscoy ward)	Blaendare, Upper Race
Fairwater	Fairwater (Fairwater and Oaksford ward)	Ty Canol
Greenmeadow	Fairwater (Greenmeadow ward)	
Llantarnam	Llantarnam; Cwmbran Central* (Southville ward)	Croes-y-mwyalach, Oakfield, Old Cwmbran
Llanyrafon North	Llanyrafon (Llanyrafon North ward)	
Llanyrafon South	Ponthir*; Llanyrafon (Llanyrafon South ward)	Llanfrechfa
New Inn	New Inn	Cwmoody, Sluvad
Panteg	Panteg	Griffithstown, Sebastopol
Pontnewydd	Pontnewydd; Cwmbran Central* (Northville ward)	Pontrhydyrun, Lowland, Northville
Pontnewynydd	Pen Tranch (Pontnewynydd ward)	Cwmffrwdoer
Pontypool	Pontymoile*	
Snatchwood	Pen Tranch (Snatchwood ward)	
St. Cadocs and Penygarn		
St Dials	Cwmbran Central* (St. Dials ward)	
Trevethin	Trevethin (Trevethin ward)	
Two Locks	Cwmbran Central* (Two Locks ward); Henllys	Hollybush
Upper Cwmbran	Upper Cwmbran	Thornhill, West Pontnewydd
Wainfelin	Pen Tranch (Wainfelin ward)	Tranch, Pantygasseg
