= Boating lake =

Lake used for recreational boating

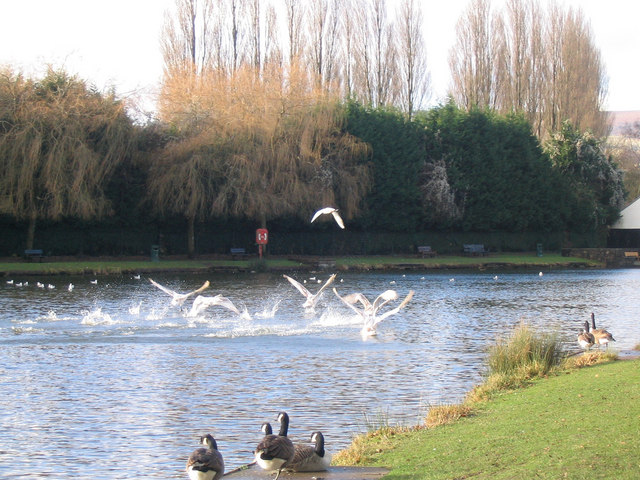
Boating Lake Park in Cwmbran, Torfaen, Wales.

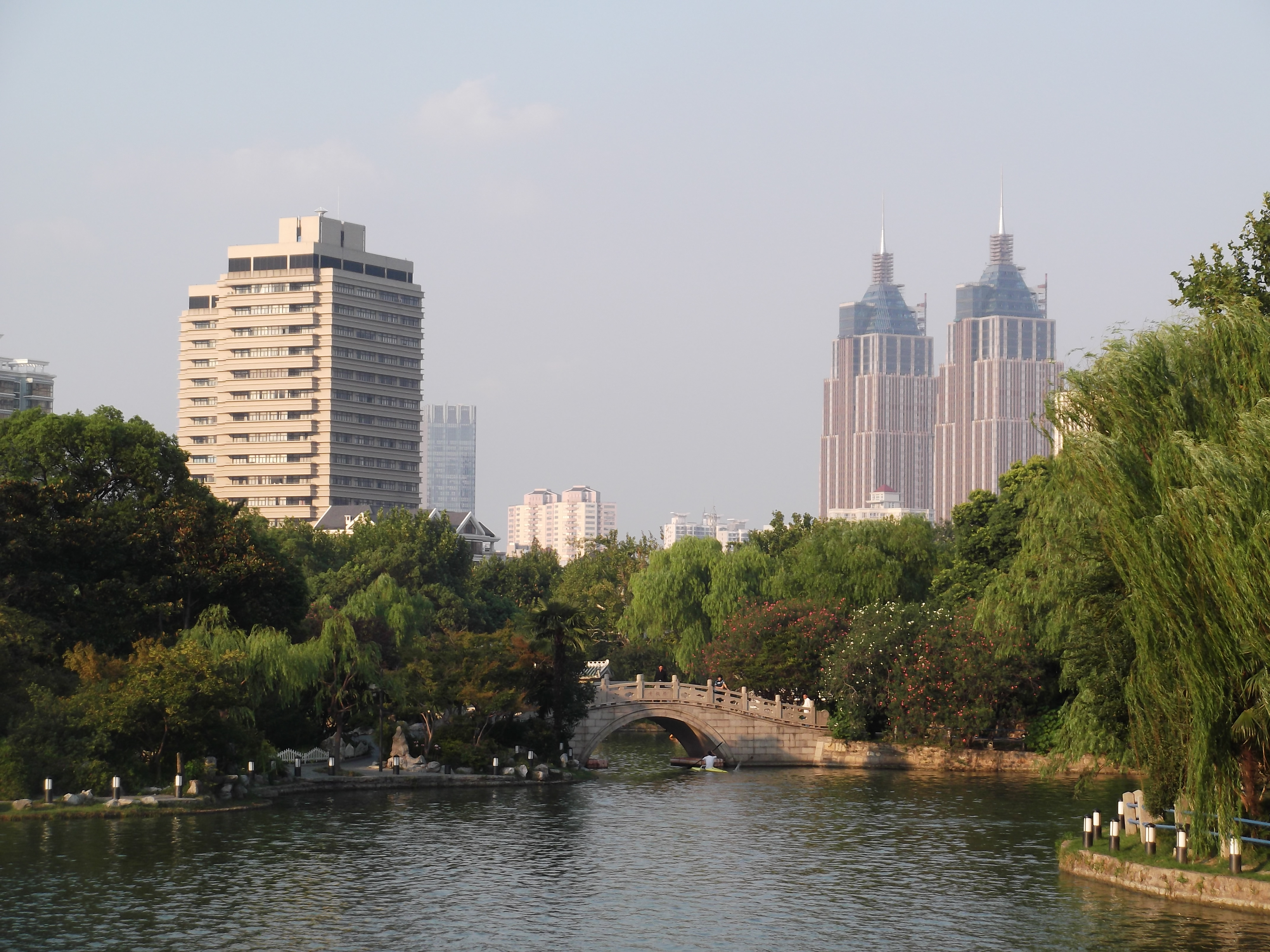
View of the boating lake in Changfeng Park, west Shanghai, China.

A boating lake is a lake used for recreational boating.

Such lakes are often in parks and can be artificially made. Some boating lakes are used for model boats.
