= Llantarnam School =

Location
- Llantarnam Road; Cwmbran, Torfaen, NP44 3XB; Wales; 51°38′11″N 3°00′23″W

Information
- Type: State-funded comprehensive school
- Established: 25 September 1954
- Closed: 17 July 2015
- Local authority: Torfaen County Borough Council
- Head Teacher: Gareth Whitcombe
- Gender: Coeducational
- Age: 11 to 19
- Enrolment: 1400
- Website: http://www.llantarnamschool.net/

Llantarnam School (Welsh: Ysgol Llantarnam) was a state-funded and non-selective comprehensive school in the Llantarnam suburb of Cwmbran, Torfaen in Wales.

== History ==
Construction began in 1950 and was the first of three secondary modern schools to be built in Cwmbran New Town. It became a comprehensive in 1971 with extensions such as the sixth form building, sports hall and leisure center built by 1975. As part of Torfaen County's 21st century programme, Llantarnam closed in 2015 and was merged with Fairwater High on the latter site to form the larger Cwmbran High School. Llantarnam itself provided education for approximately 1,400 students between the ages of 11 and 19.

The school had been placed on special measures, after the publication of an unsatisfactory Estyn inspection report in November 2012.

== Site layout ==
The school was split into three main buildings, named Ebbw, Llwyd, Usk and Monnow after the local Ebbw River, Afon Llwyd, River Usk and River Monnow. Two smaller buildings were referred to as the Design Technology Block and the Science Block.

Each of the three main buildings had three storeys or levels. The school's main canteen was located in Llwyd Building. A second canteen in Usk Building became the Sixth Form study area.

Usk Building also contained the headteacher's office as well as the other main school administrative offices.

== Redevelopment ==
The school site is now a new housing development called St. Michael's Gate, with the playing fields now part of the new Llantarnam Primary School, having replaced the original in Oakfield which was demolished in 2017. That too is now a new housing development called Oakfield Grange.
