= Boating Lake Park =

Public park in Cwmbran, Wales

Coordinates: 51°38′27″N 3°00′27″W

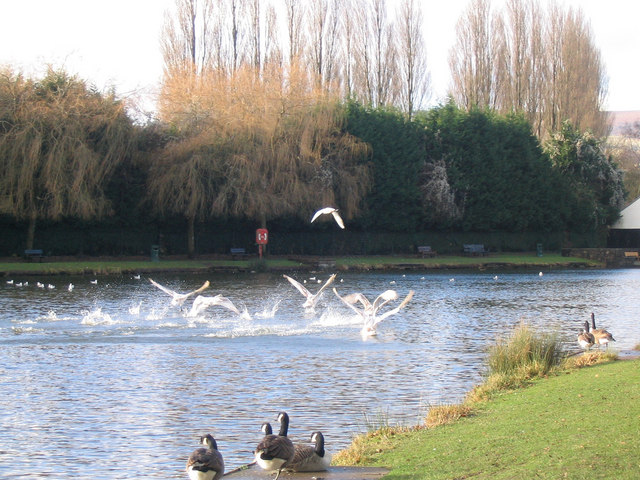
View of the lake.

The Boating Lake Park (Welsh: Llyn Cychod Cwmbrân; officially named the Crow Valley Central Recreation Grounds) is a large public park in Cwmbran, Torfaen in Wales. As its name suggests, the park features a boating lake. There are in fact two lakes, the larger being home to various wetland birds and the smaller being the actual boating one. Water area is 5 acres (20,000 m^{2}). The park is bordered by Afon Llwyd on one side and a railway line on the other.

The park is quite expansive and includes a large adventure playground, a skate park and various sports pitches. The northern end of the park is in the Cwmbran suburb of Southville, whereas the southern end is in Llanyrafon.

The lake has just undergone a £250,000 refurbishment project which includes new trees and plants a marginal and bog area around the entire pond and a small island which will act as a refuge for wildlife. Improvements have also been made to the paths around the lake which include small areas of wooden decking and the new path which runs along the river. Work began on the improvements in January and were completed in June 2009.

The boating lake has the opportunity for children and adults to use peddle boats and row boats across both ponds.

Cwmbran boating lake has picnic areas around the park, and a cafe.
