= Stephen Senior =

Welsh politician

Stephen Senior MS
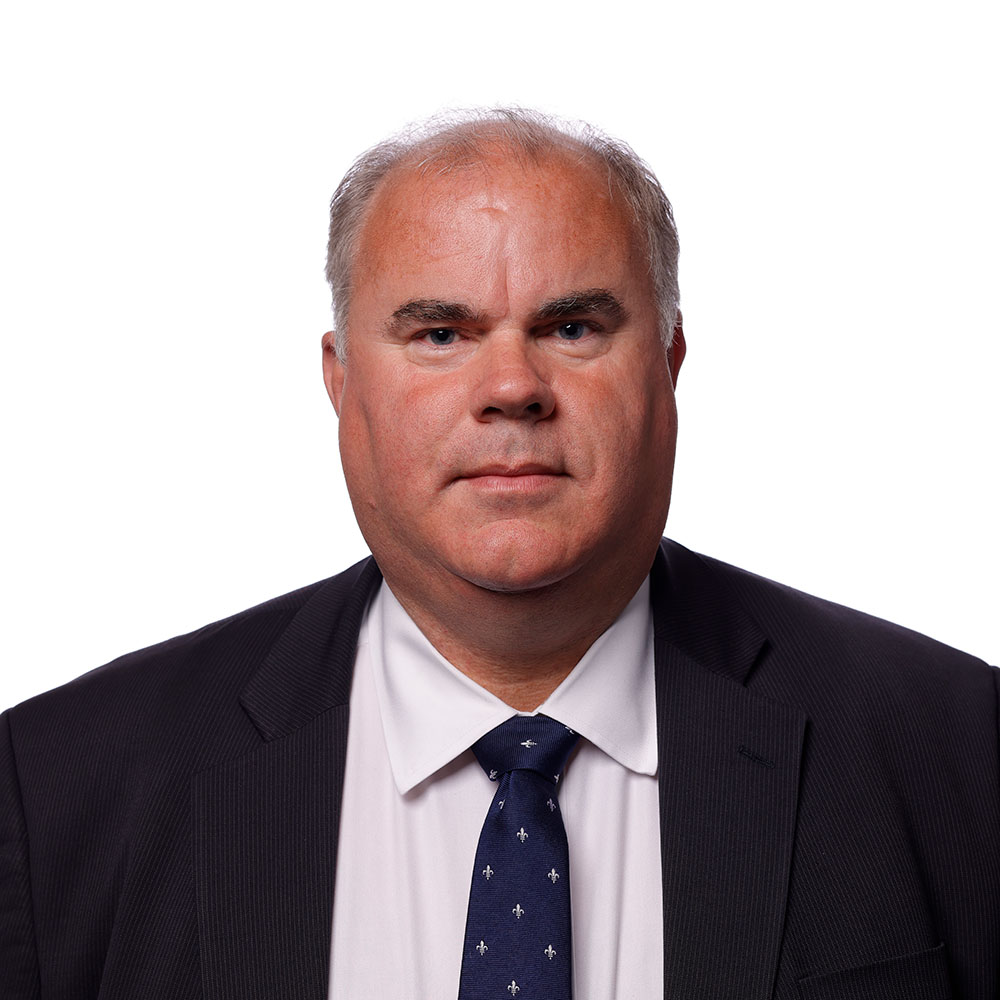
- Official portrait, 2026

Shadow Cabinet Minister for Education
- Incumbent
- Assumed office 23 September 2026
- Leader: Helen Jenner
- Preceded by: Helen Jenner

Member of the Senedd for Sir Fynwy Torfaen
- Incumbent
- Assumed office 8 May 2026
- Preceded by: Constituency established

Personal details
- Born: Stephen John Senior
- Party: Reform UK
- Other political affiliations: Conservative (before 2025)

Stephen John Senior is a Welsh politician serving as a Member of the Senedd for Sir Fynwy Torfaen representing Reform UK.

== Political career ==
Senior was previously a member of the Welsh Conservatives, having competed unsuccessfully with the Tories in the 2017 and 2022 Torfaen County Borough Council elections, as well as for the 2023 Llantarnam by-election.

In February 2025 Senior stood successfully for the Pontypool Community Council winning against the Labour candidate. In May 2025 he changed his political affiliations to be a Reform UK Community Council.

It was announced that Senior was selected in the second position on the Reform seat list for the Sir Fynwy Torfaen seat. He was elected on the 7 May.
