= Croesyceiliog School =

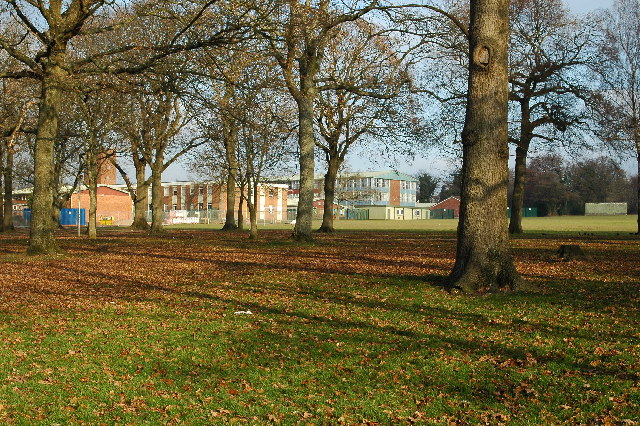
- The school in 2005

Location
- Woodland Road; Croesyceiliog, Cwmbran, Torfaen, NP44 2YB; South Wales; 51°39′17″N 3°00′24″W

Information
- Motto: Learning, Respect, Ambition
- Established: 5 November 1957 (Sec Mod); 3 February 1960 (Grammar); 1 September 1970 (Bilateral); 1 September 1971 (Comp)
- Founders: Colin Jones, Steven Leyshon
- Local authority: Torfaen
- Department for Education URN: 401853 Tables
- Ofsted: Reports
- Headteacher: Alun Davies (acting)
- Deputy Headteacher: Daniel Mutlow
- Staff: 95
- Gender: Coeducational
- Age: 11 to 16
- Enrolment: 1607
- Colours: Blue & Yellow
- Former Name: Croesyceiliog Grammar & Secondary Modern Schools
- Website: http://www.croesyceiliog.org.uk

Croesyceiliog School (Welsh: Ysgol Croes-y-ceiliog) is a state-funded secondary school in the Croesyceiliog area of Cwmbran, in South Wales, UK.

== Setting ==
Situated on high ground that overlooks the valley westwards, the school site lies within the parish of Llanyrafon, with the Croesyceiliog By-Pass (A4042) and the headquarters of Gwent Police to the east, and the Afon Llwyd to the west.

Most pupils live in the areas of Croesyceiliog, Llanyrafon and Pontnewydd; however the Sixth Form attracts students from as far as parts of Newport and Pontypool.

The school grounds also host a local youth centre. The school is sited on 42 acres (17 ha) of land; the average for schools is 18 acres (7.3 ha). Cwmbran's river (the Afon Llwyd) is at the lower western end of the site. The school is surrounded by woodland: Jim Crow's Wood to the north and Middle Wood to the south.

== History ==
=== Foundation ===
Cwmbran New Town was established in 1949, and the Development Corporation's Master Plan stated that three secondary modern schools would be built in the new town. Croesyceiliog, however, would be a "campus" with a grammar school and a community college built alongside it. The school was designed by the Monmouthshire County Architect, Colin Jones. The secondary modern was opened on 5 November 1957, followed by the grammar school on 3 February 1960. Colin Jones died before the grammar school was completed. In 1960, the final costs of construction for the campus had reached £250,000.

=== Comprehensive ===
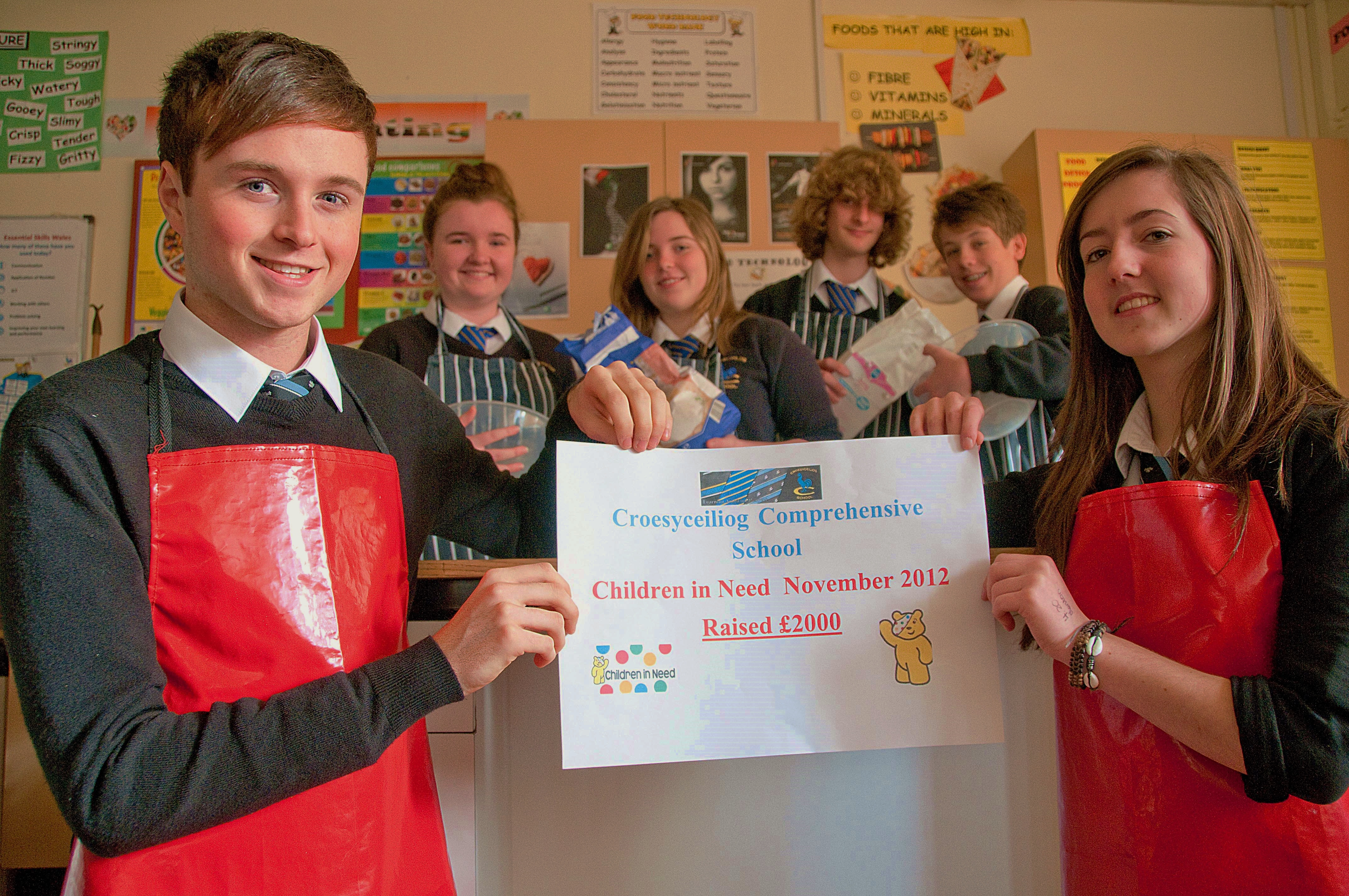
Children in Need Day at the school

In September 1970, the campus of the two schools and college merged to form the Croesyceiliog Bilateral School, where the Secondary Modern (East) buildings housed the lower three forms, and the Grammar (West) buildings housed the upper three. It was officially named Croesyceiliog Comprehensive School the following year. In January 1975 the new Sixth Form building opened in the centre of the school. In the 1970s and 80s, a dozen prefabricated buildings were constructed around the school as the pupil population reached nearly 2,000. Three of the prefabs remain as Welsh language classrooms and a fourth was rebuilt as a Youth Centre behind the Community College (now Music suite). In 2006 a Fitness Suite opened to the rear of the West Gymnasiums, and in 2010 a perimeter fence was installed surrounding the entire site.

In the 2005 inspection the school had one of the best reports in the county.

In 2006, Deputy Prime Minister John Prescott visited the school.

In 2012, Crownbridge School, an education centre aimed at children aged 11–19 with learning or physical disabilities was built on playing fields south of the school site. The previous Crownbridge School, situated on Greenhill Road in Sebastapol, had fallen into disrepair.

In July 2017, plans were submitted for the "demolition of existing school buildings and erection of a new three storey 11-16 school building, the erection of a new two storey Sixth Form and sports block (D1 educational use), the construction of a new, floodlit artificial grass pitch (AGP), a new access junction, external play and sport areas, car parking, associated infrastructure and landscaping on the site". In March 2018, the plans were amended to exclude a Sixth Form provision, as a new post-16 education facility was to be constructed on land east of Cwmbran Centre, set to be opened by September 2020.

The school came in for heavy criticism from the South Wales Argus and The Daily Telegraph after encouraging a teacher not to pursue action, after a coke can was dropped by a pupil and hit her on the head. School staff informed police that they did not want an investigation for fear of "criminalising children". Moreover, in 2017, the school decided to review its uniform policy, after parents complained that the school refused pupils' requests to remove jumpers during a heat wave.

In 2022, Natalie Richards replaced Elspeth Lewis as Headteacher of Croesyceiliog School.

== List of Head Teachers ==
- Granville Lewis Pomeroy (1916–1991), in post 1957–1970: Pomeroy was the headmaster of the Secondary Modern School and the Community College. Following the merger in 1970, Pomeroy became headteacher of Caerleon Comprehensive School.
- Dr Donald John B. Summers CBE (1909–1999), in post 1960–1975: Summers attended Oxford University, where he studied Chemistry, and later completed his PhD. He was known for wearing the traditional headmaster's gown. He was the first and last headmaster of the Grammar School, as well as holding the position of headmaster for the Secondary Modern from 1970 until its merger with the Grammar School in 1971 and of the Comprehensive School entirely until 1975.
- Mike J. Pugh, in post 1975–1991: oversaw the introduction of GCSE and A-Level qualifications following the Education Reform Act in 1988.
- Helene Mansfield OBE, in post 1991–2009: The longest-serving and first female headteacher of Croesyceiliog, Mansfield was born in Brittany, and studied languages for her research year at Downing College, Cambridge.
- Sarah Jane Logan, in post 2009–2013: Logan was previously deputy headmistress of Bassaleg School.
- David Taylor, in post 2013–2020: Taylor oversaw the construction of a new Croesyceiliog School, which was opened in September 2019, and the demolition of the entire former campus thereafter.
- Elspeth Lewis, in post 2020–2022
- Natalie Richards, in post 2022–2026
- Alun Davies, in post 2026–present: Alun Davies is currently acting as headteacher while an official headteacher is chosen to replace Natalie Richards.

== Notable former pupils ==
- Nick Ramsay, the Conservative MS for Monmouth between 2007 and 2021
- Jessica Morden, Labour MP since 2005 for Newport East
- Adam Hughes, Newport Gwent Dragons and Wales U20 rugby
- Terry Morgan, CBE, former MD of Land Rover and now Chairman of Crossrail.
- Natasha Cockram, Welsh Marathon runner
- Helen Weston, former Wales netball international.

=== Croesyceiliog Grammar School ===
- Rt Rev Gregory Cameron, Bishop of St Asaph since 2009.
- Green Gartside, of pop band Scritti Politti.
- Denise Kingsmill, Baroness Kingsmill
- Jeremy Winston, Dean of Monmouth
