= Jason O'Connell =

Welsh politician

Jason O'Connell MS
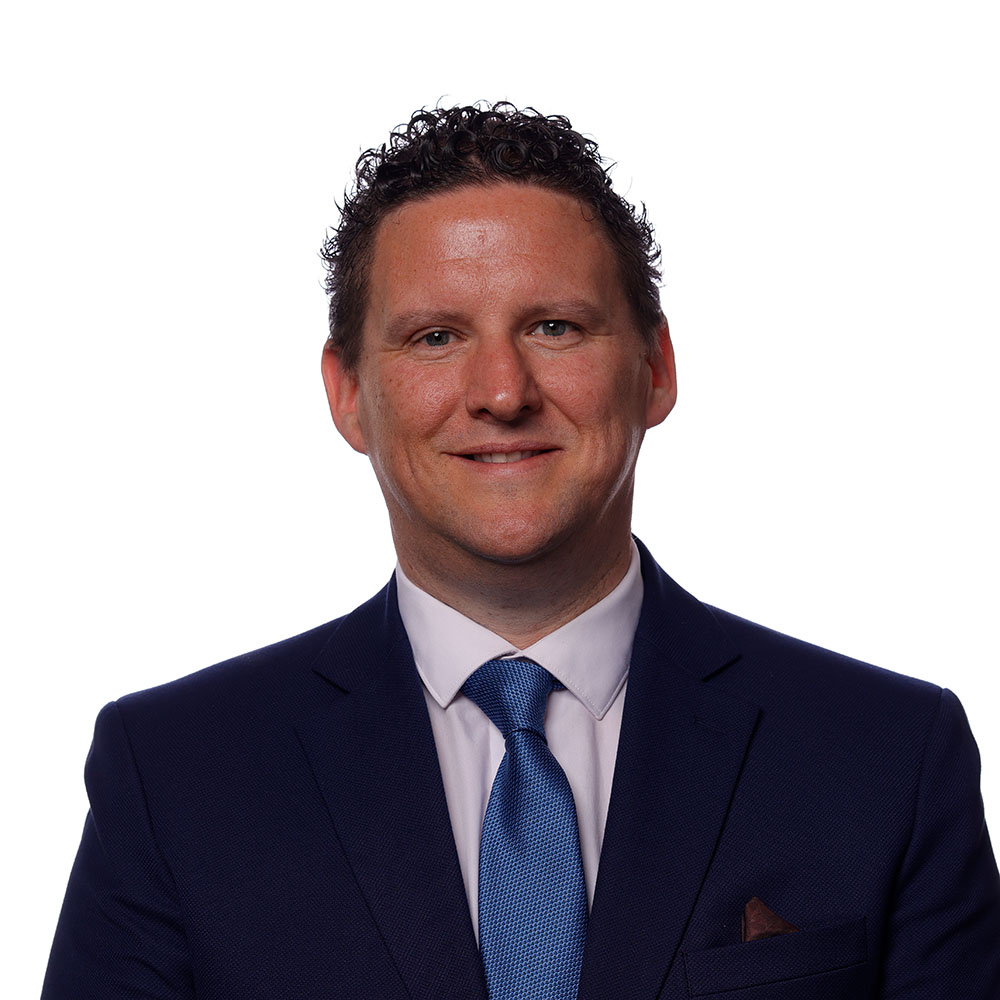
- Official portrait, 2026

Member of the Senedd for Pontypridd Cynon Merthyr
- Incumbent
- Assumed office 8 May 2026

Torfaen County Borough Councillor for Llantarnam
- In office 2 February 2023 – 9 May 2026
- Preceded by: Nick Jones
- Succeeded by: Jonathan Hollins

Torfaen County Borough Councillor for Greenmeadow
- In office 4 May 2017 – 5 May 2022
- Preceded by: Robert Wellington
- Succeeded by: Seat abolished

Personal details
- Party: Reform UK (since 2024)
- Other political affiliations: Independent (2017–2018; 2019–2024); Conservative (2018–2019)

Jason O'Connell is a Welsh politician who has served as a Member of the Senedd (MS) for Pontypridd Cynon Merthyr since 2026.

Originally elected as an independent, and briefly serving as a Conservative, before defecting to Reform UK Wales in 2024, he served as the Torfaen County Borough Councillor for Greenmeadow from 2017 to 2022, and for Llantarnam from 2023 to 2026.

== Political career ==
In 2017, O'Connell was elected as an Independent politician to represent the Greenmeadow ward on Torfaen Council. In September 2018, he joined the Welsh Conservative group on the council, after the election of Paul Davies as Leader of the Welsh Conservatives, describing his appointment as 'exciting'. He left the Welsh Conservatives at some point between 17 November and 9 December 2019. He ran again as an independent again at the 2022 local elections. He was not elected.

O'Connell ran to represent the Llantarnam ward during a 2023 by-election, and was elected, again as an independent. In August 2024, alongside the other two councillors for his ward, O'Connell joined Reform UK Wales, becoming one of the party's first councillors in Wales.

In March 2026, O'Connell was announced as Reform's lead candidate for the Pontypridd Cynon Merthyr constituency, despite representing a council ward in the Sir Fynwy Torfaen constituency. This triggered resignations from several other candidates running in Pontypridd Cynon Merthyr, who alleged that O'Connell, and other candidates, was a parachute candidate, and criticised the lack of local control in candidate selection within Reform. He was successfully elected to Senedd in the May 2026 Senedd election.

In October 2026, he became the first member of the Senedd to make a speech using smartglasses. As a result the leader Welsh Liberal Democrats Jane Dodds called for a ban of their use in the chamber. A debate on the rules on their use was raised prompting a review by the parliamentary staff.
