= Living Hope Church =

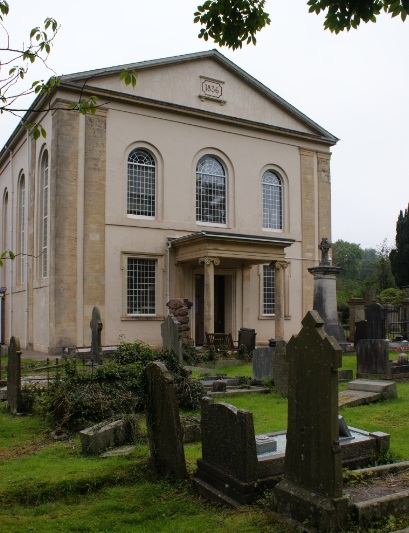
- Living Hope Church built in 1836
- Living Hope Church
- 51.6660°N 3.0080°W
- Address: Chapel Lane, Croesyceiliog, NP44 2ND
- Country: United Kingdom
- Denomination: Evangelical Baptist
- Website: www.pbce.org.uk

History
- Founded: 1815
- Founder: George Conway

Architecture
- Architectural type: Classic Style
- Years built: 1836
- Construction cost: £2,000

Clergy
- Pastor: Jonny Raine

Living Hope Church (formerly known as Pontrhydyrun Baptist Church) is an historic church located in Croesyceiliog in Cwmbran. Founded in the early 19th century, it has played a significant role in the religious and social life of the local community. The current building was completed in 1836 and it became a Grade II listed building on 1 May 1951. The church changed its name to Living Hope Church in September 2026.
