= Henllys, Torfaen =

Henllys
- Location within Torfaen
- Population: 2,682
- OS grid reference: ST 26771 93647
  - Cardiff: 17.7 mi (28.5 km)
- Principal area: Torfaen
- Preserved county: Gwent
- Country: Wales
- Sovereign state: United Kingdom
- Post town: CWMBRAN
- Postcode district: NP44
- Police: Gwent
- Fire: South Wales
- Ambulance: Welsh
- UK Parliament: Torfaen
- Senedd Cymru – Welsh Parliament: Torfaen
- List of places UK Wales Torfaen 51.638942°N 3.04175°W Map of the community

Henllys is a residential area and community on the edge of Cwmbran, Torfaen, in south-east Wales, with a population of 2,682 as of the 2011 census. The name means 'ancient court' (hen 'ancient' and llys 'court'). It was a former administrative court of the lordship of Machen.

== See also ==
- Cwmbran
- Torfaen County Borough Council
- Grade II* listed buildings in Torfaen
- Scheduled Monuments in Torfaen
- Communities of Torfaen
