= Pen Tranch =

Pen Tranch: Welsh: Pen Transh
- Location within Torfaen
- Area: 12.06 km^{2} (4.66 sq mi)
- Population: 5,989
  - Density: 497/km^{2} (1,290/sq mi)
- OS grid reference: SO 272 007
- Community: Pen Tranch
- Principal area: Torfaen
- Preserved county: Gwent
- Country: Wales
- Sovereign state: United Kingdom
- Post town: PONTYPOOL
- Postcode district: NP4
- Dialling code: 01495
- Police: Gwent
- Fire: South Wales
- Ambulance: Welsh
- UK Parliament: Torfaen
- Senedd Cymru – Welsh Parliament: Torfaen
- List of places UK Wales Torfaen 51.700758°N 3.054092°W Map of the community

Pen Tranch (Welsh: Pen Transh) is a community in Torfaen, South East Wales.

It lies to the west of Pontypool in the valley leading west to Crumlin. It lies in the historic county of Monmouthshire and the preserved county of Gwent.

The area includes the electoral wards of Pontnewynydd, Snatchwood, and Wainfelin for Pontypool Community Council.
