= Fairwater, Torfaen =

Fairwater
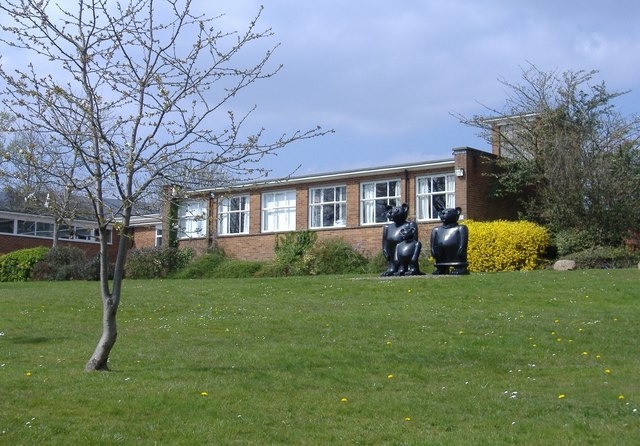
- Fairwater Primary School

- Location within Torfaen
- Area: 5.24 km^{2} (2.02 sq mi)
- Population: 11,632 (2011)
  - Density: 2,220/km^{2} (5,700/sq mi)
- OS grid reference: ST 276 945
- Community: Fairwater
- Principal area: Torfaen
- Preserved county: Gwent
- Country: Wales
- Sovereign state: United Kingdom
- Post town: CWMBRAN
- Postcode district: NP44
- Dialling code: 01633
- Police: Gwent
- Fire: South Wales
- Ambulance: Welsh
- UK Parliament: Torfaen
- Senedd Cymru – Welsh Parliament: Torfaen
- List of places UK Wales Torfaen 51.64462°N 3.04773°W Map of the community

Fairwater is a community and suburb of Cwmbran in the county borough of Torfaen, in south east Wales, and was built by the Cwmbran Development Corporation between 1963 and 1966.

== Development ==
Cwmbran was the only new town in Wales designated by the New Towns Act 1946. Cwmbran Development Corporation was formed in 1949 to develop the new town and building of seven new residential areas (Coed Eva, Croesyceiliog North and South, Greenmeadow, Oakfield, Pontnewydd, and St Dials) began in 1951, later followed by Llanyrafon.

By 1962, when Gordon Redfern took over as chief architect of the corporation, the increased use of cars had to be accommodated in the layout of further housing estates, and Redfern adopted the Radburn system, used most rigidly in Fairwater (built between 1963 and 1966).

== Notable buildings ==
The remains of Llanderfel Chapel, a medieval chapel important as a stopping point on a pilgrims' route to Penrhys, are in Fairwater. The pilgrim route is now part of the modern long distance Cistercian Way footpath. The remains are a scheduled monument.

Near the site of the chapel is Llanderfel Farm, a 16th-17th century Grade II listed building. Also nearby is Ty'r Ywen Farmhouse and barn which are both 17th century Grade II listed buildings.

== Education ==
There are three primary (infant and junior) schools in Fairwater community:

- Blenheim Road Community Primary(formerly fairwater infant and juniors )
- Coed Eva Primary
- Henllys Church in Wales Primary
- Nant Celyn Primary

Cwmbran High (one of two secondary schools in Cwmbran, the other is Croesyceiliog School) is also located in Fairwater.

== Governance ==
The community of Fairwater also includes the estates of Coed Eva, Greenmeadow, and Ty Canol, and includes three electoral wards for Torfaen County Borough Council:

- Coed Eva, which returns 1 councillor
- Fairwater, which returns 2 councillors
- Greenmeadow, which returns 2 councillors
