= Pontypool Town Hall =

Municipal Building in Pontypool, Wales

- Neuadd y Dref Pont-y-pŵl (Welsh)
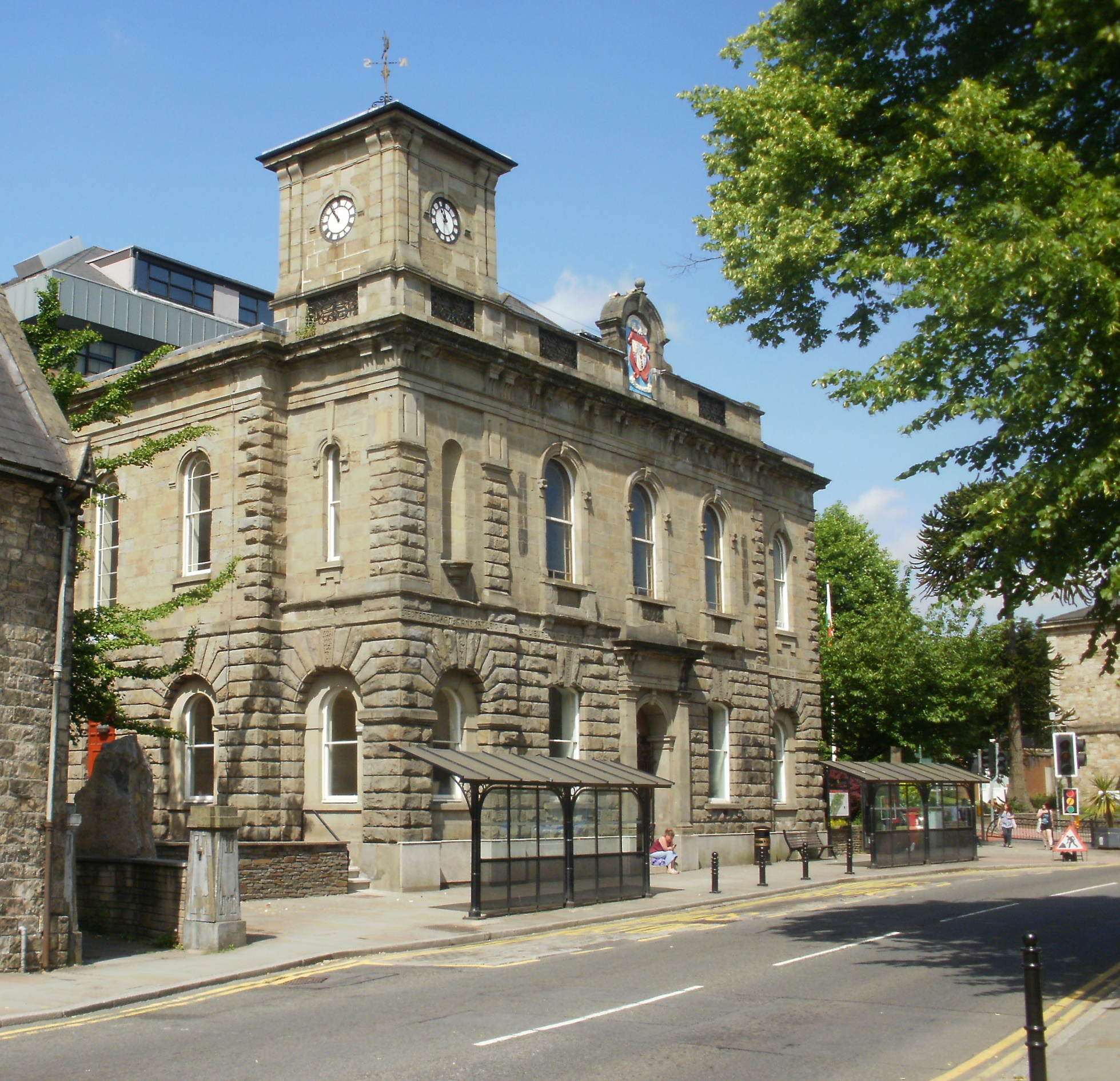
- Pontypool Town Hall

- Shown in Torfaen
- 51.7014°N 3.0400°W
- Location: Hanbury Road, Pontypool

History
- Built: 1856

Site notes
- Architect(s): Bidlake and Lovett
- Architectural style: Italianate style

Listed Building – Grade II
- Official name: Town Hall
- Designated: 9 January 1974
- Reference no.: 3132

Pontypool Town Hall (Welsh: Neuadd y Dref Pont-y-pŵl) is a municipal structure in Hanbury Road, Pontypool, Wales. The town hall, which forms the original part of a civic centre that now serves as the headquarters of Torfaen County Borough Council, is a Grade II listed building.

== History ==
Until the opening of the town hall, Pontypool did not have a hall for the transaction of public business, a fact which was considered by the local newspaper to be "anomalous". The town hall was a gift to the town from the Lord Lieutenant of Monmouthshire, Capel Hanbury Leigh, whose seat was at Pontypool Park, to celebrate the birth of his son. The foundation stone for the building was laid by Mrs Hanbury Leigh on 15 May 1854. It was designed by Bidlake and Lovett of Wolverhampton in the Italianate style, was built in ashlar stone by William Prosser of Abergavenny and was officially opened on 5 January 1856. The official opening was celebrated with an evening concert which was attended by Mr and Mrs Hanbury Leigh.

The design involved an asymmetrical main frontage with five bays facing onto Hanbury Road with the left hand end bay slightly projected forward and topped with a small clock tower and the right hand end bay slightly set back; the two end bays originally had openings on the ground floor. The central bay featured a doorway with an arched surround flanked by Tuscan order pilasters supporting an entablature and a canopy; above the ground floor, which was rusticated, was a band inscribed with the name of the benefactor and the date of opening. There were rounded headed sash windows in the other bays on the ground floor and on the first floor, except for the left hand end bay on the first floor which contained a niche. At roof level there was a frieze with triglyphs and a parapet bearing the Hanbury coat of arms.

In the mid-19th century the town was managed by magistrates but a local board of health was established in 1871 and, following population growth largely associated with the tinplate industry, the area became an urban district with the town hall as its headquarters in 1895. The town hall was also the meeting place for hearings of the county court. The town hall continued to serve as the headquarters of the urban district for much of the 20th century and remained the local seat of government after the enlarged Torfaen County Borough Council was formed in 1974.

A programme of works was undertaken to a design by the David Preece Partnership, to extend the building to the south west thereby creating a modern civic centre, in 1991. The works involved the demolition of an old police station and an old town gaol and the construction of a modern six-storey office block.
