= Economic activity rate =

Economic activity rate, EAR (or labor force participation rate, LFPR) is the percentage of the population, both employed and unemployed, that constitutes the workforce, regardless of whether they are currently employed or job searching.

This figure is a measure of the degree of success of the economy in engaging the population in some form of production of services or goods.

== Calculation and interpretation ==
The economic activity rate is calculated as the ratio of the labour force to the total working-age population. The labour force consists of all persons who are either employed or unemployed but actively seeking work, while the working-age population generally includes individuals above a specified minimum age, excluding those not participating in the labour market such as full-time students, retirees, or discouraged workers, depending on national definitions.

Economists use the economic activity rate to assess the extent to which an economy is able to mobilize its working-age population for productive activity. Changes in the rate may reflect demographic trends, educational participation, social policies, or cyclical economic conditions. A rising activity rate is often associated with increased labour market engagement, while a declining rate may indicate population ageing, extended education, or withdrawal from the labour market during economic downturns.
