= Varteg =

Village in Torfaen, Wales

Coordinates: 51°44′52″N 3°03′58″W

Varteg is a village in the county borough of Torfaen in Wales.

== Location ==
It lies near Abersychan on the hills above the valley of Afon Llwyd, between Pontypool and Blaenavon.

== History and amenities ==
Varteg owes its origin to the fact that the land lease for the Blaenavon Ironworks was too big, and portions were sublet to the Nantyglo Company and part taken up by a partnership called Knight and Company which opened an iron furnace in 1802. By 1825 the Varteg works was taken over by Kenrick and Company which had three blast furnaces, by 1839 there were five furnaces in operation. In 1847 it was owned by Williams and Co with a total of eight furnaces at Varteg, Golynos and Pentwyn. From 1854 to closure in 1868 it was owned by the Golynos Iron Co. After the end of iron making, coal mining became the biggest employer.

Varteg has one of the three Welsh language medium primary school in Torfaen, namely Ysgol Bryn Onnen. The others are Ysgol Gymraeg Cwmbrân, in Cwmbran, and Ysgol Panteg, in Griffithstown.

It also has a cemetery which dates back to the 18th century.

In 2013, a controversy erupted when Glamorgan Power chose a site for open coal mining 120 metres away from the village's primary school, Ysgol Bryn Onnen. The Torfaen council previously rejected the company's plans to mine more than 256,000 tonnes of coal from the area, citing Welsh environmental regulations requiring a buffer zone of at least 500 metres around any planned open-cast mining operations. The headmaster of Ysgol Bryn Onnen school, Ryan Parry, spoke against the proposal, citing health concerns and impact on learning.

Also in 2013, the village made international headlines when it was reported the Welsh Language Commissioner had proposed changing the official spelling of the village's name to Y Farteg in-line with Welsh orthography. Thirteen years later, following a consultation, the commissioner and Torfaen County Borough Council agreed to use 'Varteg' as the Welsh name.
