= Wainfelin =

Coordinates: 51°42′27″N 03°03′02″W

Wainfelin: Welsh: Waunfelin
- Population: 2,434 (2011)
- OS grid reference: SO275015
- Principal area: Torfaen
- Preserved county: Gwent
- Country: Wales
- Sovereign state: United Kingdom
- Post town: PONTYPOOL
- Postcode district: NP4
- Dialling code: 01495
- Police: Gwent
- Fire: South Wales
- Ambulance: Welsh
- UK Parliament: Torfaen

Wainfelin (Welsh: Waunfelin) is a suburb of Pontypool (though part of the Pen Tranch community) in the county borough of Torfaen, in south-east Wales.

== Demographics ==
At the United Kingdom Census 2001 demographics showed:

- Population 2,422 (Torfaen 90,949)
- 49.2% Male, 50.8% Female
- Ages
  - 21.4% aged between 0-15
  - 40.7% aged between 16-44
  - 21.4% aged 45–59/64
  - 16.5% of pensionable age

== Governance ==
Wainfelin forms an electoral ward electing a community councillor to Pontypool Community Council.

Until May 2022 Wainfelin was a ward to Torfaen County Borough Council. Following a 2021 boundary review, the ward was combined with the community of Pontymoile to form a new ward called Pontypool Fawr, electing three councillors.
