= Cwmynyscoy =

Suburb of Pontypool, Wales

Coordinates: 51.69123°N 3.03694°W

Cwmynyscoy, officially known by the Welsh name Cwm-ynys-cou, is a residential area in the community of Pontymoile and is a suburb of Pontypool in Torfaen, South Wales.

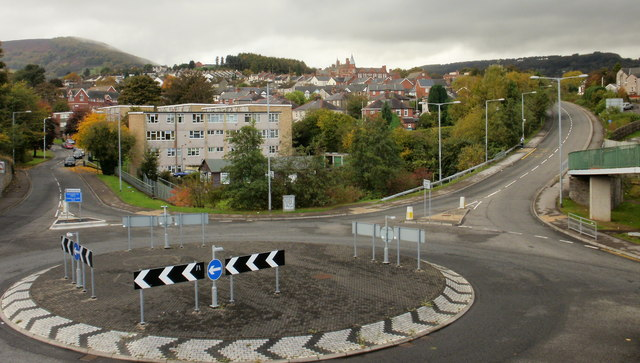

== Statistics ==
- All figures quoted have been derived from the 2001 Census unless otherwise stated.

=== Demographic Indicators ===
Total population of 1283 (Torfaen 90,949)

48.6% Male, 51.4% Female (Torfaen - 48.4% Male, 51.6% Female)

Age Structure; 19.5% aged between 0–15, 36.6% aged between 16 and 44, 25.3% aged 45–59/64 and 18.6% of pensionable age.

=== Socio-Economic Indicators ===
==== Activity Rates (2001) ====
Male (16–74) economic activity rate 63.4% (Torfaen 67.8%, Wales 67.7%), female (16–74) economic activity rate 48.9% (Torfaen 54.2%, Wales 54.5%), total economic activity rate 56.1% (Torfaen 60.8%, Wales 61.0%)

==== Unemployment (2004) ====
Whilst unemployment in the area has declined significantly and only 24 people remain registered unemployed, 16 males and 8 females (June 2004). Of the 24 claimants, 10 are under 24 years of age and 5 are registered as long-term unemployed (unemployed for over 52 weeks).

==== Home Ownership (2001) ====
Cwmynyscoy has a lower proportion of owner occupied households at 64.9% than Torfaen 68.3% and Wales as a whole 71.3%. 28.4% of properties are rented from the local authority (Torfaen 22.8%, Wales 13.7%)

==== Car Ownership (2001) ====
32.7% of households in Cwmynyscoy do not own a car (Torfaen 27.2%, Wales 26.0%).

==== Education (2001) ====
Residents qualified to Level 4/5: 8.9% (Torfaen 13.6%, Wales 17.4%). (Level 4/5: First degree, Higher degree, NVQ levels 4 and 5, HNC, HND, Qualified Teacher Status, Qualified Medical Doctor, Qualified Dentist, Qualified Nurse, Midwife, Health Visitor)

==== Lone Parent Families (2001) ====
10.9% of households in Cwmynyscoy are occupied by lone parents (Torfaen 10.8%, Wales 10.6%).

== Governance ==
Cwmynyscoy is the name of an electoral ward to Pontypool Community Council, electing one community councillor. For elections to Torfaen County Borough Council, it is part of the Pontypool Fawr ward, which elects three county borough councillors.

== Nature reserve ==
Cwmynyscoy Quarry is a local nature reserve, within a disused quarry, home to a number of species including noctule bats and barn owls.
