= Coed Eva =

Coordinates: 51.63745°N 3.04468°W

Coed Eva: Welsh: Coed Efa
- Population: 2,395 (Census 2001)
- OS grid reference: ST278937
- Principal area: Torfaen
- Preserved county: Gwent
- Country: Wales
- Sovereign state: United Kingdom
- Post town: CWMBRAN
- Postcode district: NP44
- Dialling code: 01633
- Police: Gwent
- Fire: South Wales
- Ambulance: Welsh
- UK Parliament: Torfaen

Coed Eva (Welsh: Coed Efa) is a suburb of Cwmbran, though in the community of Fairwater, in Torfaen County Borough, Wales. It lies in the preserved county of Gwent and within the historic boundaries of Monmouthshire.

Coed Eva is also an electoral ward to Cwmbran Community Council and Torfaen County Borough Council. Since 1995 it has been represented by one county borough councillor to Torfaen Council.

== Demographics ==
At the 2001 census the following demographic data was revealed :

- Population 2,395 (Torfaen 90,949)
- 48.9% Male, 51.1% Female
- Ages
  - 22.9% aged between 0-15
  - 38.0% aged between 16-44
  - 26.7% aged 45–59/64
  - 12.4% of pensionable age
