= Ponthir =

Pont-hir
- Entering Ponthir from Llanfrechfa

- Location within Torfaen
- Area: 3.43 km^{2} (1.32 sq mi)
- Population: 1,482
  - Density: 432/km^{2} (1,120/sq mi)
- OS grid reference: ST 327 928
- Community: Ponthir
- Principal area: Torfaen
- Preserved county: Gwent
- Country: Wales
- Sovereign state: United Kingdom
- Post town: NEWPORT
- Postcode district: NP18
- Post town: CWMBRAN
- Postcode district: NP44
- Dialling code: 01633
- Police: Gwent
- Fire: South Wales
- Ambulance: Welsh
- UK Parliament: Torfaen
- Senedd Cymru – Welsh Parliament: Monmouth
- List of places UK Wales Torfaen 51.630425°N 2.972997°W Map of the community

Ponthir, officially spelled Pont-hir, is a village and community in the south-east of the county borough of Torfaen on the boundary of the counties of Monmouthshire and Newport. It is approximately six miles from Newport city centre and 3½ miles from Cwmbran, lying between the settlements of Caerleon and Llanfrechfa.

== Etymology ==
The Welsh language placename indicates the correct pronunciation; i.e. saying the 't' and 'h' separately. The name first appeared in print as Pontheere in 1605 and again as Pont hir in 1677. The name means 'long (hir) bridge (pont)' and refers to a previous bridge over the Afon Lwyd, the present one having been built in 1800.

In October 2026, it was confirmed that the official spelling is "Pont-hir" in both English and Welsh.

== History and amenities ==
Ponthir is primarily a residential area, with several new housing estates around the older village. It has a primary school, (Ponthir Church in Wales Primary School) which was for some time under threat of closure but was reprieved, and it now has the best SATs results in Torfaen. It also changed its category to a Voluntary aided school (church) school.

Ponthir has many amenities such as two nurseries, two children's playgrounds, two churches, a village hall, a cricket club (Ponthir CC), a football club (Ponthir AFC), 2 pubs - The Ponthir House and The Star, a fish and chip shop, a doctor, dentist and pharmacy. There used to be a railway station but it closed in 1962. The railway is still in use. It is surrounded by the rolling hills of Monmouthshire, many farms, and a few rivers, streams and brooks that surround or run through the village, such as; The Afon Llwyd (meaning "grey river") as well as The Sôr Brook, Cwm-ffrwd Brook and Candwr Brook

A Welsh Water sewage and water treatment plant for the surrounding area is located here, and this was where bacteria were first used to treat sewage sludge using an electrically powered aerator to circulate the sludge and ensure good microbial digestion. This process saved the local authority money as well as reducing noxious odours.

== Notable people ==
Notable people who were born, resided or were schooled in Ponthir, include the following:

- James Ball (cyclist), Great Britain Para-cyclist
- James Botham, Welsh international rugby union player, who currently plays for Cardiff Rugby. Grandson of England cricketer Sir Ian Botham, and son of former Cardiff RFC player Liam Botham
- Liam Botham, Professional sportsman in Rugby Union, Rugby League and Cricket. Son of England cricket legend Sir Ian Botham
- Natasha Cockram, Great Britain Marathon runner and 2020 British Marathon Champion. Selected to compete for Great Britain at the 2023 World Athletics Championships in Budapest and European Athletics Championships in Birmingham in 2026.
- Maggot (rapper), (real name Andrew Major) is a Welsh rapper, formerly of the Goldie Lookin Chain.
- Percy Montgomery, Former South African international rugby union player
- Callum Taylor (Welsh cricketer), Former professional cricketer with Glamorgan
