= Llanyrafon =

Llanyravon
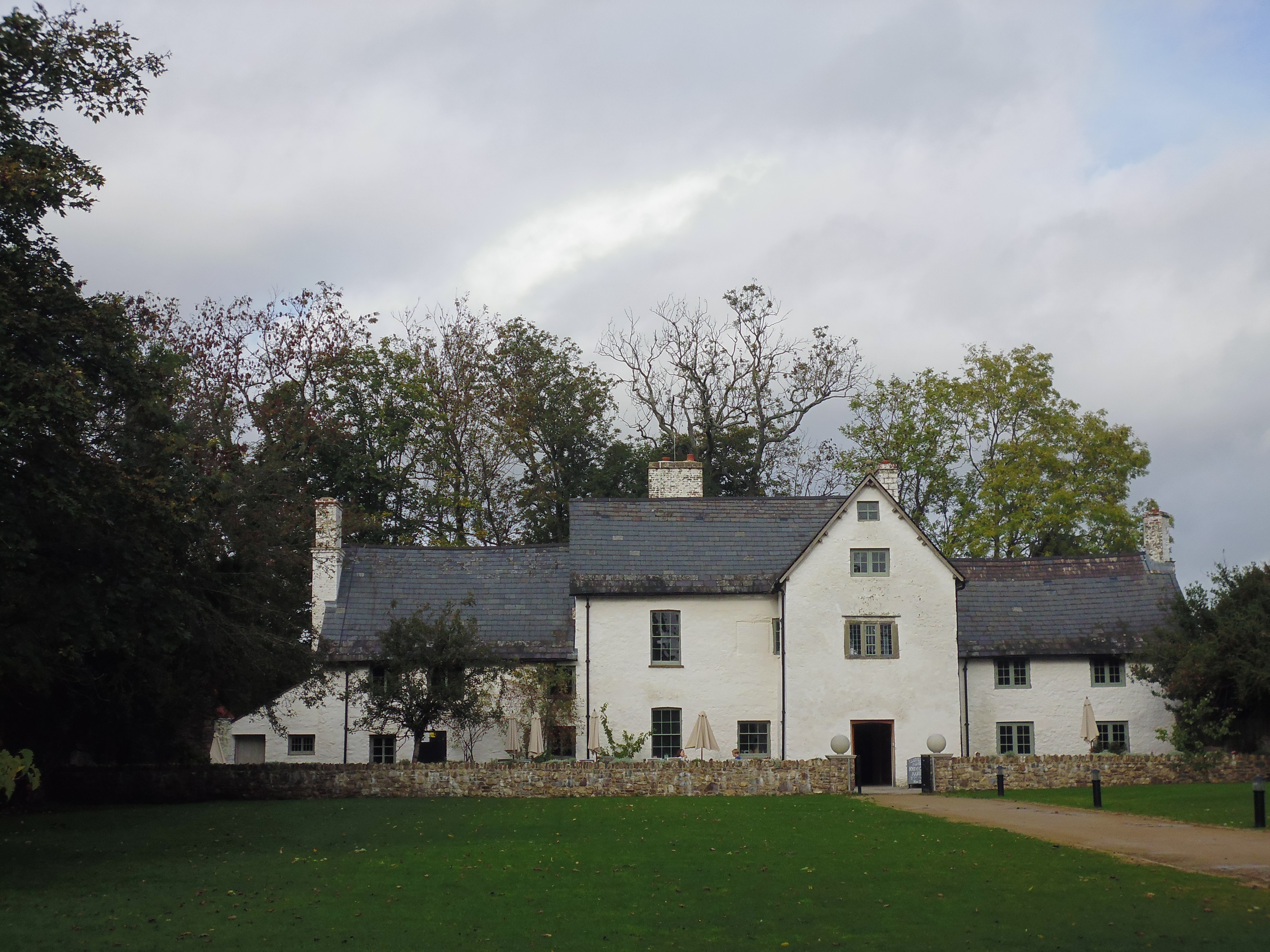
- Llanyrafon Manor

- Location within Torfaen
- Area: 3.02 km^{2} (1.17 sq mi)
- Population: 3,239 (2011)
  - Density: 1,073/km^{2} (2,780/sq mi)
- OS grid reference: ST 304 946
- Community: Llanyrafon
- Principal area: Torfaen
- Preserved county: Gwent
- Country: Wales
- Sovereign state: United Kingdom
- Post town: CWMBRAN
- Postcode district: NP44
- Dialling code: 01633
- Police: Gwent
- Fire: South Wales
- Ambulance: Welsh
- UK Parliament: Monmouth
- Senedd Cymru – Welsh Parliament: Monmouth
- List of places UK Wales Torfaen 51.64587°N 3.00729°W Map of the community

Llanyrafon, officially Llanyravon in English, is a suburb of Cwmbran and a community in the county borough of Torfaen in south east Wales. It lies within the boundaries of the historic county of Monmouthshire and the preserved county of Gwent.

== Etymology ==
Sometimes written on old maps and documents as Lan-yr-avon, Llan-yr-avon, or Llanyravon, the name literally translates as "Church by the River". However, Llan meaning "Church"' is usually followed by a saint's name, and the resulting name is usually associated with a parish church. Neither is true for Llanyrafon, so the older meaning of Llan as "an enclosed piece of land" may apply. Llan means an enclosed parcel of land belonging to a church though a church may not necessarily have been present on the land as for instance in the case of Llandaff. In which the Daff part refers to the river Taff. Such could apply to llanyrafon.

In October 2026, Torfaen County Borough Council and the Welsh Language Commissioner agreed that the official name of the place is "Llanyravon" in English and "Llanyrafon" in Welsh.

== Location ==
Llanyrafon lies to the east of the Afon Llwyd and Cwmbran town centre, west of the A4042 dual carriageway and south of Croesyceiliog.

== History ==
Built in the late 1950s, Llanyrafon is mainly residential but does include a municipal golf course; a small shopping precinct known as Llanyrafon Lakeside Shops; and the large Boating Lake Park and South Fields. The Boating Lake Park includes (as the name suggests) a large lake which is home to various wildfowl birds such as swans, mallards and moorhens. There is also a large adventure playground as well as football and rugby pitches. In recent years, the addition of a skateboarding/roller blading park was made to this area. Most recently there has been a re-vamp of the Boating Lake with the addition of an island.

== Public transport ==
The X24, a bus service operated by Stagecoach South Wales, runs through Llanyrafon from Cwmbran town centre to Newport. Phil Anslow also provides a regular service from Cwmbran town centre to Newport via Llanyrafon as well as a service which links Llanyrafon to the town centre.

== See also ==
- Cwmbran
- Torfaen County Borough Council
- Grade II* listed buildings in Torfaen
- Scheduled Monuments in Torfaen
- Communities of Torfaen
