= Snatchwood =

Suburb of Pontypool, Wales

Coordinates: 51°43′13″N 3°03′39″W

Snatchwood (Welsh: Coed-llwyd) is a small suburb to the north of Pontypool, Torfaen in Wales. It is part of the Pen Tranch community and situated between Abersychan and Pontnewynydd.

The majority (58.3 per cent) of homes in the area are owner-occupied but 14 per cent are rented from the local authority and 17.6 per cent are "other socially rented". The area has a population of 2,026

Snatchwood forms an electoral ward electing a community councillor to Pontypool Community Council.

== See also ==
- Snatchwood Halt railway station, open from 1912 to 1953
