= St Dials =

Coordinates: 51.64742°N 3.03623°W

St Dials: Welsh: Sant Derfel
- Population: 3,796
- OS grid reference: ST284948
- Principal area: Torfaen
- Preserved county: Gwent
- Country: Wales
- Sovereign state: United Kingdom
- Post town: CWMBRAN
- Postcode district: NP44
- Dialling code: 01633
- Police: Gwent
- Fire: South Wales
- Ambulance: Welsh
- UK Parliament: Torfaen

St Dials (Welsh: Sant Derfel) is a suburb of Cwmbran in the county borough of Torfaen, in south-east Wales.

== History ==
Nothing is known about the Saint after which the suburb is named. There was another chapel dedicated to them near Monmouth and belonging to Monmouth Priory. The ruins of a building 10 feet by 8 feet with walls four feet thick and traces of an arch on the north side existed on the site of the police training college. It is thought this was associated with Llantarnam Priory.

== Education ==
The Police Training College (known as CENTREX) closed for the training of new recruits from April 2006. On August 6, 2008, Prisons Minister David Hanson announced a shortlist of four possible locations for a new Prison in Wales. The CENTREX site was a candidate, but there were strong protests. In February 2009 it was announced that the new prison would be located in Caernarfon, however as from September 2009, plans for this prison have also been abandoned.

== Demographics ==
At the 2001 Census

- Population 3796 (Torfaen 90,949)
- 47.1% Male, 52.9% Female
- Ages
  - 19.5% aged between 0-15
  - 37.0% aged between 16-44
  - 23.4% aged 45–59/64
  - 20.1% of pensionable age
