= Upper Cwmbran =

Upper Cwmbrân: Welsh: Cwmbrân Uchaf
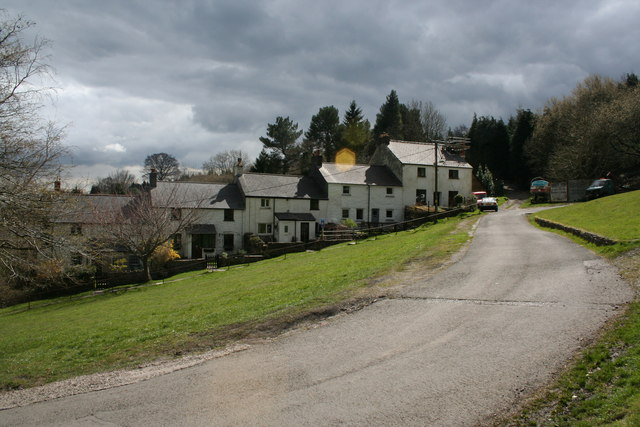
- The Square, Upper Cwmbran

- Location within Torfaen
- Area: 4.74 km^{2} (1.83 sq mi)
- Population: 5,228 (2011)
  - Density: 1,103/km^{2} (2,860/sq mi)
- OS grid reference: ST 275 965
- Community: Upper Cwmbran
- Principal area: Torfaen
- Preserved county: Gwent
- Country: Wales
- Sovereign state: United Kingdom
- Post town: CWMBRAN
- Postcode district: NP44
- Dialling code: 01633
- Police: Gwent
- Fire: South Wales
- Ambulance: Welsh
- UK Parliament: Torfaen
- Senedd Cymru – Welsh Parliament: Torfaen
- List of places UK Wales Torfaen 51.6642°N 3.0472°W Map of the community

Upper Cwmbran (officially Upper Cwmbrân; Welsh: Cwmbrân Uchaf) is a suburb of Cwmbran, Torfaen in Wales. It lies in between the suburbs of Pontnewydd and Thornhill. It is a community and electoral ward of Torfaen County Borough Council.

== History & Amenities ==
The area is mainly made up of 1950s and 1960s houses with occasional older Victorian properties. There are two pubs, The Queen Inn and The Bush Inn, along with a convenience store. The main thoroughfare is Thornhill Road, which eventually becomes Ty Pwca Road as it heads towards Pontnewydd.

Upper Cwmbran was home to the Cwmbran Brewery which closed in December 2009, and a Welsh longhouse called Gelligravog, built in 1610 above The Square. Gelligravog has more recently become a bed and breakfast known as Gelligravog Farmhouse B&B. The Square is a collection of miners' cottages from about 1820.

== Notable people ==
- Ernie Jenkins - a Welsh international dual-code rugby player. Born in Upper Cwmbran, 1880.
- Edwin Thomas Maynard, known as Edwin Thomas or "Beddoe" Thomas, a Welsh international rugby union prop. Born in Upper Cwmbran, 1878, and died in Upper Cwmbran, 1961.
