= Two Locks =

Suburb of Cwmbran, Wales

Coordinates: 51.642184°N 3.029186°W

Two Locks: Welsh: Dwy-loc
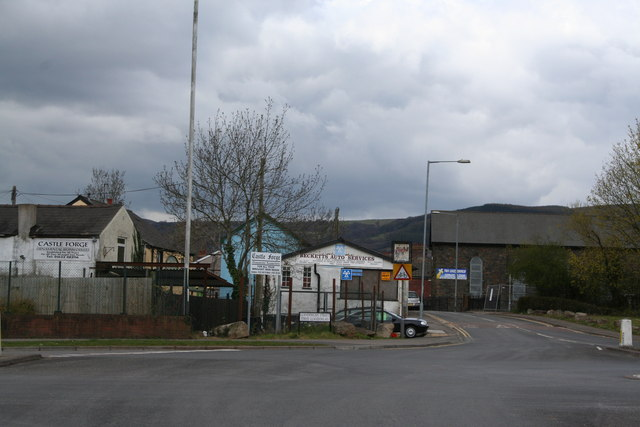

- Location within Torfaen
- Population: 6,212 (2011)
- OS grid reference: ST290941
- Principal area: Torfaen
- Preserved county: Gwent
- Country: Wales
- Sovereign state: United Kingdom
- Post town: CWMBRAN
- Postcode district: NP44
- Dialling code: 01633
- Police: Gwent
- Fire: South Wales
- Ambulance: Welsh
- UK Parliament: Torfaen

Two Locks (Welsh: Dwy-loc) is a suburb of Cwmbran in the county borough of Torfaen, in south-east Wales.

The locks in question are part of the Monmouthshire & Brecon Canal in its southern section between Newport and Pontypool.

== Demographics ==
At the United Kingdom Census 2001 demographics showed:

- Population 6,572 (Torfaen 90,949)
- 49.1% Male, 50.9% Female
- Ages
  - 23.3% aged between 0–15
  - 41.1% aged between 16–44
  - 21.7% aged 45–59/64
  - 13.9% of pensionable age
