= Llantarnam =

Village in southeast Wales

- The Greenhouse

- Location within Torfaen
- Area: 6.56 km^{2} (2.53 sq mi)
- Population: 4,125 (2011)
  - Density: 629/km^{2} (1,630/sq mi)
- OS grid reference: ST 305 935
- Community: Llantarnam
- Principal area: Torfaen
- Preserved county: Gwent
- Country: Wales
- Sovereign state: United Kingdom
- Post town: CWMBRAN
- Postcode district: NP44
- Dialling code: 01633
- Police: Gwent
- Fire: South Wales
- Ambulance: Welsh
- UK Parliament: Torfaen
- Senedd Cymru – Welsh Parliament: Torfaen
- List of places UK Wales Torfaen 51.63599°N 3.00563°W Map of the community

Llantarnam (Welsh: Llanfihangel Llantarnam; officially Llantarnam) is a village of Cwmbran, and is a community and electoral ward in the county borough of Torfaen in south east Wales. The ward covers the same area as the community, but also includes Southville.

Llantarnam Abbey is a Cistercian abbey founded in 1179 as a daughter house of Strata Florida Abbey. The remains of that abbey are incorporated into the present buildings housing the Sisters of Saint Joseph. It also contains St Michael's Church.

Llantarnam Hall is home to Rougemont School.

In 2015 Llantarnam School amalgamated with Fairwater High School to make the new school of Cwmbran High School.

In October 2026, its official name was announced as "Llantarnam" in both Welsh and English.

== Demographics ==
At the 2011 Census

- Population 4,125 (community), 5,526 (ward), (Torfaen 91,075)

== Governance ==
Llantarnam is part of the Llantarnam electoral ward which, since 2022, has elected three councillors to Torfaen County Borough Council. In May 2022 the ward elected three (former Labour Party) Independent councillors, though Nick Jones resigned in November 2022 causing a by-election. The by-election was won by (former Conservative), Jason O'Connell. However, in August 2024 all three Independent councillors joined Reform UK.

== Notable people ==
- David Lewis (martyr)
- Thomas Morgan (of Llantarnam)
- John Williams (VC)

== See also ==
- Llantarnam railway station, closed in 1962
