= Croesyceiliog =

- Croesyceiliog Comprehensive School (before demolition of the old building)

- Location within Torfaen
- Area: 2.18 km^{2} (0.84 sq mi)
- Population: 5,246 (2011)
  - Density: 2,406/km^{2} (6,230/sq mi)
- GSS code: W04000761
- OS grid reference: ST 305 965
- Community: Croesyceiliog
- Principal area: Torfaen
- Preserved county: Gwent
- Country: Wales
- Sovereign state: United Kingdom
- Post town: CWMBRAN
- Postcode district: NP44
- Dialling code: 01633
- Police: Gwent
- Fire: South Wales
- Ambulance: Welsh
- UK Parliament: Torfaen
- Senedd Cymru – Welsh Parliament: Monmouth
- List of places UK Wales Torfaen 51.66342°N 3.005512°W Map of the community

Croesyceiliog (Welsh pronunciation: [ˌkrɔɨs ə ˈkɛiljɔɡ]; 'Cockerel's cross') is a suburb and community of Cwmbran, Torfaen, Wales. It is also an electoral ward to Torfaen County Borough Council.

== Housing ==
Croesyceiliog is primarily a residential district and contains a wide variety of housing from Victorian terraces and even older Welsh cottages to property built between 1930 and 1970 and newer developments within the area. Most of the housing was built in the 1950s and 1960s as part of the development of Cwmbran New Town.

== Facilities ==
The former Gwent County Hall was located in Croesyceiliog. Until 2012 it provided the main administrative base for Monmouthshire County Council (even though it was outside that administrative area) and Gwent Police, and some offices for Torfaen County Borough Council. The demolition of the premises was required as a result of concrete cancer, and took place in 2013.

There are shops, takeaways, pubs, hairdressers and a doctors' surgery in the main shopping areas of Edlogan Square, the Highway and North Road.

There are two schools, Croesyceiliog Comprehensive School, and a primary school on North Road (Croesyceiliog Primary School).

There is a Baptist chapel on Chapel Lane, Pontrhydyrun Baptist Church and an Anglican church named St Mary's Church on Bryn Eglwys (literally 'Church Hill').

Croesyceiliog Cricket and Rugby Club is on the Highway. Croesyceiliog Cricket Club currently play in the Glamorgan and Monmouthshire League, while Croesyceiliog Rugby Club play in the Welsh Division Three East League. Croesyceiliog also has a lawn bowls team which play at Woodland Road Sports Grounds.

Woodland Road Park is a recreation area which contains a bowling green, rugby pitch, tennis courts, outdoor paddling pool and adventure playground.

The Croesyceiliog bypass was built in the 1960s and forms part of the main A4042 road between Newport and Abergavenny. Before the bypass was opened the A4042 went through Croesyceiliog.

== Census data ==
At the 2011 Census the following information was captured:

- Population 5,246 (Torfaen 91,075)
  - 47.7% male, 52.3% female
- Age structure
  - 15.6% aged 0–15
  - 31.8% aged 16–44
  - 20.0% aged 45–59
  - 32.6% aged 60+

== Governance ==
- For elections to the UK parliament, both wards are part of the constituency of Torfaen.
- For elections to the Senedd, both wards are part of the constituency of Monmouth.
- For elections to Torfaen County Borough Council, prior to May 2022 there were two wards - Croesyceiliog North returned 2 councillors and Croesyceiliog South returned 1 councillor. From May 2022 the two wards were combined to a single ward, coterminous with the community, electing two councillors.
- For elections to Croesyceiliog and Llanyrafon Community Council, the community is split into two wards. Croesyceiliog North returns 6 councillors, and Croesyceiliog South returns 2 councillors.

== People from Croesyceiliog ==
- Terry Cooper (footballer, born 1950)
- Dan Thomas (rugby union)
- Mary White (ceramicist and calligrapher) (1926–2013)
- Lenny Woodard (rugby)

== See also ==
- Communities of Torfaen
