= Greenmeadow =

Suburb of Cwmbran in Monmouthshire, Wales

Coordinates: 51.65092°N 3.04643°W

Greenmeadow: Welsh: Dôl-werdd
- Population: 4,439
- OS grid reference: ST277952
- Principal area: Torfaen
- Preserved county: Gwent
- Country: Wales
- Sovereign state: United Kingdom
- Post town: Cwmbran
- Postcode district: NP44
- Dialling code: 01633
- Police: Gwent
- Fire: South Wales
- Ambulance: Welsh
- UK Parliament: Torfaen

Greenmeadow (Welsh: Dôl-werdd) is a suburb of Cwmbran in the county borough of Torfaen, within the historic county boundaries of Monmouthshire, Wales.

Not to be confused with Green Meadow Golf Club, which is on the other side of Cwmbran in Croesyceiliog.

In October 2026, its official names were announced to be "Greenmeadow" in English and Dôl-werdd in Welsh.

== Demographics ==
At the 2001 Census:

- Population 4439 (Torfaen 90,949)
- 48.7% Male, 51.3% Female
- Ages
  - 29.1% aged between 0-15
  - 42.4% aged between 16-44
  - 20.4% aged 45–59/64
  - 8.1% of pensionable age

== Education ==
- Greenmeadow Primary School
