= Torfaen =

County borough in Wales

Torfaen County Borough Bwrdeistref Sirol Torfaen (Welsh)
- County borough
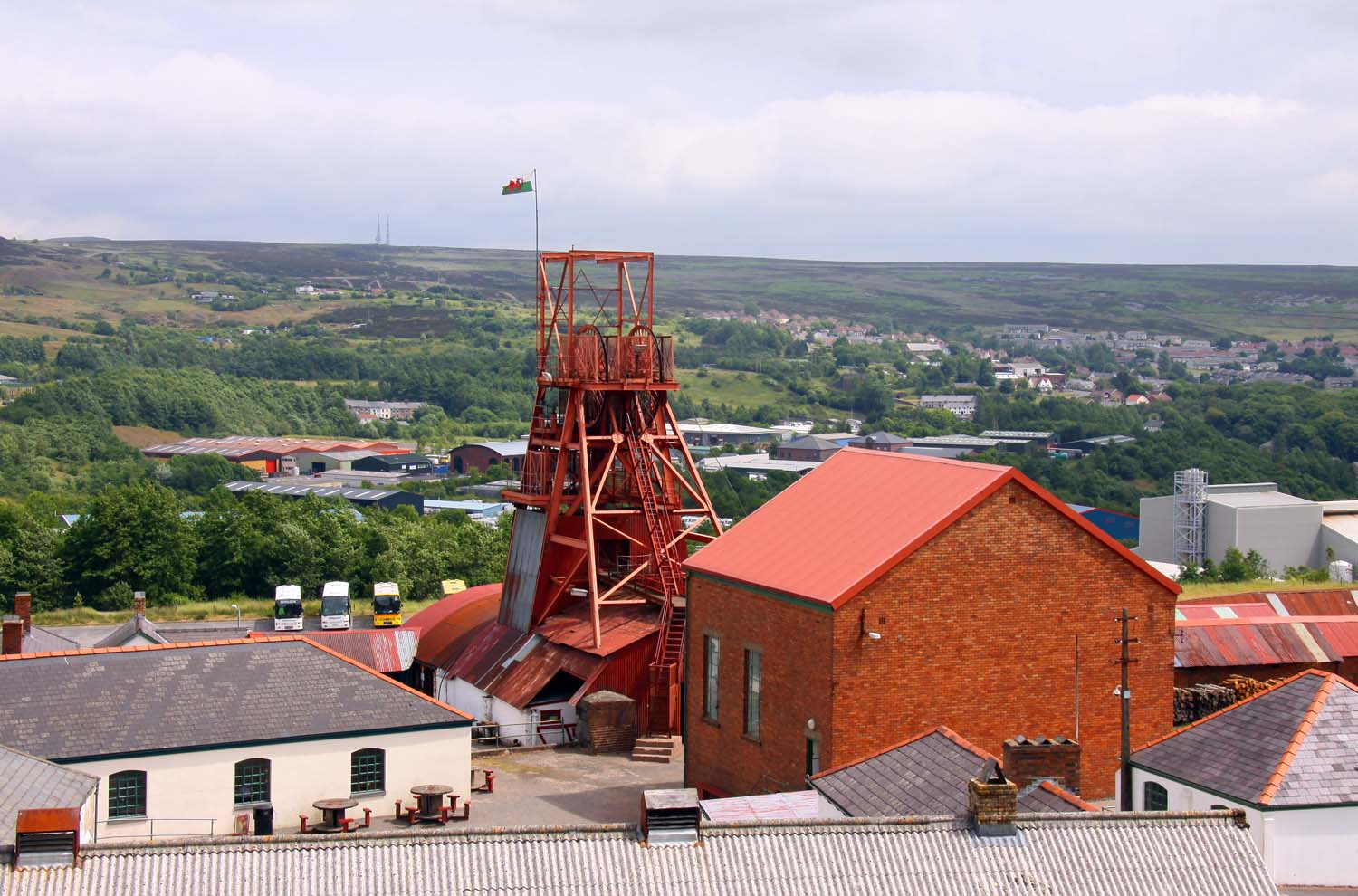
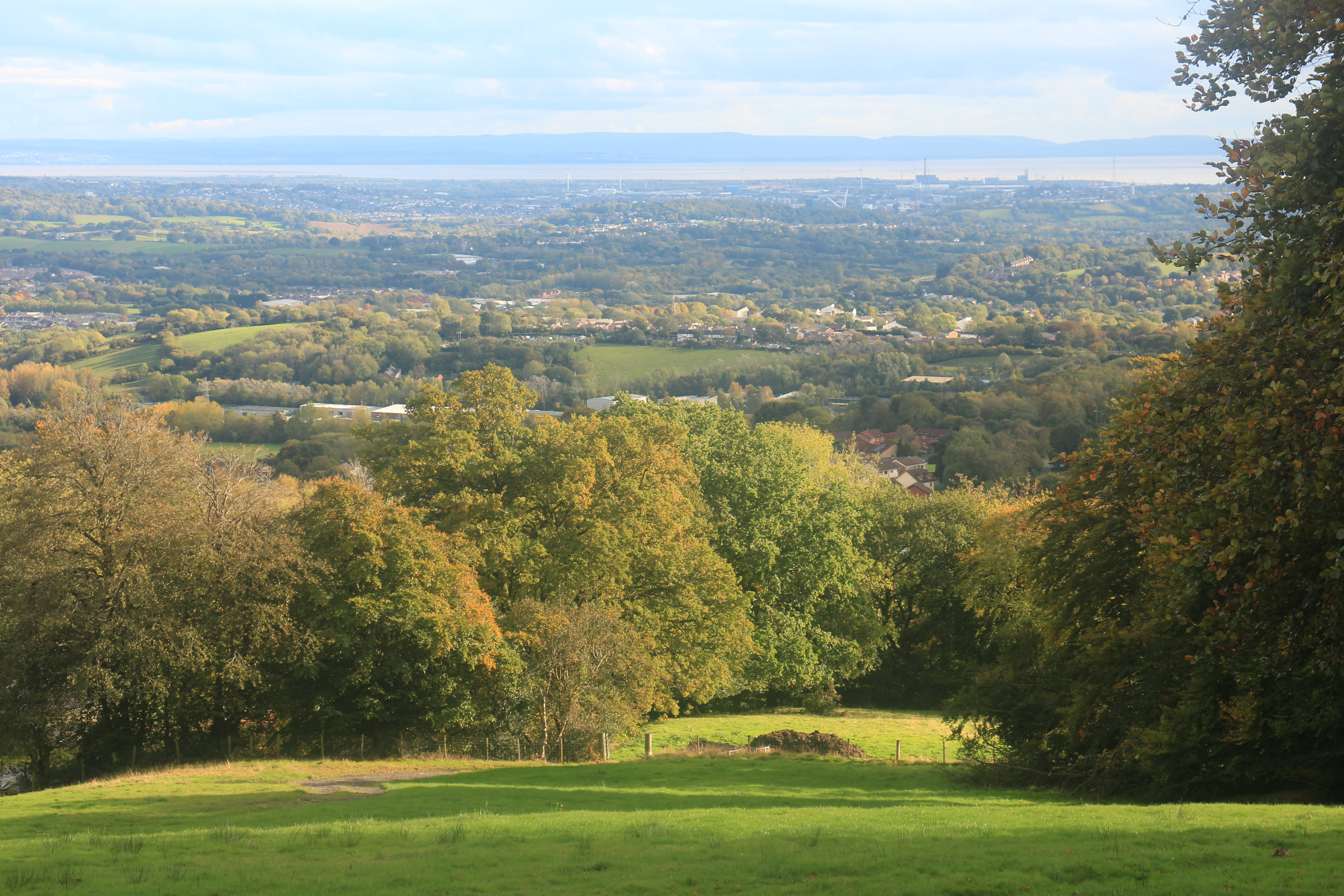
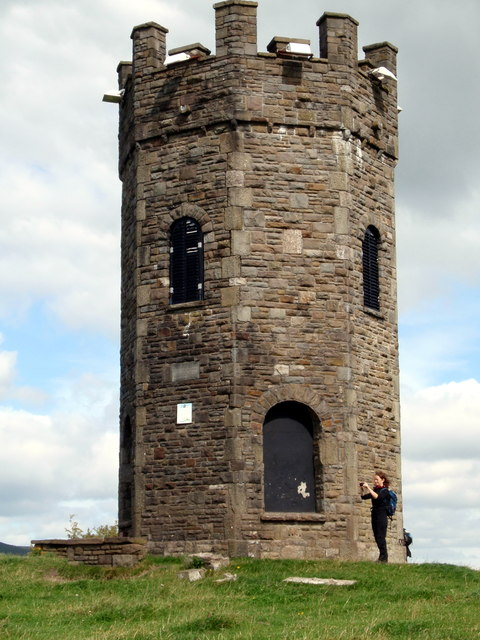
- Left to Right: Big Pit Museum at Blaenavon WHS; Overlooking west Cwmbran from Blaen-Bran; Folly Tower, Pontypool

- Coat of arms
- Motto: United We Serve
- Torfaen shown within Wales
- Coordinates: 51°43′N 3°03′W
- Sovereign state: United Kingdom
- Country: Wales
- Preserved county: Gwent
- Incorporated: 1 April 1974
- Unitary authority: 1 April 1996
- Administrative HQ: Pontypool

Government
  - Type: Principal council
  - Body: Torfaen County Borough Council
  - Control: Labour
  - MPs: Nick Thomas-Symonds (L)
  - MSs: 6 in Sir Fynwy Torfaen

Area
  - Total: 49 sq mi (126 km^{2})
  - Rank: 20th

Population (2025)
  - Total: 93,973
  - Rank: 18th
  - Density: 1,940/sq mi (748/km^{2})

Welsh language (2021)
  - Speakers: 8.2%
  - Rank: 19th
- Time zone: UTC+0 (GMT)
  - Summer (DST): UTC+1 (BST)
- ISO 3166 code: GB-TOF
- GSS code: W06000020
- Website: www.torfaen.gov.uk

Torfaen (/tɔːrˈvaɪn/; [tɔrˈvaɪn]) is a county borough in the south-east of Wales. Torfaen is bordered by the county of Monmouthshire to the east, the city of Newport to the south, and the county boroughs of Caerphilly and Blaenau Gwent to the south-west and north-west. It is within the boundaries of the historic county of Monmouthshire, and between 1974 and 1996 was a district of Gwent, until it was reconstituted as a principal area in 1996.

== Toponymy ==
Torfaen (meaning "breaker of stones") is an old name for the river – today called Afon Lwyd ("grey river") – which flows through the county borough from its source north of Blaenavon southward through Abersychan, Pontypool, and Cwmbran. The last three towns mentioned are a contiguous urban area.

== History ==
The borough was formed in 1974 as a local government district of Gwent. It covered the whole area of three former districts and two parishes from another two districts, which were all abolished at the same time:

- Blaenavon Urban District
- Cwmbran Urban District
- Henllys parish from Magor and St Mellons Rural District
- Llanfrechfa Lower parish from Pontypool Rural District
- Pontypool Urban District

All the constituent parts of Torfaen had previously been in the administrative county of Monmouthshire prior to the reforms. Gwent County Council provided county-level services to the new borough.

Torfaen was reconstituted in 1996 as a county borough, taking over the county-level functions from the abolished Gwent County Council. The area is now governed by Torfaen County Borough Council, which is a principal council.

Torfaen has its own museum Torfaen Museum, in Pontypool Park, Pontypool.

== Area characteristics ==
The area has a population of around 91,000. Much of the southern part of the county borough around Cwmbran is extensively urban. The north of the county borough is greener and retains extensive areas of countryside, especially on the route to Blaenavon.

The administrative centre is Pontypool in the centre of the county borough. Most of the administration of Torfaen County Borough Council is conducted from Pontypool Civic Centre.

== Local landmarks ==
The highest point of the county is Coity Mountain.

=== Pontypool Indoor Market ===
A market hall of 1893-4, built when the existing facility became too small and needed replacing due to the greatly increased local population. The previous Vegetable Market (1875) which stood on the same site was demolished, but the first hall built in 1730 still survives in Commercial Street. The Market was designed by Robert Williams and D J Loughor (who was probably the engineer). This building is the only physical reminder of the work of the Pontypool Local Board who were replaced by the Pontypool Urban District Council following the Local Government Act 1894.

Exterior

A large iron framed market hall with two full elevations and three secondary entrances through other street frontages, eg. Jubilee Building, Crane Street. Built of grey narrow coursed rock faced pennant limestone with some larger stones, and with yellow Ebbw Vale brick dressings and a Welsh slate roof. Single storey street elevations with windows onto secondary aisles which surround the main aisled hall. The Market Street elevation has a central doorway with four centred Tudor arch head. This has part glazed wooden doors with pilasters rising to a corbel frieze and a date panel 1893, and a parapet over with raised battlement type features at either end. This door is flanked on either side by four three-light windows with yellow brick frames and mullions. These are all in line, but the plinth below with yellow brick coping is stepped down the street. Additional doors flank these, again with pilasters but not rising to a parapet; then another three light window at the north end but only a single light one at the south corner. The end elevation has first a single light, then a two-light with king mullion, then five three-light windows, the most northerly one with a roundel in a gable above. The roofs behind these walls can be seen stepped up in three heights over the two aisles and the main nave. The nave roof has timber gable windows and glazing along the length of the roof on both slopes.

Crane Street entrance

This has another Tudor doorway as above, but flanked by one over one windows in plain heads. Above the entrance is a crow-stepped gable with block at apex and a three light window with stepped head above the door. Gable has date 1894 and inscription PLB (Pontypool Local Board).

The Commercial Street entrance has another Tudor style doorway set into the ground floor of an early C19 terrace on the south west side of Commercial Street. Only the doorway and the dateplaque 1894 above it are late C19.

Interior

The market has a central nave supported on plain iron columns, and this has aisles on either side and then a secondary aisle which surrounds most of the structure. There are additional passageways giving access to the entrances in Commercial Street and in Crane Street. The columns carry light curved iron members, and a roof structure of light iron with timber rafters and sarking. The nave roof has bands of glazing running the full length on either side of the ridge. The interior appears to be very little altered. The stalls are mostly modern.

=== Pontypool Park ===
- Pontypool Park is the name given to the former principal residence of Pontypool (now a secondary school) and the 160-acre (0.65 km^{2}) park that surrounds it. The park contains Pontypool Leisure Centre and sports facilities and is the home of Pontypool RFC. The park includes a folly, shell grotto and ornamental ponds. Much of the area is given to woodland but there is extensive open grassland. The American Gardens were opened to the public in 2008, after being closed to visitors for many years, and a restoration project is under way. Torfaen County Borough Council is currently mapping all the trees from the park to remove and then replant those dying and diseased.

=== Cwmbran Centre ===
- Cwmbran Centre is advertised as the second largest under-cover shopping centre in Wales. The centre includes many familiar high-street stores.

=== Blaenavon ===
- The former coal-mining and iron-working town of Blaenavon in the northern part of the county borough is now a recognised UNESCO World Heritage Site.

== Media ==
Torfaen has its own community radio station, Vitalize Radio, which is run on a voluntary basis in Pontypool to serve the community. Additionally, Cwmbran has its own community-focused radio station: Able Radio is a volunteer-run radio station which supports adults with autism and learning disabilities, and claims to be "the first Radio Station run by people with Learning Disabilities and Autism in the world". In recent years, Able Radio station has increased the scope of their activities, including television productions and their gardening project and associated produce shop, SustainAble. There is also the Cwmbran and District Amateur Radio Society, which focuses on ham radio.

There are also various local community news services, most notably Cwmbran Life and Inside Torfaen. The South Wales Argus serves as the main newspaper.

== Politics ==
Torfaen is historically a safe Labour Party seat and was created to replace Pontypool for the 1983 general election. Currently, the MP is Nick Thomas-Symonds. The Croesyceiliog North, Croesyceiliog South, Llanyrafon North and Llanyrafon South wards used to be part of the former Monmouth constituency until 2024. Torfaen was also a Senedd constituency, presided over by Labour MS, Lynne Neagle, until 2026. Since 2026, the county borough has been part of the Sir Fynwy Torfaen Senedd constituency, electing six members.

Torfaen Council has historically been a Labour-controlled authority, however the 2008 local elections saw Labour fail to win enough seats to hold a majority, resulting in a coalition with Plaid Cymru and Independent councillors.

In the 2022 local elections, Labour regained majority control of Torfaen County Borough Council, winning 30 out of a possible 40 seats.

The main council offices for Torfaen County Borough Council are situated in The Civic Centre, Pontypool.

Torfaen has six Community Councils, which are:

- Blaenavon Town Council.
- Croesyceiliog & Llanyrafon Community Council.
- Cwmbran Community Council.
- Henllys Community Council.
- Ponthir Community Council.
- Pontypool Community Council.

== Education ==
Secondary schools in the area are:

- Abersychan Comprehensive School, Pontypool
- Croesyceiliog School, Cwmbran
- Cwmbran High School, Cwmbran
- St Albans RC High School, Pontypool
- West Monmouth School, Pontypool
- Ysgol Gymraeg Gwynllyw, Pontypool. (Welsh Medium Education School)

Further education, vocational training and some higher education is provided at Torfaen Learning Zone of Coleg Gwent in Cwmbran centre. Before this, further education was provided at Pontypool campus, Coleg Gwent.

In 2012 Torfaen County Borough Council was criticised for keeping 2,400 laptop computers, originally intended to be used by secondary school pupils and teachers, unused for at least a year "because it couldn't figure out what to do" with the equipment, which originally cost over a million pounds.

== Railways ==
The borough is served by the Welsh Marches Line with stations at Pontypool & New Inn and Cwmbran. Services are operated by Transport for Wales. There is also the Pontypool and Blaenavon Railway in Blaenavon.

== Freedom of the Borough ==
The following people military units and Organisations and Groups have received the Freedom of the Borough of Torfaen.

=== Military Units ===
- Royal Welsh: 5 June 2010.
- The Royal British Legion: 28 June 2021.

=== Organisations and Groups ===
- Pontypool Rugby Football Club: 27 March 2024.

== See also ==
- List of Scheduled Monuments in Torfaen
- Grade I listed buildings in Torfaen
- Grade II* listed buildings in Torfaen
