= Dyne Steel Incline =

Steam-powered tramroad in Wales

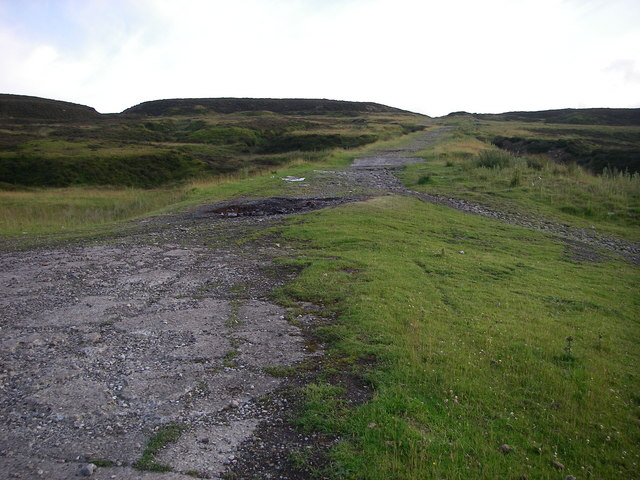
- Bed of the former Dyne-Steel tramway above Pwll-du. Now a bridleway

Overview
- Status: Defunct
- Coordinates: 51.789°N 3.110°W
- Termini: Blaenavon Ironworks; Pwll Du

Service
- Type: Tramroad

History
- Opened: 1850
- Dismantled: by 1880
- Closed: 1860

Technical
- Track gauge: Standard

The Dyne Steel Incline was a steam-powered tramroad that carried tram loads of cast iron up and over the hill between the Blaenavon Ironworks and Pwll Du. From there the trams continued along Hill's Tramroad to the Garnddyrys Forge and on to the Llanfoist wharf. It operated from around 1850 to 1860.

== Background ==
From 1817 the main route for exporting products of the Blaenavon Ironworks was northward through the Pwll Du Tunnel and then along Hill's Tramroad to Llanfoist, from where the goods were shipped by the Brecknock and Abergavenny Canal in the Usk Valley. Limestone for the Blaenavon furnaces came from the Tyla quarry and was shipped southward through the tunnel. The Garnddyrys Forge was built by Thomas Hill II in 1816–17. The tramroad brought cast iron from Blaenavon and took wrought iron from the forge to the Llanfoist wharf.

== History ==
Ends of the incline in Torfaen and Monmouthshire

The tunnel became inadequate to handle the volume of traffic. Around 1850 Thomas Dyne Steel (1822–98), engineer of the Blaenavon Company, designed a standard-gauge railway that ran from New Pit up the mountain and then down to Pwll Du. A stationary steam engine and winding drum at the summit pulled the trams up both sides. The incline soon proved a faster and more cost-effective route than the tunnel. In 1860 the Garnddyrys works were closed and the forge was relocated to Forgeside, Blaenavon. The incline was dismantled by 1880.

== Today ==
The route of the incline is still easily seen, including shallow cuttings and embankments. The engine house no longer stands, but its platform is visible. It is thought that the bases of the engine and the drum below ground are well preserved. There are also traces of the engine driver's house and garden, and a well used to obtain water for the engine's boilers.

== Sources ==
- Brockway, Derek; Carey, Julian (23 November 2006), Weatherman Walking, Y Lolfa, ISBN 978-0-86243-917-0
- "Dyne Steel's Incline, Blaenavon", Coflein, Royal Commission on the Ancient and Historical Monuments of Wales
- "Garnddyrys Forge, Blorenge", Coflein, Royal Commission on Ancient and Historical Monuments of Wales
- "Dyne Steel Incline Plane", Historic Environment Record (HER), Glamorgan-Gwent Archaeological Trust (GGAT), GGAT PRN: 05493.0g – archwilio (online database of the four Welsh Archaeological Trusts)
- Gardener, Clive (2001), "The Tunnel History & Operation", Ghosts of Pwll Du
