= Pwll Du Tunnel =

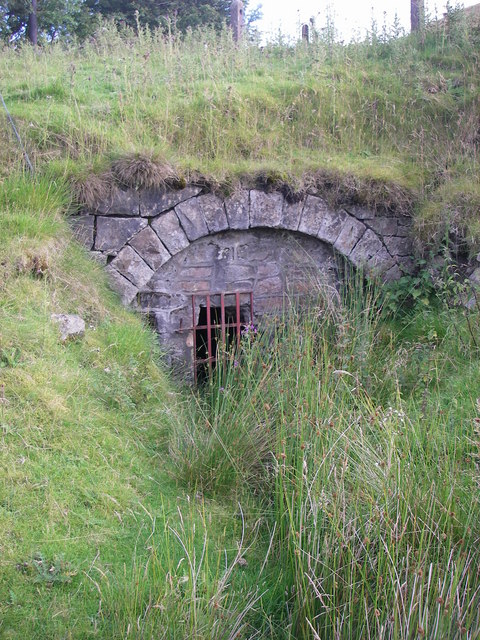
- Northern entrance of the Pwll Du tunnel under the Blaen Pig area
- Interactive map of Pwll Du Tunnel

Overview
- Location: Blaenavon, Torfaen, Wales
- Coordinates: N 51.7987°N 3.0958°W; S 51.7814°N 3.0905°W
- Status: Protected (NPRN 85830)

Operation
- Opened: 1816
- Closed: 1926
- Character: Tramroad

Technical
- Length: 1,875 metres (6,152 ft)

The Pwll Du Tunnel was the longest horse-powered tramway tunnel to be built in Britain at 1,875 metres (6,152 ft) in length. It started in Blaenavon, Torfaen, Wales, and was originally a coal mine, running northward almost horizontally into a hillside. Later it was extended right through the hill and used to carry limestone from quarries at Pwll Du and Tyla to the ironworks at Blaenavon, and to carry pig iron from Blaenavon to the Garnddyrys Forge. The tramway was extended past Garnddyrys to Llanfoist Wharf on the Brecknock and Abergavenny Canal. The tramway from Pwll Du to the canal fell out of use when the railway came to Blaenavon and the Garnddyrys forge was closed in 1860, but the tunnel continued to be used to carry limestone to Blaenavon until 1926. It is now a scheduled monument and part of a UNESCO World Heritage Site.

== Origins ==
The Blaenavon Ironworks, completed in 1789, was the most advanced in Wales in its day, using coke rather than charcoal for smelting with a steam engine to blow the furnace. The coal and iron ore were extracted from mines at various levels in the north east side of the Afon Lwyd valley. What would become the Pwll Du Tunnel was one of these mines, extending for about 0.75 miles (1.21 km) into the hillside on a gentle slope. The tunnel was started around 1782 to extract iron ore. The historian William Coxe gave it a length of about 0.75 miles (1.21 km) in 1801. The Pwll Du limestone quarry, Blaenavon, lay on the north eastern lip of the South Wales Coalfield, on the upland bluff that overlooks Abergavenny. From 1789 limestone was carried south to Blaenanon over the mountain by a cart-road from Pwll Du. A horse-drawn railway was inaugurated in 1796 to take limestone from the Blorenge Mountain quarries to the ironworks.

When plans were made to build the Garnddyrys (Note: Alexander Cordell made the Garnddyrys forge famous in his Rape of the Fair Country (1959).) iron forge in Cwm Llanwenarth on the west branch of the Blorenge hill, they included replacing a steeply sloped tramroad from Blaenavon by a shallow gradient tramroad along an extension of the earlier tunnel through the hill to Pwll Du. In response to a surge in demand for iron during the Napoleonic Wars, Thomas Hill, who managed the Blaenavon ironworks, began to build what became called Hill's Tramroad from Pwll Du to the Llanfoist wharf around 1815. The tramroad ran past Garnddyrus forge, down the northern side of the Blorenge hill to Llanfoist Wharf on the Brecknock and Abergavenny Canal. Pig iron and iron products were then transported down the canal to the Newport Docks.

Thomas Hill extended the early tunnel through the hill to form a tramroad tunnel from Blaenavon to Pwll Du to carry limestone and coal. The tunnel, high enough for horse-drawn trams, runs through the Mynydd Garn Fawr in a sweeping curve. The horse-drawn railway through the tunnel was in operation by 1817. Limestone was taken from the quarry up to the railway by a water-balance lift, using water from a reservoir above.

== Tramroad and tunnel ==
Hill's tramroad was a plateway with 2 feet (0.61 m) gauge on stone sleeper blocks. It had connections to limestone quarries at Pwll-Du and Tyla. It was extended around 1817–22 to run from Pwll Du to Llanfoist via Garnddyrys. The tramroad ran for 3 miles (4.8 km) north east from the north portal round the Blorenge shoulder to Llanfoist Wharf.

The tunnel rose by 70 feet (21 m) from Blaenavon to Pwll Du. The tunnel is 2,050 yards (1,870 m) long. (Note: Different sources give the tunnel's length as 1,875 metres (6,152 ft), just over 2,000 metres (6,600 ft) and 2,400 metres (7,900 ft).) The tunnel was the longest that was ever built in Britain for a horse-powered surface railway. The tunnel was accessed through a portal at the south end by Blaenavon. This impressive portal was named "The Marble Arch". The Pwll Du end of the tunnel was a stone lined trench, later covered, with two linked portals in a Y branch. There was a junction just inside the tunnel. The tramroad to the Tyla quarries entered the western portal. The tramroad to the Garnddyrys Forge and onward to the canal entered the eastern portal, probably built in 1816.

== Operations ==
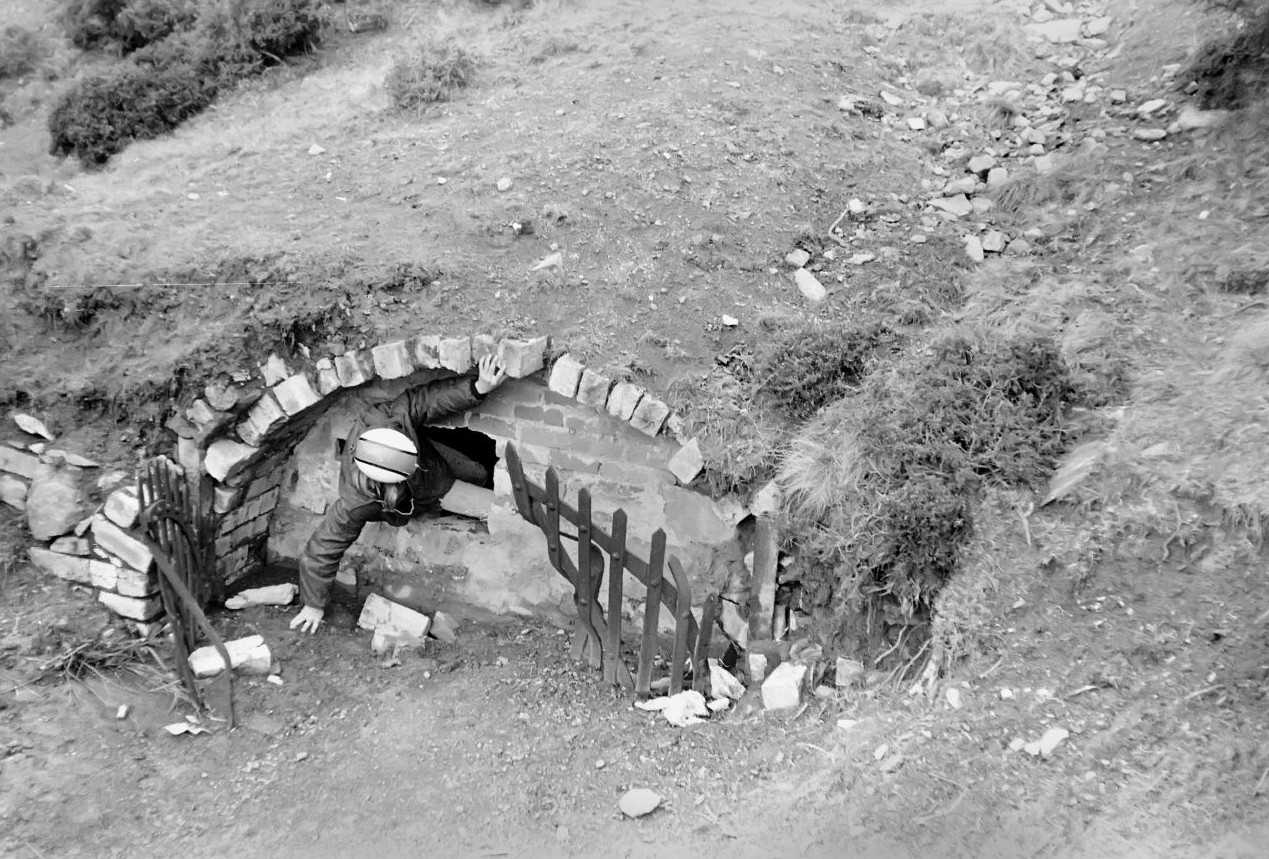
Southern portal at Blaenavon in 1974

Pig iron was carried from the ironworks to the Garnddyrys forge, established in 1817, for conversion to wrought iron. The section running to Llanfoist wharf became obsolete when mainline railways reach the Blaenavon ironworks in the 1850s. The tunnel bore heavy traffic for forty years while Garnddyrus Forge was operating. The minerals on both sides of the tunnel continued to be mined, with secondary workings in 1814, 1864, 1867–68, 1894, 1898 and 1902.

The Dyne Steel Incline railway over the mountain was built about 1850. The double incline ran up and over the hill above the tunnel, with a steam engine at the summit to haul up the loaded trains. (Note: The lengthy double-inclined tramroad is a distinctive feature of the landscape, visible from a distance. The northern part has been partly cut away by open cast mining in the mid-20th century, and has suffered erosion.) In 1860 the Garnddyrys works were closed, the forge was relocated to Forgeside, Blaenavon, and the northern branch of the tunnel at Pwll Du was closed.

The tunnel continued to be used to carry limestone to Blaenavon. Limestone was being carried from the Pwll Du and Tyla quarries through the tunnel to Blaenavon as late as 1926. In later years the trams were hauled by stationary engines at each end of the tunnel. A train might consist of 15–20 trams, each holding about two tons of limestone. Women of Pwll Du would ride through the hill sitting on the trams in bad weather, rather than walk over the hill.

== Later years ==
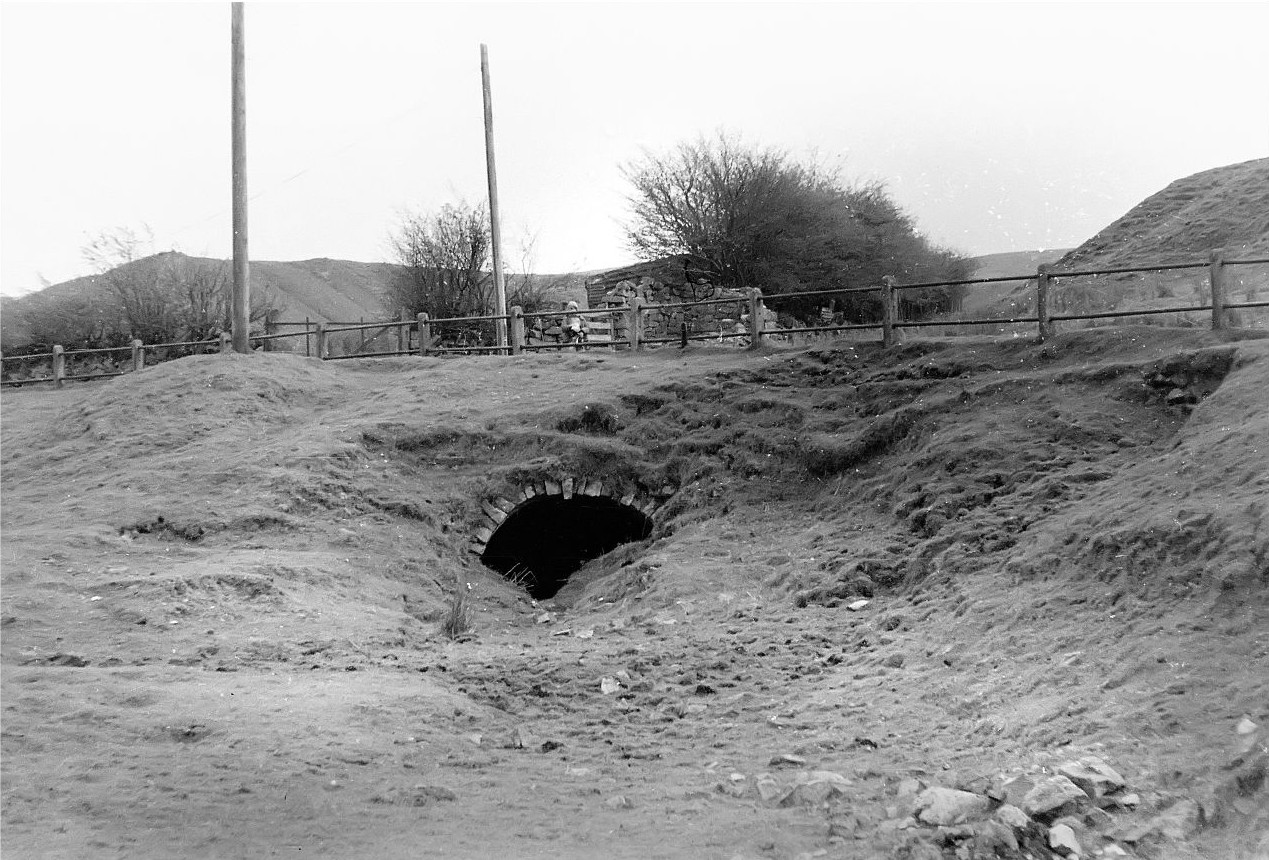
Northern portal at Pwll Du in 1974

The limestone quarries closed after the General Strike of 1926, and the tunnel was no longer used. In 1933 a measurement survey was undertaken to explore for coal. In 1933–34 a team of fifteen to twenty men from the Blaenavon Company drove a heading that found a workable 2 to 3 feet (0.61 to 0.91 m) coal seam. Eventually exploration was halted due to faults, water and risks from uncharted older disused mines. A brick wall closed off the Pwll Du end. There was a major collapse about 50 yards (46 m) into the Tyla branch that may have been caused by water leaking from the Pwll Du reservoir. There was a bedding collapse about 40 metres (130 ft) into the Garnddyrys branch, perhaps from the same cause, but possibly due to open cast workings above the tunnel in the 1940s.

In 1999 a team of cavers and industrial archaeologists announced plans to investigate the tunnel. The exploration team sank a shaft into the water-filled tunnel beyond the roof fall at the Pwll Du end. After pumping the water (if not contaminated) they planned to explore the full length. The tunnel at the Blaenavon entrance is now lined with brick and supported by large timbers installed in the 20th century. In November 2000 UNESCO designated the Blaenavon Industrial Landscape as a World Heritage Site, including the town, ironworks, Big Pit Museum and Hill's tramroad with its Pwll Du tram tunnel. Part of the ironworks is now a museum.

== Sources ==
- Browne, David M.; Hughes, Stephen (2003), The Archaeology of the Welsh Uplands, Royal Commission on the Ancient and Historical Monuments of Wales, ISBN 978-1-871184-26-6
- "Dyne Steels's Incline", Coflein, Royal Commission on the Ancient and Historical Monuments of Wales
- Gardener, Clive (2001), "The Tunnel History & Operation", Ghosts of Pwll Du
- "Hill's Tramroad: Pwll Du Tunnel", Coflein, Royal Commission on the Ancient and Historical Monuments of Wales
- HLCA 011 Blorenge and Gilwern HillHistoric Landscape Characterisation, Glamorgan-Gwent Archaeological Trust
- Hughes, Stephen (1990), The Archaeology of an Early Railway System: The Brecon Forest Tramroads, Royal Commission on Ancient and Historical Monuments in Wales, ISBN 978-1-871184-05-1
- Newman, John (1 March 2000), Gwent/Monmouthshire, Yale University Press, ISBN 978-0-300-09630-9
- Seabourne, Dave (22 July 1999), "Work starts to open up old tramroad" (PDF), Abergavenny Chronicle – via Welsh Mines Society Newsletter November 1999
- "Thomas Hill's Tram Road" (PDF), Visit Blaenavon
- Wilcock, John (2 October 2007), COST A27 cultural parks and cultural landscapes: Blaenavon, COST A27 Understanding pre-industrial structures in rural and mining landscapes
