= Blaenavon Industrial Landscape =

UNESCO World Heritage Site
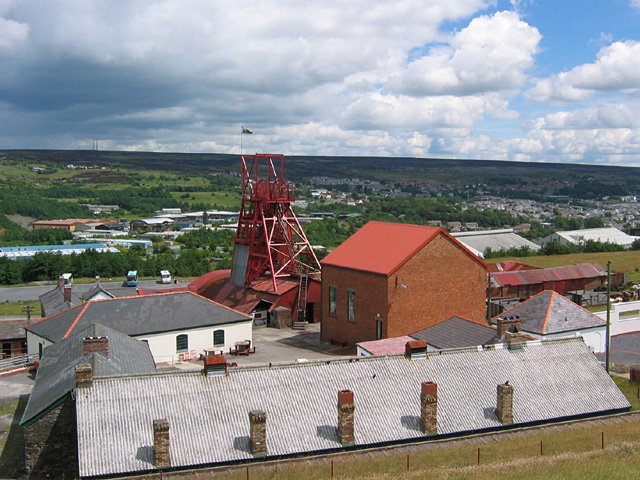
- Big Pit National Coal Museum
- Interactive map of Blaenavon Industrial Landscape
- Location: Blaenavon, Torfaen, Wales, United Kingdom
- Criteria: Cultural: (iii), (iv)
- Reference: 984
- Inscription: 2000 (24th Session)
- Area: 3,290 ha (8,100 acres)

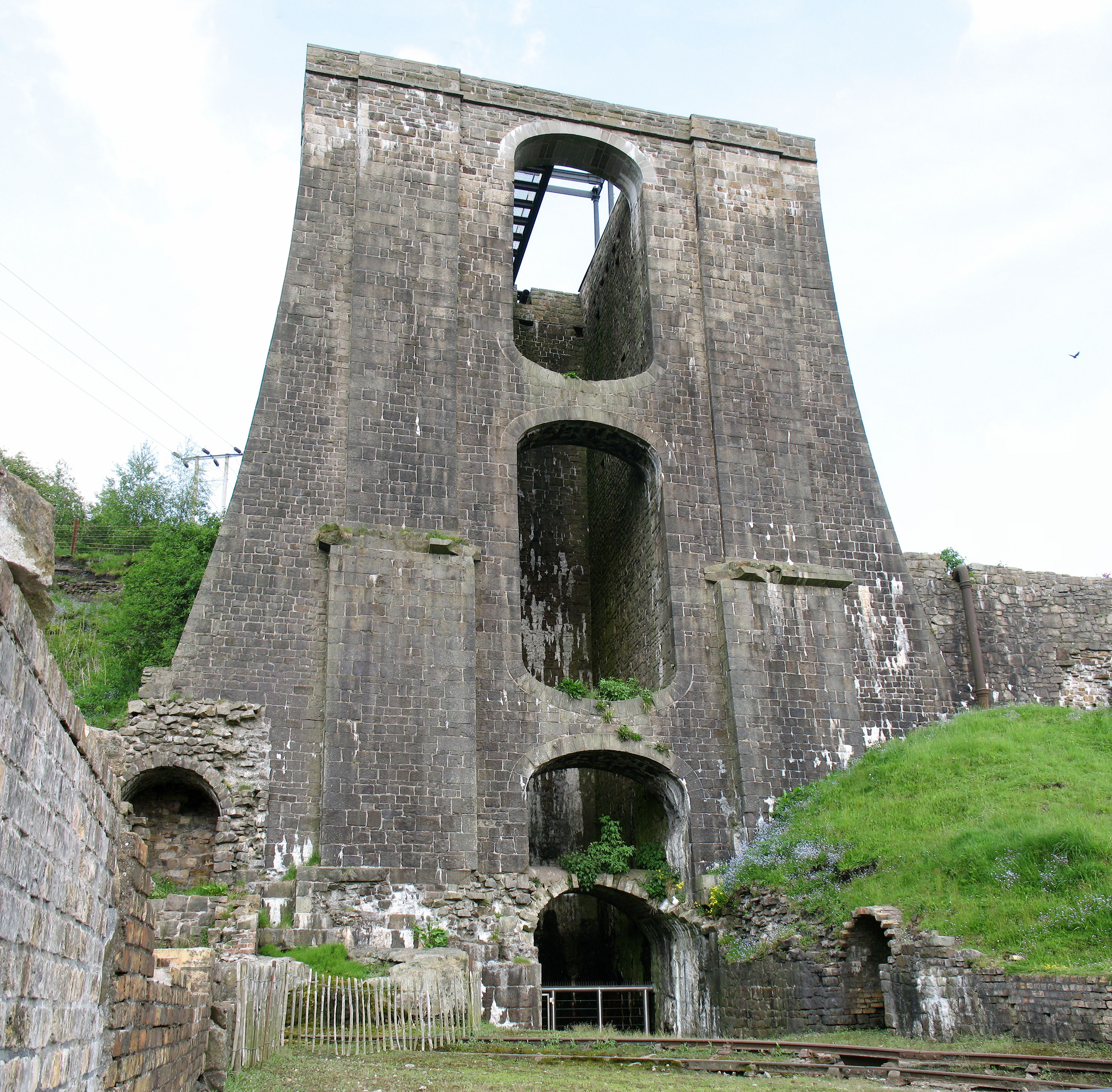
Blaenavon water balance tower

Blaenavon Industrial Landscape, in and around Blaenavon, Torfaen, Wales, was inscribed a World Heritage Site by UNESCO in 2000. The Blaenavon Ironworks, now a museum, was a major centre of iron production using locally mined or quarried iron ore, coal and limestone. Raw materials and products were transported via horse-drawn tramroads, canals and steam railways. The Landscape includes protected or listed monuments of the industrial processes, transport infrastructure, workers' housing and other aspects of early industrialisation in South Wales.

== Location ==
The Industrial Revolution in Britain was based on iron and coal, the main products of the South Wales valleys. Production of pig iron in the region grew from 39,600 tons in 1796 to 666,000 tons in 1852, and the iron was used to build railways, factories and engines around the world. Blaenavon was an important centre of coal mining and iron making in South Wales during the late 18th and early 19th centuries. The Blaenavon Ironworks was opened around 1789 and caused development of the mines, quarries and housing.

Blaenavon lies at the upper end of the Afon Lwyd valley in South Wales. The World Heritage Site is based on the large area of land that the Blaenavon Company leased in 1789. The site is on the north eastern rim of the South Wales Coalfield. The area is an excellent example of an industrial landscape formed in the late 18th and early 19th centuries by mining and iron making activities. The 3,290 hectares (8,100 acres) site contains the Blaenavon Ironworks and the Big Pit coal mine, surrounded by mines and quarries, manufacturing plant, railways, canal, workers' housing and social infrastructure.

== Elements of the landscape ==
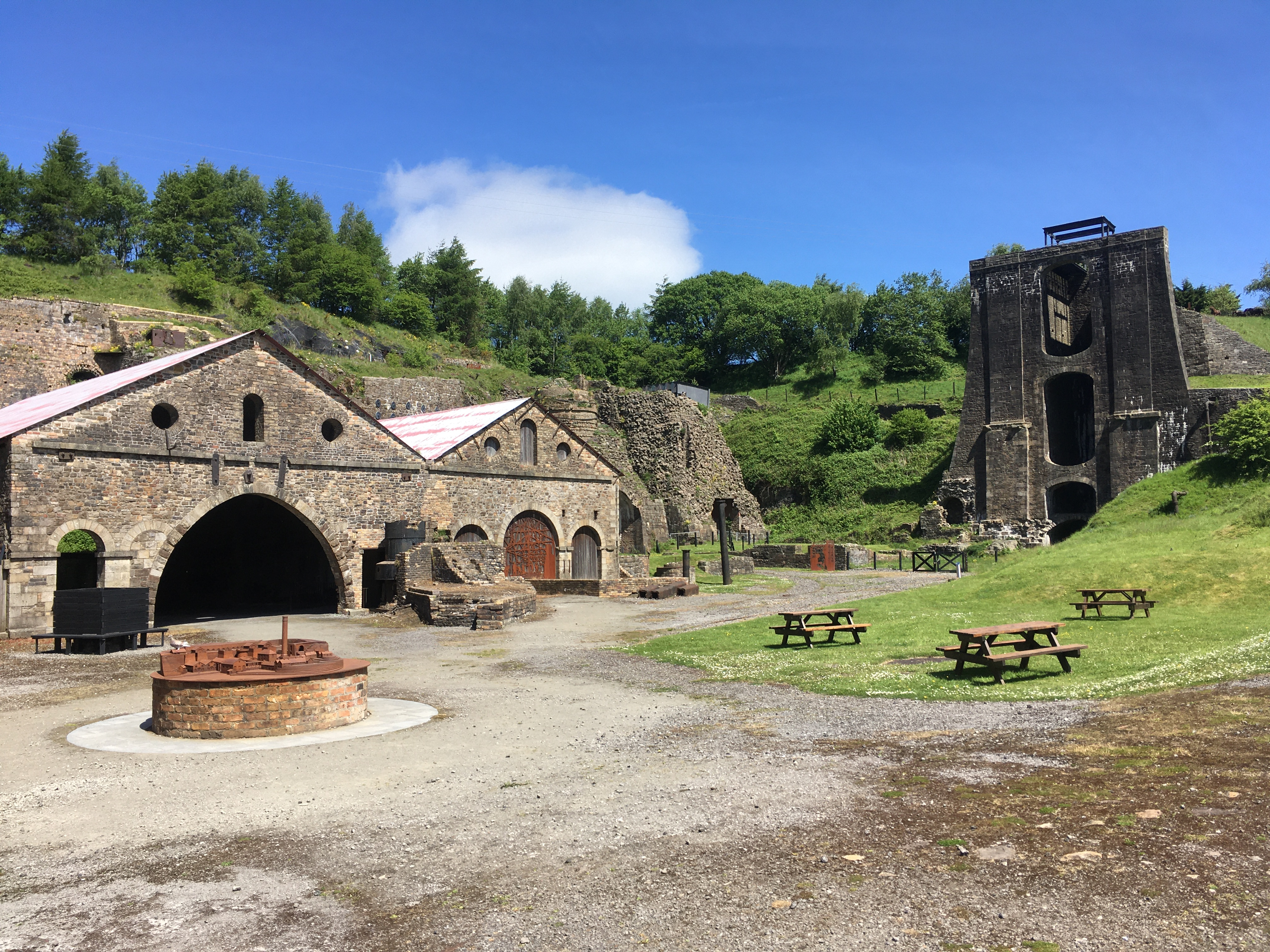
Blaenavon Ironworks Buildings and Water Balance Tower

The Blaenavon Ironworks operated from 1789 to 1902. Today there are remains of six blast furnaces, cast houses, boiler rooms, engine houses, the water balance tower used to raise and lower trams, and workers' housing around Stack Square. The remains of the furnaces from the late 18th century and the 19th century are well preserved. Other elements include the 1839 water balance tower, two casting houses, ruined kilns, the base of the massive chimney of the blowing engine, the cast-iron structure that carried the blast pipes to the furnaces, and ruins of workers' housing.

The Big Pit was the last deep coal mine to remain operational in the area. The surface buildings, winding gear and underground workings are still in excellent condition. The Big Pit coal mine, now managed by Amgueddfa Cymru – Museum Wales, was worked from around 1860 until 1980. The original pithead buildings have been preserved, including the head frame, winding engine and baths. The Big Pit Colliery was reopened as a museum in 1983. Visitors may take an underground tour. In 2005 it won the Gulbenkian Prize for museum of the year.

Extant buildings from the early industrial period include Ty-Mawr (Big House) also known as Blaenavon House, built for Iron Master, Samuel Hopkins, in 1791, worker's housing terraces, St. Peter's Church (1804), St. Peter's School (1816) and the Blaenavon Workmen's Hall (1894). Other elements of the Industrial Landscape are the mines and quarries from which coal, iron ore, fire clay and limestone were extracted. There are traces of horse-drawn railways, tunnels and inclines that were used to carry iron ore, coal and limestone to the ironworks, and to carry pig iron to the Garnddyrys Forge. Wrought iron was taken from the forge to Llanfoist on the Brecknock and Abergavenny Canal for transport to other parts of Britain and the world. There are walks and trails along which visitors may explore the Landscape. Waymarked footpaths follow the tracks of the earliest iron railways. The Pontypool and Blaenavon Railway was once an important transport facility. The steam railway has been restored and has a station in the centre of the town.

== Importance ==
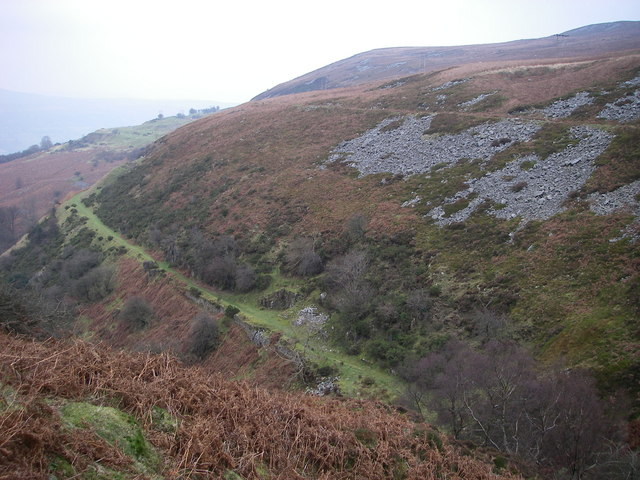
Hill's Tramroad leading from the Pwll Du Tunnel to the Garnddyrys Forge. Line above is the leat that carried water from the balancing pond east of Pwll Du to the forge site at Garnddyrys

A 33 square kilometres (13 sq mi) area of the Blaenavon Industrial Landscape was inscribed as a World Heritage Site in December 2000. Blaenavon was the first "cultural landscape" to be recognised in the United Kingdom. About £40 million was spent in the first ten years. The Landscape meets two criteria for a World Heritage Site.

- Criterion (iii): An exceptional illustration in material form of the social and economic structure of 19th century industry.
- Criterion (iv): An outstanding and remarkably complete example of a 19th-century industrial landscape.

In 2013, retrospective statements of Outstanding Universal Value were added to the listing:

- Evidence of tangible and intangible heritage of the development of early industrial society.
- Outstanding relict landscape of the combined efforts of nature and man.
- Evidence of the area’s international importance in iron making and coal mining in the late 18th and early 19th century.
- Development of transport systems in the late 18th and 19th centuries.

The boundary of the property, defined by historical land ownership, landscape features and exclusion of areas that lack historical authenticity, includes the main monuments of the mining and iron working settlement, in remarkably good condition, and the remains of mine, quarry and transport infrastructure. It is possible to trace the complex industrial process and its social aspects in the early Industrial Revolution.

== Preservation ==
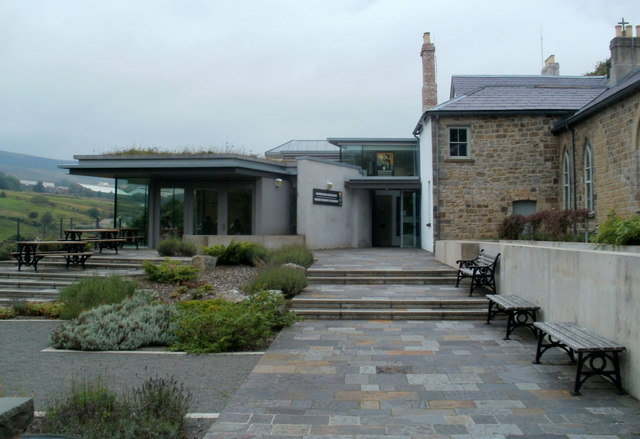
Blaenavon World Heritage Centre

The Landscape includes 24 scheduled monuments and 82 listed buildings, of which the most important are publicly owned. At the time of inscription as a World Heritage Site many of the elements were vulnerable due to lack of conservation. Since then there has been extensive work on conserving the ironworks, Big Pit and other historic elements of Blaenavon and the surrounding landscape. There are continued efforts to ensure that new development does not reduce the value and appearance of the Landscape.

The Torfaen County Borough Council, Brecon Beacons National Park Authority and Monmouthshire County Council have statutory planning responsibility for parts of the Landscape. The development plans of these authorities aim to protect the property, which is also covered by provisions of the Town and Country Planning Act (1980) and the Planning (Listed Buildings and Conservation Areas Act, 1990). The Blaenavon Town Centre and Cwmavon are conservation areas, and there is a proposal to make Forgeside and Glantorfaen another conservation area. A World Heritage Centre was opened for visitors in 2008. The Landscape is managed by the Blaenavon Partnership, which involves various authorities, agencies and other bodies and is led by Torfaen County Borough Council. A World Heritage Day is held in June each year. A cost-benefit analysis of the world heritage status has shown that it had succeeded in regenerating the area.

Architects Purcell Miller Tritton won the Gold Medal for Architecture at the National Eisteddfod of Wales of 2008 for their work on the World Heritage Centre for visitors.

== Sources ==
- Blaenavon Industrial Landscape, Cadw, archived from the original on 24 April 2016
- Blaenavon Industrial Landscape, UK Local Authority World Heritage Forum, 2013, archived from the original on 24 April 2016
- Blaenavon Industrial Landscape, UNESCO Text was copied from this source, which is available under a Creative Commons Attribution 3.0 IGO (CC BY 3.0 IGO) license.
- Barber, Chris (2007). In the Footsteps of Alexander Cordell. Blorenge Books. ISBN 978-1872730127.
- Galla, Amareswar (22 November 2012), World Heritage: Benefits Beyond Borders, Cambridge University Press, ISBN 978-1-139-85215-9
- Rodger, John (May 2009), "Managing Blaenavon's industrial landscape", Context (109), IHBC, archived from the original on 26 April 2016
- Sartain, Vicky (2016), Blaenavon Industrial Landscape, Discover Britain
