= Ogof Draenen =

Welsh cave system

- Interactive map of Ogof Draenen
- Location: Pwll Du, north of Blaenavon, Monmouthshire, Wales
- Coordinates: 51.8003°N 3.0933°W
- Length: 66 kilometres (41.0 mi)
- Discovery: 1994
- Access: Pwll Du Cave Management Group
- Translation: Hawthorn Cave (Welsh)
- Cave survey: OUCC survey information Chelsea Spelaeological Society (1996-9)

Ogof Draenen (Welsh for "Hawthorn Cave") entrance is located at Pwll Du, north of Blaenavon, Monmouthshire. At 66 kilometres (41 mi) (Note: 66 kilometres (41 mi) is the official figure; the true length of passage is still being revised upward, with a more recent estimate of approximately 70 kilometres (43 mi)) it is the longest cave system in Wales and the second longest in Great Britain behind the Three Counties System on the Cumbria/Lancashire/Yorkshire border. (Note: The second longest cave in Wales is Ogof Ffynnon Ddu at 59 kilometres (37 mi))

The cave was known only as a small entrance on a steep hillside, until several years of digging broke through into major passage development in October 1994. It was then explored at unprecedented speed to become the longest known cave in Wales. Water has been traced from locations within Ogof Draenen to a resurgence beside the Afon Lwyd at Pontnewynydd several kilometres to the south, where it is used as a supply by Welsh Water.

Ogof Draenen contains a variety of spectacular decorations and some huge passages: the War of the Worlds section is probably the second largest cave passage in Britain. Its large size and occasional complexity make the cave a challenge for even experienced cavers.

The cave is managed by the Pwll Du Cave Management Group.

== See also ==
- Daren Cilau
- Craig a ffynnon
