= Pwll Du =

Coordinates: 51°47′49.3″N 3°5′40.82″W

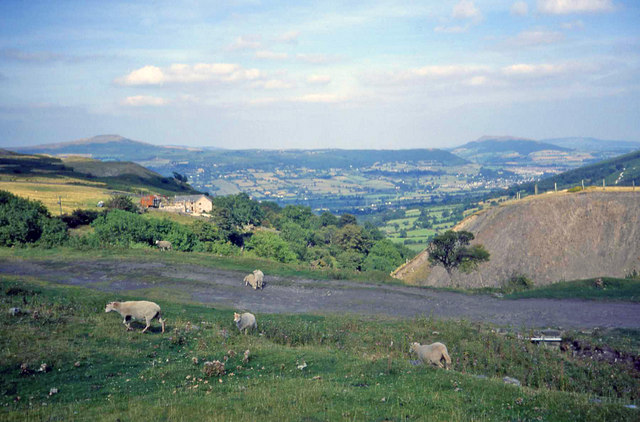
- Old mine workings at Pwll-du

- Location within Monmouthshire
- Population: 0
- OS grid reference: SO295145
- Principal area: Monmouthshire
- Preserved county: Gwent
- Country: Wales
- Sovereign state: United Kingdom
- Police: Gwent
- Fire: South Wales
- Ambulance: Welsh

Pwll Du (meaning black pit) was a village in Monmouthshire, Wales. It was mark for demolition in 1960 and demolished in 1964. The main employment was provided by nearby Coal, Iron Ore levels and the limestone quarries for the iron works in Blaenavon. The Pwll Du Tunnel from Blaenavon, once the longest horse-powered tramway in Britain, ended near the village. A pub and the former Welfare Hall, now a school's outdoor pursuits centre, are all that are left standing.

== History ==
Pwll Du was established in the early 1800’s. There were four rows of terrace houses, one at the main coal level at Old Pwll Du with 8 houses, Short Row with 16 houses and then Long Row with 30, plus Lower Long Row with three cottages and a shop At one time Pwll Du had two pubs, a chapel, and two schools over its time . The Prince of Wales pub spanned the border between Monmouthshire and Brecknockshire. The two counties had different alcohol licensing laws, and it is said that patrons of the pub would move from one county to the other so they could continue to drink legally.

The 300 residents were miners, quarrymen, ironworkers and their families. Employment declined from the 1930s and people began to move out. . The mines had closed. The houses were dilapidated and had neither running water nor sewerage. The houses were demolished in 1964 after the remaining residents had been moved, most of them to Govilon, a village further down the hill. The Welfare Hall was built in the 1940s, funded by a levy on the villagers. It was not torn down and is now a privately owned outdoor pursuits centre. The Lamb and Fox pub also survived and is now a private residence.

Alexander Cordell wrote several novels about families living and working in this area. One of the most important caves in Britain, the Ogof Draenen, lies under the area.

== Tramroads and quarry ==
The Pwll Du Tunnel, the longest horse-drawn tram tunnel in Britain, used to terminate near the village. It connected the Blaenavon Ironworks to limestone quarries at Pwll-Du and Tyla. The horse-drawn railway through the tunnel was in operation by 1817. Limestone was taken from the quarry up to the railway by a water-balance lift, using water from a reservoir above.

Hill's Tramroad ran for 3 miles (4.8 km) north east from Pwll Du round the Blorenge hill to Llanfoist Incline, where the drams were sent down to the canal and railway. The tramroad carried cast iron brought through the tunnel from the Blaenavon Ironworks to the Garnddyrys Forge, and wrought iron from the Forge to Llanfoist. After about 1850 cast iron from Blaenavon was carried over the Dyne Steel Incline and then down Hill's Tramroad. In 1860 the Garnddyrys works were closed, the forge was relocated to Forgeside, Blaenavon, and the northern branch of the tunnel at Pwll Du was closed. The limestone quarries closed after the General Strike of 1926.

== Sources ==
- Background: Pwll Du, Pwll Du Cave Management Group
- Brockway, Derek; Carey, Julian (23 November 2006), Weatherman Walking, Y Lolfa, ISBN 978-0-86243-917-0
- Browne, David M.; Hughes, Stephen (2003), The Archaeology of the Welsh Uplands, Royal Commission on the Ancient and Historical Monuments of Wales, ISBN 978-1-871184-26-6
- "Dyne Steel's Incline, Blaenavon", Coflein, Royal Commission on the Ancient and Historical Monuments of Wales
- Gardener, Clive (2001), "The Tunnel History & Operation", Ghosts of Pwll Du
- "Hill's Tramroad", Coflein, Royal Commission on the Ancient and Historical Monuments of Wales
- Newman, John (1 March 2000), Gwent/Monmouthshire, Yale University Press, ISBN 978-0-300-09630-9
- Remember Pwlldu? The lost village of the Valleys, ITV, 20 March 2015
- "The Hamlet of Pwlldu", Govilon History
- "Thomas Hill's Tram Road" (PDF), Visit Blaenavon
