= Forge Side =

Coordinates: 51.77006°N 3.09556°W

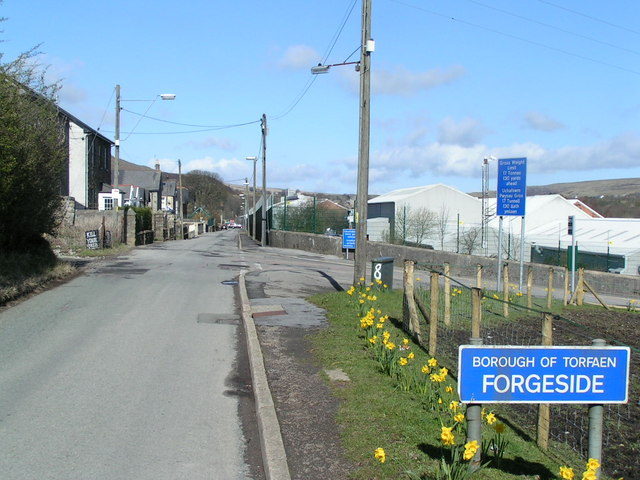
Forgeside

Forge Side (officially: Forgeside; Welsh: Ger yr Efail, officially: Geryrefail) was the site of an ironworks started in 1836. The development was soon abandoned, but resumed in 1859. A settlement of houses was built for the workers.

The rows of workers' cottages, a chapel, and a few other buildings are all that remain. The small village is 0.5 miles south-west of Blaenavon 0.5 miles south-east of Big Pit, and is in the community of Blaenavon, in the north of Torfaen county borough, in South east Wales.

== Development ==
The Blaenavon Iron and Coal Company was formed in 1836, and purchased the Blaenavon Ironworks. The new managing director, James Ashwell, started to build a new ironworks, to be called Forgeside, on a pocket of freehold land, so that the new company would be free of the rents, royalties, and insecurity of the leasehold of the old ironworks. Foundations were built for blast furnaces, forges and rolling mills.

Within a few years there was a downturn in the industry, Ashwell was forced to resign in 1841, and the new works abandoned. Building eventually resumed when the puddling forge was opened in 1859 and engines for the rolling mills were bought in 1860.

The terraced cottages for the workers were built on a grid plan, unimaginatively called Row A, Row B, Row C, Row D, and Row E. typically indicative of the attitude of the 19th century employers to their workers.

== Decline ==
The works closed in 1911, re-opened for munitions work in 1914–18, and briefly re-opened again in 1924–5. Much of the Forgeside work was sold for scrap in 1934.

== Present day ==
Very little remains of the works, although an electricity power house, built for the works in 1920, survives, and is now a Grade II listed building. Two of the terraced rows of cottages, Rows A and B, were demolished in the late 1970s. The Zion Baptist Chapel, built in 1875 with a schoolroom added in 1885, and Coity House, built for the manager of the works around 1860 are both Grade II listed buildings.

Forge Side has a rugby team, Forgeside RFC, which currently (as of 2016) play in the Swalec National League Division 3 East D. The club also has under 7's, under 9's, and under 10's teams.

Forgeside AFC was formed as a new football club in 2015. The team includes a number of former players from Blaenavon Blues and received a grant of £500 for kit and training equipment from Blaenavon Leisure and Sports Trust (BLAST).

In October 2026, Torfaen County Borough Council and the Welsh Language Commissioner, agreed that official names are "Forgeside" and "Geryrefail".
