= Hill's Tramroad =

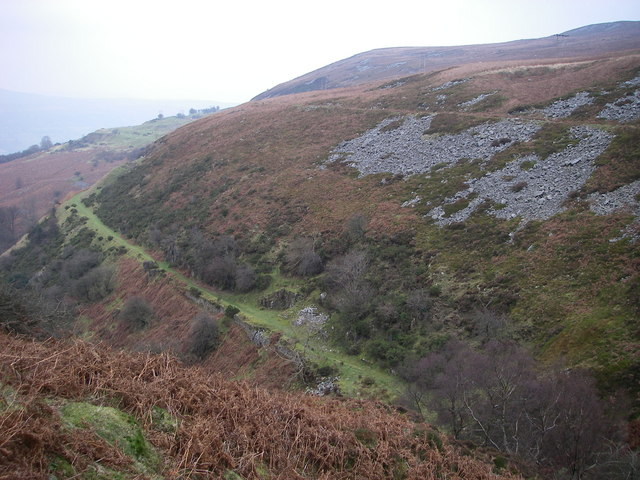
- Bench of Hill's Tramroad between Pwll-du and Garnddyrys. Line above is the leat that carried water from the balancing pond east of Pwll-du to the forge site at Garnddyrys

Overview
- Status: Defunct
- Termini: Blaenavon Ironworks; Llanfoist

Service
- Type: Tramroad

Technical
- Track gauge: 2 ft (610 mm)

Locations on the tramroad in Torfaen and Monmouthshire

Hill's Tramroad was a 2 ft (610 mm) gauge plateway for horse-drawn trams that connected the Blaenavon Ironworks to Llanfoist on the Brecknock and Abergavenny Canal. It ran through the Pwll Du Tunnel, past the Tyla and Pwll Du quarries, through Garnddyrys Forge and on to the Llanfoist wharf. The tramroad from Pwll Du to Llanfoist was abandoned in 1861 after the railway reached Blaenavon and Garnddyrys Forge was abandoned.

== History ==
In response to a surge in demand for iron during the Napoleonic Wars the manager of the Blaenavon Ironworks, Thomas Hill II, built what became called Hill's Tramroad from Pwll Du to the Llanfoist wharf around 1815. This linked Blaenavon via Pwll Du and Garnddyrys to the Brecknock and Abergavenny Canal. It connected Blaenavon to limestone quarries at Pwll-Du and Tyla. It then ran for 3 miles (4.8 km) north east from Pwll Du round the Blorenge hill to Llanfoist Wharf. The tramroad passed through the Garnddyrys site in a tunnel.

The plans to build the forge in Cwm Llanwenarth on the west branch of the Blorenge included replacing a steeply sloped section of the tramroad from Blaenavon by a shallow gradient tramroad along the Pwll Du Tunnel, an extension of an earlier mine tunnel through the hill to Pwll Du. Hill's Tramroad, a 2 ft (610 mm) gauge plateway, was opened from end to end by 1821. It carried limestone from the Tyla Quarries, mainly Tyle West, to the Blaenavon Ironworks, and carried cast iron from the ironworks to the Garnddyrys Forge. From the forge it carried wrought iron to the Llanfoist wharf on the Brecknock & Abergavenny Canal. It also carried coal and limestone from Pwll Du to the coalyard and limekilns at Llanfoist.

The Dyne-Steel incline railway over the mountain was built about 1850. The double incline ran up and over the hill above the tunnel, with a steam engine at the summit to haul up the loaded trains. (Note: The lengthy double-inclined tramroad is a distinctive feature of the landscape, visible from a distance. The northern part has been partly cut away by open cast mining in the mid-20th century, and has suffered erosion.) In 1860 the Garnddyrys works were closed, the forge was relocated to Forgeside, Blaenavon, and the northern branch of the tunnel at Pwll Du was closed. The tunnel continued to be used to carry limestone to Blaenavon. The limestone quarries closed after the General Strike of 1926, and the tunnel was no longer used.

== Sources ==
- Browne, David M.; Hughes, Stephen (2003), The Archaeology of the Welsh Uplands, Royal Commission on the Ancient and Historical Monuments of Wales, ISBN 978-1-871184-26-6
- "Dyne Steels's Incline", Coflein, Royal Commission on the Ancient and Historical Monuments of Wales
- "Garnddyrys Forge, Blorenge", Coflein, Royal Commission on Ancient and Historical Monuments of Wales
- Gardener, Clive (2001), "The Tunnel History & Operation", Ghosts of Pwll Du
- "Hill's Tramroad", Coflein, Royal Commission on the Ancient and Historical Monuments of Wales
- HLCA 011 Blorenge and Gilwern HillHistoric Landscape Characterisation, Glamorgan-Gwent Archaeological Trust
- Newman, John (2000-03-01), Gwent/Monmouthshire, Yale University Press, ISBN 978-0-300-09630-9
- Seabourne, Dave (22 July 1999), "Work starts to open up old tramroad" (PDF), Abergavenny Chronicle – via Welsh Mines Society Newsletter, November 1999
- "Thomas Hill's Tram Road" (PDF), Visit Blaenavon, archived from the original (PDF) on 2016-04-22
