= Garnddyrys Forge =

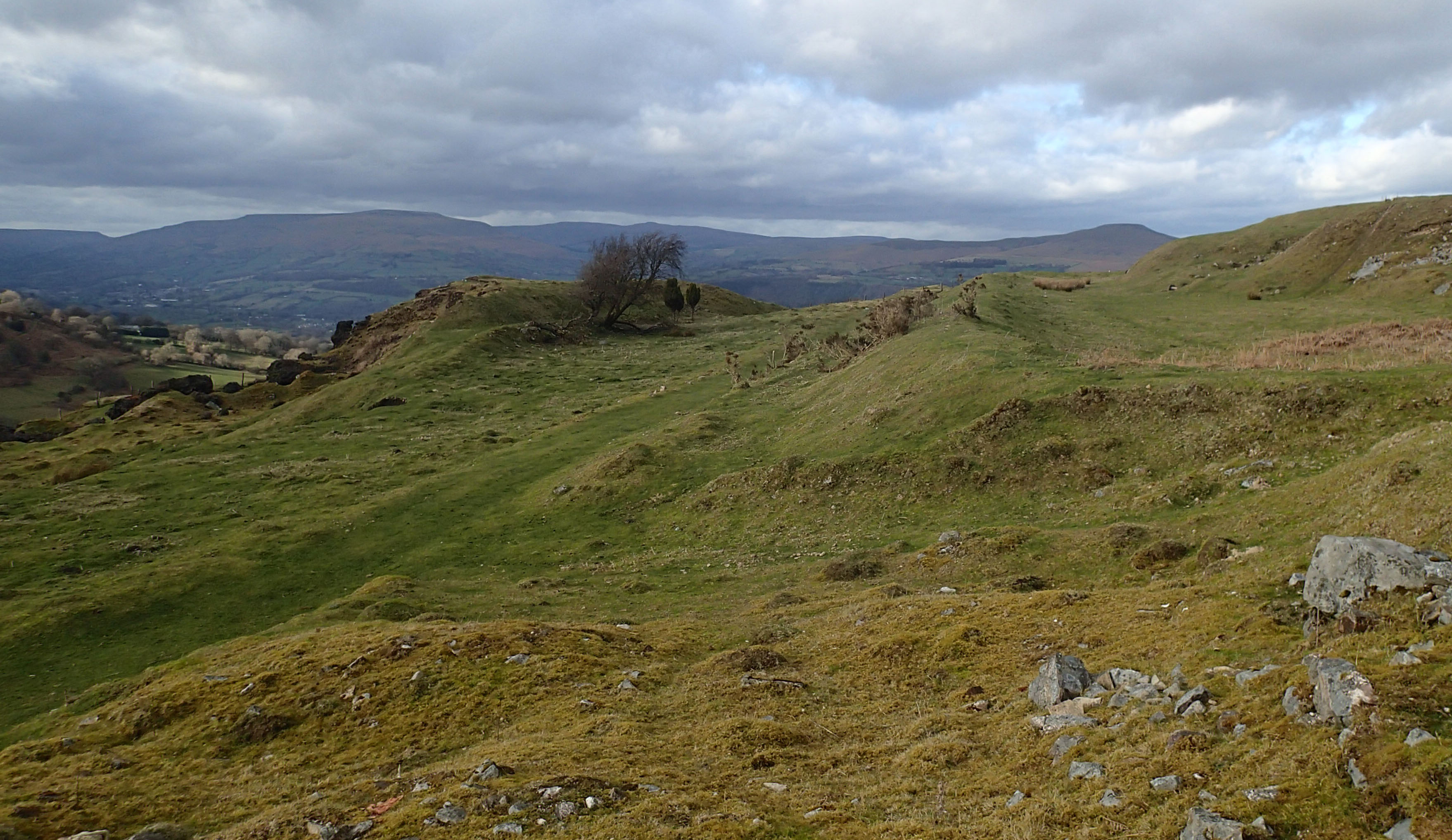
- Remains of the ironworks and tramroad

- Location within Monmouthshire
- Operated: 1817–61
- Coordinates: 51.801423°N 3.0769175°W
- Industry: Iron foundry
- Products: Wrought iron

Garnddyrys Forge was an iron foundry in Wales that operated from about 1817 to 1860 about 3 km (2 miles) north of Blaenavon in Wales, lying on a tramroad between Blaenavon and the Brecknock and Abergavenny Canal. At one time 450 people lived around the ironworks. It became isolated when the railway took a different route to Blaenavon, and was abandoned. Although little now is visible, it is archaeologically well-preserved.

== History ==
In response to a surge in demand for iron during the Napoleonic Wars the manager of the Blaenavon Ironworks, Thomas Hill II, built what became called Hill's Tramroad from Pwll Du to the Llanfoist wharf around 1815. This linked Blaenavon via Pwll Du and Garnddyrys to the Brecknock and Abergavenny Canal. The tramroad passed through the Garnddyrys site in a tunnel. It connected Blaenavon to limestone quarries at Pwll-Du and Tyla. It then ran for 3 miles (4.8 km) north east from Pwll Du round the Blorenge hill to Llanfoist Wharf.

The Garnddyrys Forge (Note: Alexander Cordell made the Garnddyrys Forge famous in his Rape of the Fair Country (1959).) was built by Thomas Hill II in 1816–17. The market for iron was very weak at the time, so the investment was unusual. The plans to build the forge in Cwm Llanwenarth on the west branch of the Blorenge included replacing a steeply sloped section of the tramroad from Blaenavon by a shallow gradient tramroad along the Pwll Du Tunnel, an extension of an earlier mine tunnel through the hill to Pwll Du. The tramroad brought cast iron from Blaenavon and took wrought iron from the forge to the Llanfoist wharf.

By the 1840s there were about 450 people living around the Garnddyrys Forge. Garnddyrys became isolated in 1854 when the railway reached Blaenavon. A replacement forge, called Forgeside, was built near the railway in Blaenavon. In 1860 the Garnddyrys works were closed, the forge was relocated to Forgeside, Blaenavon, and the northern branch of the tunnel at Pwll Du was closed.

== Recent years ==
The site was abandoned, and is thus important as an archaeologically well-preserved forge from the early 19th century. In 1970 the foundations of the worker's houses were excavated. The site includes two reservoirs, the sites of waterwheels and reservoirs, and workers' housing.

== Sources ==
- "Garnddyrys Forge, Blorenge", Coflein, Royal Commission on the Ancient and Historical Monuments of Wales
- Gardener, Clive (2001), "The Tunnel History & Operation", Ghosts of Pwll Du
- HLCA 011 Blorenge and Gilwern HillHistoric Landscape Characterisation, Glamorgan-Gwent Archaeological Trust
- Newman, John (2000-03-01), Gwent/Monmouthshire, Yale University Press, ISBN 978-0-300-09630-9
- "Thomas Hill's Tram Road" (PDF), Visit Blaenavon, archived from the original (PDF) on 2016-04-22
