= Municipal Offices, Blaenavon =

Municipal Building in Blaenavon, Wales

Municipal Offices
- Swyddfeydd Bwrdeistrefol Blaenafon (Welsh)
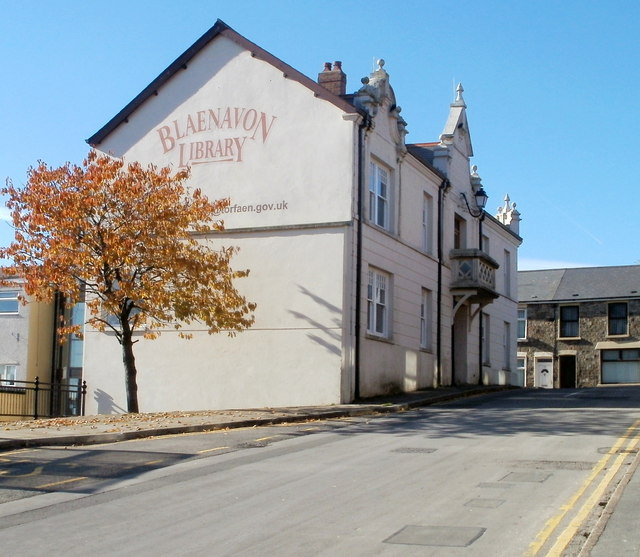
- Municipal Offices

- Shown in Torfaen
- 51.7744°N 3.0849°W
- Location: Lion Street, Blaenavon

History
- Built: 1930

Site notes
- Architect: John Morgan
- Architectural style: Neoclassical style

Listed Building – Grade II
- Official name: Council Offices (Municipal Offices)
- Designated: 9 February 1995
- Reference no.: 15278

The Municipal Offices (Welsh: Swyddfeydd Bwrdeistrefol Blaenafon) are in Lion Street, Blaenavon, Torfaen, Wales. The structure, which was used as the headquarters of Blaenavon Urban District Council, is a Grade II listed building.

== History ==
Following significant population growth, largely associated with the local ironworks, a local board of health was established in Blaenavon in 1858 and subsequently established its offices in an existing building in Lion Street; after the area became an urban district in 1894, the new urban district council retained the building as its offices.

By the late 1920s, the building had become dilapidated and council officials decided to demolish the it and to commission bespoke offices on the same site. The new building was designed by the town surveyor, John Morgan, in the neoclassical style, built in brick with a rusticated stucco finish on the ground floor and with a rendered roughcast finish on the first floor, and was completed in 1930. The design involved a broadly symmetrical main frontage with five bays facing onto Lion Street. The central bay featured a doorway which was flanked by brackets supporting a stone balcony; there were French doors on the first floor and a Dutch gable with finials above. Additional Dutch gables were used as decoration above the first bay on the left and above the canted bay on the corner with the High Street. Internally, the principal room was the council chamber on the first floor.

The building continued to serve as the offices of the urban district council for much of the 20th century, but ceased to be the local seat of government when the enlarged Torfaen District Council was established in 1974. It was then used by Torfaen District Council as a "sub-office" until the early 1990s, when it was abandoned and the building started deteriorating badly. A major programme of restoration works, costing £800,000, was completed in 2001. On completion of the works, the local public library, which had been based in a former school building in Park Street, relocated to the municipal offices. The Blaenavon Museum, which had acquired the collection of the novelist, Alexander Cordell, moved into the basement of the municipal offices in 2002.

However, in 2015, Torfaen Council decided to rationalise its estate and, after the library had moved to the Blaenavon World Heritage in Church Road and museum had relocated to the Blaenavon Workmen's Hall, the municipal offices were sold to a private investor for commercial use in 2016.
