= James Ashwell =

British engineer and director (1799–1881)

James Ashwell (1799-1881) was a British engineer and director, working in the coal, iron, and railway industries. In 1836, he helped in the formation of the Blaenavon Iron and Coal Company and was appointed resident managing director.

== Early life ==
James Ashwell was born in 1799 in Nottingham. He attended Nottingham Grammar School and later Edinburgh University. As a school boy, he showed an interest in his father's businesses in iron and coal. A visit to Manchester and Leeds in 1816, where he was fascinated by steam mills and machinery, particularly steam locomotives, led to his decision to be an engineer.

== Training ==
He trained as an engineer with Bryan Donkin, and became friends with Henry Robinson Palmer, who was often employed by Thomas Telford to make surveys. Ashwell assisted Palmer on surveys in East Anglia. While still training, he was involved in starting what is now the Institution of Civil Engineers.

== Work ==
After completing his training, Ashwell worked at ironworks in Derbyshire and Scotland. In 1836, he helped in the formation of the Blaenavon Iron and Coal Company and was appointed resident managing director. Ashwell started to build a new ironworks, to be called Forgeside, on a pocket of freehold land, so that the new company would be free of the rents, royalties, and insecurity of the leasehold of the old ironworks. Foundations were built for blast furnaces, forges and rolling mills.

While at Blaenavon, Ashwell was responsible for the magnificent water balance tower (known locally as the guillotine because of the sight of two cages passing the oval openings) at Blaenavon Ironworks, which is now a Grade I listed building. He was also responsible for other water balance lifts at coal pits and quarries associated with the company.

Within a few years, there was a downturn in the industry. Ashwell was forced to resign in 1841, and the new works at Forgeside abandoned (although it was later restarted in 1859). Ashwell moved to Cambridge, where his sons studied, and himself studied for an MA and BA.

His health deteriorated and his doctor, Benjamin Brodie, advised him not to return to his studies but to travel abroad. When travelling, he was commissioned to report on the Great Luxembourg Railway Company and became Managing Director and Engineer in Chief of the company from 1847 to 1852. The company was embroiled in a dispute with the Belgian government resulting in a lawsuit. The company was acquitted but Ashwell suffered financially and his health deteriorated.

== Retirement ==
Ashwell returned to England to study Hebrew and harmony and died on 2 July 1881 at his home, Mildway Lodge, in Weston-super-Mare
