= Thomas Hill of Dennis =

Welsh industrialist

Thomas Hill of Dennis (c. 1736-1824), also known as Thomas Hill or latterly Thomas Hill I, to distinguish him from his son, was an ironmaster, and the leading partner in the establishment of Blaenavon Ironworks in south east Wales.

== Early life ==
Thomas Hill was born near Stourbridge around 1736. His father, Waldron, was the brother of another Thomas, and Elizabeth who married Humphrey Batchelor (who later inherited Fimbrell glasshouse, Coalbournhill Glassworks, and Dennis Glassworks). (Note: For more information on the Batchelor glassmaking family, see The history of broad & bottle glass production in East Shropshire, by Paul Andrew Luter, pp4-5.) When Humphrey Batchelor died Elizabeth continued to manage the glassworks with the help of her two brothers. Elizabeth had two children, but they died before she died in 1762. She rewarded her brothers by leaving them most of her wealth, the glass making business and the Dennis estate.

Thomas Hill's family included two brothers, Joseph and Waldron, and two sisters, Mary and Sarah. He married Ann Melsup in 1766.

Meanwhile, Uncle Thomas, who remained unmarried, eventually owned the Dennis estate outright and demolished the existing building to create Dennis House. The house later became known as Dennis Hall and is now a Grade II listed building. Uncle Thomas died in 1782 leaving most of his wealth to his nephew, Thomas Hill. When his father died Thomas Hill inherited the majority of his father's estate.

By 1785 Thomas Hill owned mills at Wollaston, Brookmoor and Wombourne, ironworks and a bank at Stourport, and various properties including Wollaston Hall, Prestwood House, Broome House (with a farm), and land at Chaddesley.

== Blaenavon ==
When the leases on land around Blaenavon, also known as Lord Abergavenny’s Hills, were not renewed Thomas Hill, as senior partner, with Thomas Hopkins and Benjamin Pratt, took the chance to invest £40,000 in the area which they knew was rich in mineral deposits.

By 1789 most of the building of Blaenavon Ironworks had been completed and the lease for the land was signed in November. The three partners had created a purpose-built multi-furnace ironwork which soon became one of the largest in the world only rivalled by the ironworks near Merthyr Tydfil.

To improve communications with the port of Newport for shipping the products of the ironworks Thomas Hill became one of the promoters of the Monmouthshire Canal. The route to the port using the Blaenavon Railroad, a horse-drawn tramroad, and canal opened in February 1976.

Of the original partnership Thomas Hopkins died in 1793. He left his 25% share in the company to his son, Samuel Hopkins, who became resident manager of the work. Benjamin Pratt died in 1794, leaving all of his wealth to Hill. Hill and his nephew, Samuel Hopkins, continued to manage the works until Hopkins death in 1815.

Hill was appointed High Sheriff of Worcestershire in 1796.

== Legacy ==
Thomas Hill died in 1824 at his home in Stourbridge, Dennis Hall, and was buried at St Mary's Church, Oldswinford. He left most of estate to his sons Thomas (Thomas Hill II) and Waldron, and his grandson Thomas (Thomas Hill III).

In 1804 Hill and Samuel Hopkins, both devout men, paid for the building of an Anglican church, St Peter's, at Blaenavon which was consecrated in 1805.

Thomas Hill also founded 14 schools in the area around Stourbridge, and also paid for a church at Lye, inspired by the church at Blaenavon, in 1813, where he rented a pew. The church was later called Christ Church.
