= Blorenge =

Mountain in southeast Wales

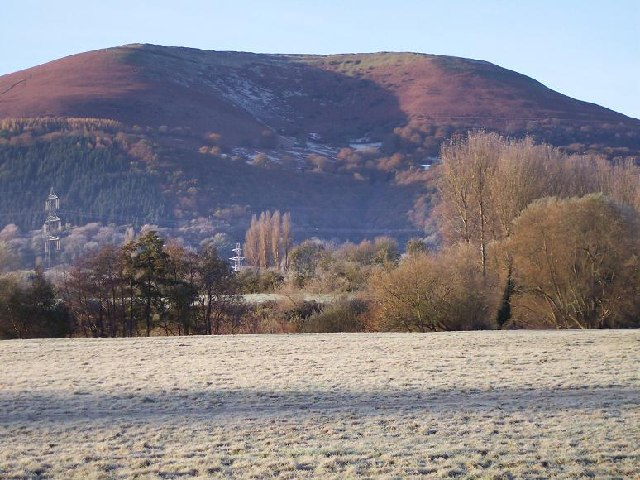
- Blorenge from Abergavenny

Highest point
- Elevation: 561 m (1,841 ft)
- Prominence: 134 m (440 ft)
- Parent peak: Coity Mountain
- Listing: Dewey, HuMP

Geography
- Location: Monmouthshire, Wales
- Parent range: Brecon Beacons
- OS grid: SO269118
- Topo map: OS Landranger 161

Blorenge, also called The Blorenge (/ˈblɒrɪndʒ/; Welsh: Blorens), is a prominent hill overlooking the valley of the River Usk near Abergavenny, Monmouthshire, southeast Wales. It is situated in the southeastern corner of the Brecon Beacons National Park. The summit plateau reaches a height of 561 metres (1,841 ft).

== Geography ==
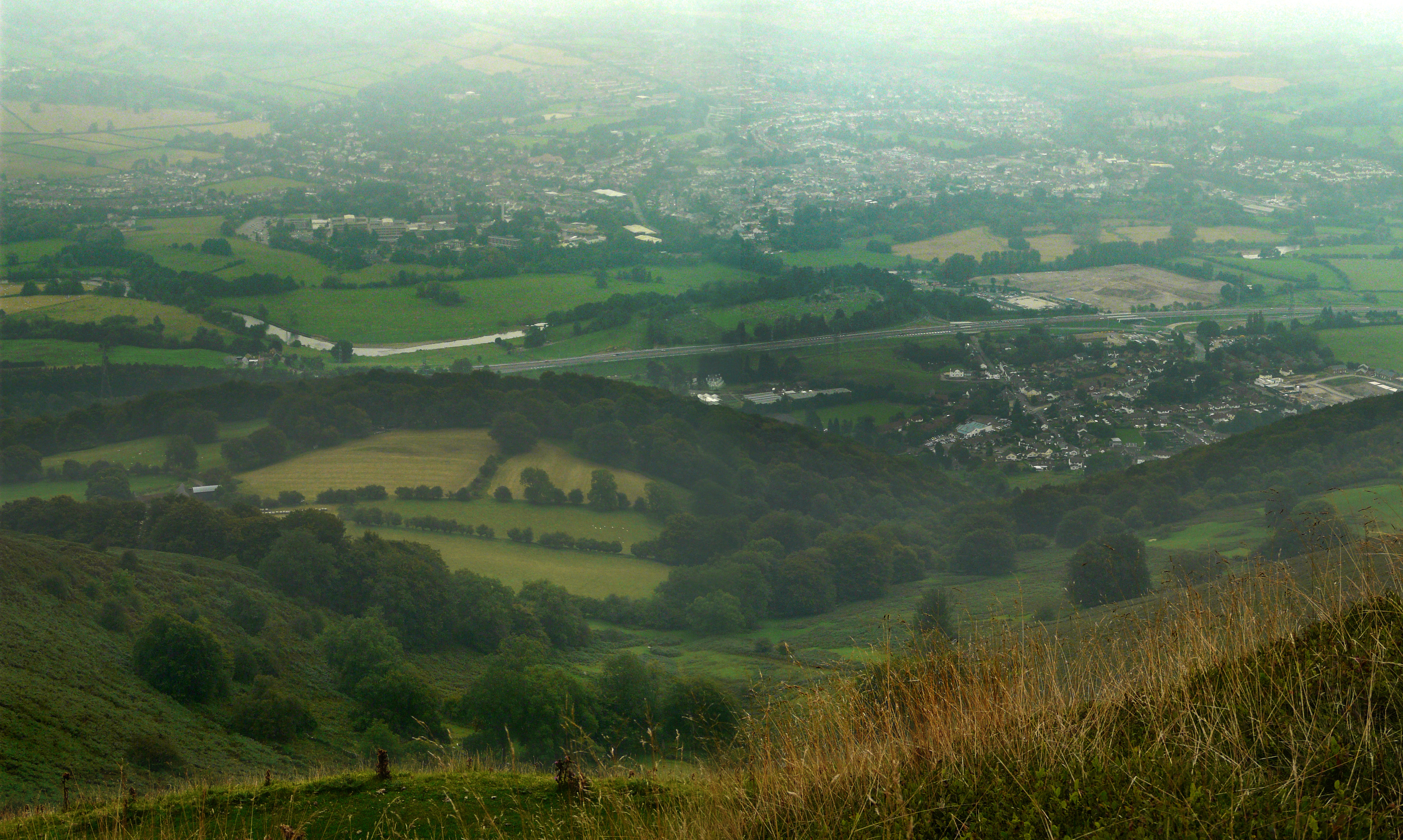
View from a point near the summit of Blorenge

Blorenge overlooks the market town of Abergavenny and the villages of Llanfoist, Llanellen and Govilon in the Usk Valley to the north. At the foot of the hill lies the Monmouthshire & Brecon Canal. It drops away steeply to the northwest into Cwm Llanwenarth. To the south, gentler slopes fall away to Blaenavon at the head of the Lwyd valley. Prominent peaks seen from the Blorenge include the Skirrid to the east of Abergavenny and the Sugar Loaf to the north. The high moorland ridge continues to the south of the minor road at Foxhunter car park and assumes the name Mynydd y Garn-fawr. The cairn referenced in the title of this southerly shoulder of Blorenge may be that now known as Carn y Defaid which sits on the county boundary at a height of 503m. It is the most prominent amongst a handful of Bronze Age burial cairns.

== Geology ==
Blorenge is composed in layer-cake fashion of a number of rock types. Its lower slopes are formed from the sandstones and mudstones deposited during the Devonian period and known collectively as the Old Red Sandstone. Its higher reaches are formed from a suite of mudstones, limestones and sandstones of Carboniferous age. The summit plateau is formed from coarse sandstones that lie at the boundary of the Millstone Grit and the Coal Measures. All of these beds tilt south-westwards into the South Wales Coalfield basin.

The shape of the hill was modified during the ice ages as the Usk Valley glacier flowed past it to its north. A small glacier nourished by windblown snow from the plateau excavated the hollow on the eastern side of Blorenge which is known as The Punchbowl. Cwm Craf on the hill's north-eastern slopes has a cirque-like form though probably never harboured a full-grown glacier. Small landslips affect Blorenge's slopes, the most well-known of which is the Tumble through which the B4246 climbs towards Keeper's Pond.

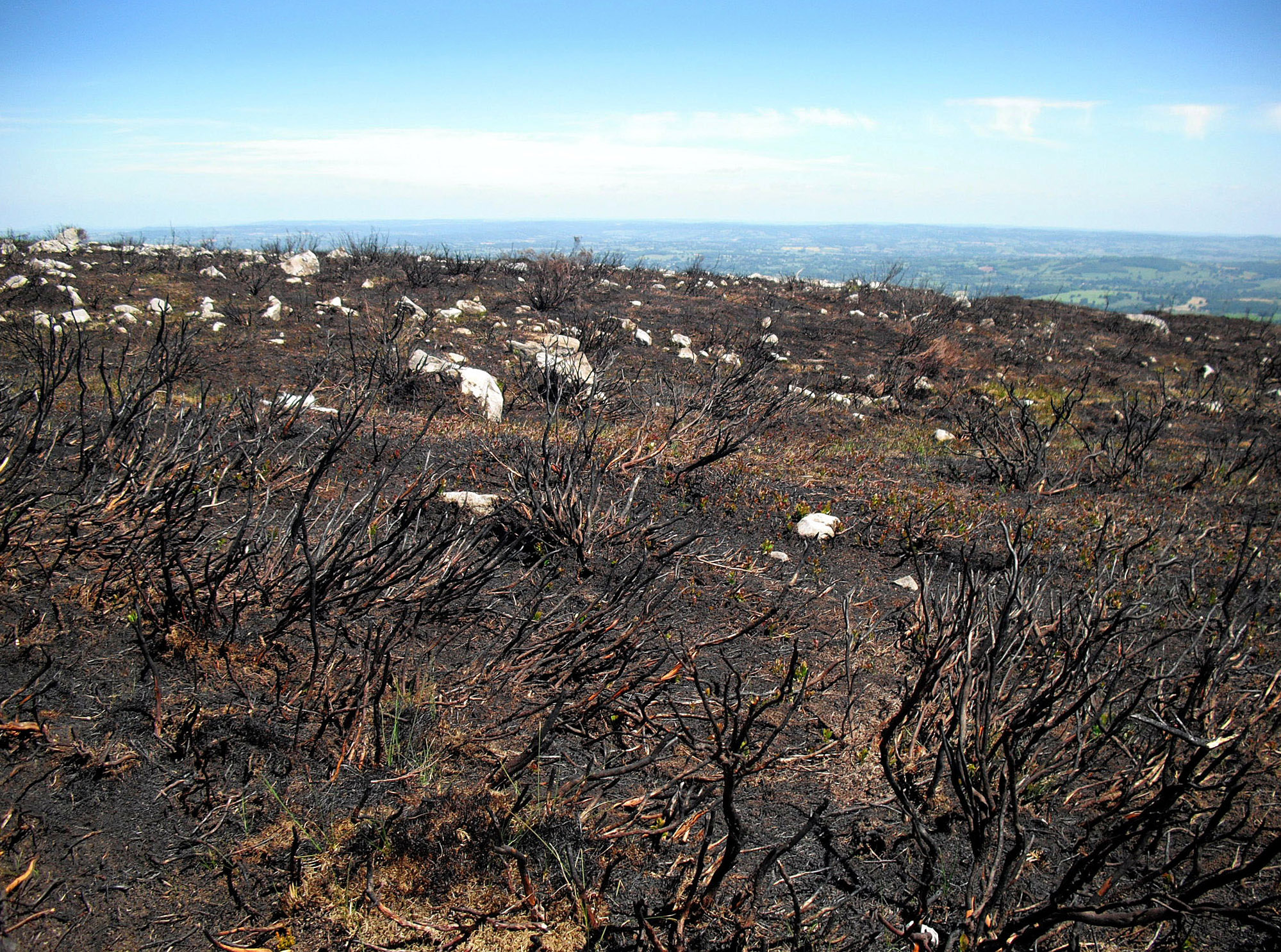
Wildfire damage near the top of Blorenge, near Abergavenny, south Wales, in 2010.

== Protected areas ==
Blorenge is situated within both the Brecon Beacons National Park and the Blaenavon Industrial Landscape, a World Heritage Site. Much of the hill has also been designated a Site of Special Scientific Interest principally for its heather moorland which is important for breeding red grouse. The Punchbowl is owned and managed by the Woodland Trust as a nature reserve.

== Access ==
Most of the hill is open access for walkers and there are a number of footpaths and bridleways which run to and over it. There is a hillwalking trail that runs around Blorenge and is a very popular destination for tourists and walkers alike. The ascent on foot to the summit from Llanfoist / Abergavenny via Cwm Craf is very steep but the effort is repaid by the panoramic views from the summit across the valley of the River Usk to Abergavenny and the Black Mountains, Wales. Easier access both to the summit and the northern edge of the plateau can be had from the Foxhunter car park.

== Recreation ==
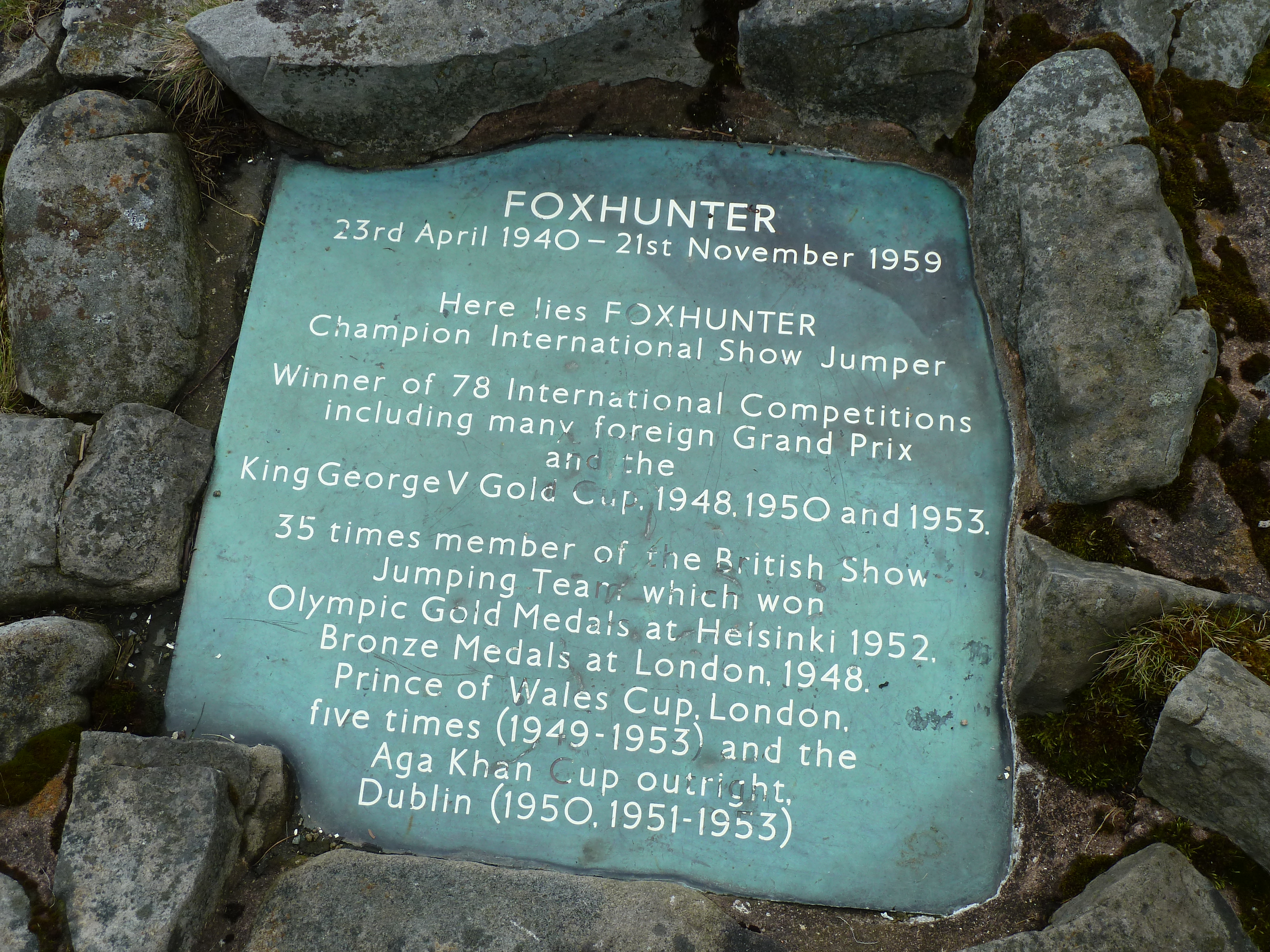
Plaque marking the grave of Foxhunter

Most visitors are walkers and sightseers. Some come to see the grave of Sir Harry Llewellyn's famous showjumping horse, Foxhunter, who won Britain's only Gold medal in the 1952 Summer Olympics. Foxhunter is buried near to the Blaenavon to Llanover road on Blorenge. A car park here is named in his honour.

Paragliders and hang gliders regularly take off from the summit. Paragliders performing 'top to bottom' flights often land in Castle Meadows beside the River Usk at Abergavenny.

Every November a 'category A' fell race takes place on the mountain starting and finishing at St Faith's Church at Llanfoist. The race route passes under the Monmouthshire and Brecon Canal.

There is also a Great Taste Award winning pale ale named after this hill and produced not far away in Llanhilleth.

== Industrial heritage ==
The remains of a tramway, built about 1796, linking a limestone quarry on the north side of the mountain with the ironworks at Blaenavon can be seen near 51.807°N 3.060°W. Hill's Tramroad extends around the western flanks of the hill and drops steeply down to Llanfoist by means of a series of inclines beneath Cwm Craf. There are extensive abandoned workings for limestone around the northern and eastern rim of Blorenge and in the vicinity of Foxhunter car park and to its south, abandoned sandstone quarries. Traces of the former practice of hushing for ironstone can be seen near to Keeper's Pond. The Monmouthshire and Brecon Canal, formerly the Brecknock and Abergavenny Canal, wraps around the foot of Blorenge to the north and east.

== Etymology ==
It has been suggested that the mountain's name may derive from the Welsh plor ('pimple') and relating to Middle English blure ('blister'), or else from blawr ais ('grey ribbed').

== Blorenge in popular culture ==
Blorenge is believed to be a source of inspiration for Cecil Frances Humphreys Alexander's hymn "All Things Bright And Beautiful". The fourth verse starts "The purple headed mountain, the river running by". "The purple headed mountain" is believed to be Blorenge, "The river running by" the Usk beneath.

"Blorenge" is one of very few words in the English language which is a perfect rhyme for "orange".

== Cycling "the Tumble" ==
The Tumble / Y Tymbol
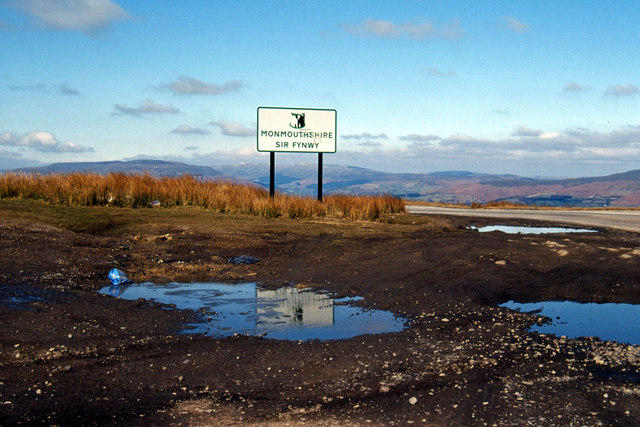
- The summit of The Tumble
- Start: Govilon
- Gain in altitude: 347 m (1,138 ft)
- Length of climb: 4.1 km (2.5 mi)
- Maximum elevation: 482 m (1,581 ft)
- Average gradient: 9.0 %

The western edge of Blorenge is crossed by the B4246 road between Llanfoist and Blaenavon which passes over the climb known as "The Tumble" ("Y Tymbol"), which reaches an elevation of 482 m (1,581 ft) close to Keepers Pond (Pen-ffordd-goch Pond) (at 51°47′19″N 3°04′57″W). The climb is regularly featured in cycle races, and has hosted the finish of the final stage of the Junior Tour of Wales since 1989. It is listed as one of the 100 Greatest Cycling Climbs in Britain. The signs at the summit indicate incorrectly that the elevation is 512 m (1,680 ft).

From Govilon, the climb is 4.1 km (2.5 mi) long, gaining 347 m (1,138 ft) in altitude, at an average gradient of 9.0%. Stage 3 of the 2014 Tour of Britain finished at the summit on 9 September 2014, when the stage winner was the Italian rider, Edoardo Zardini. and in the 2025 it was used twice used as a climb in stage 5 of the Tour of Britain, and the stage was won by Remco Evenepoel.
