= Afon Lwyd =

River in south-east Wales

Coordinates: 51°37′05″N 2°57′12″W

Afon Lwyd Afon Llwyd
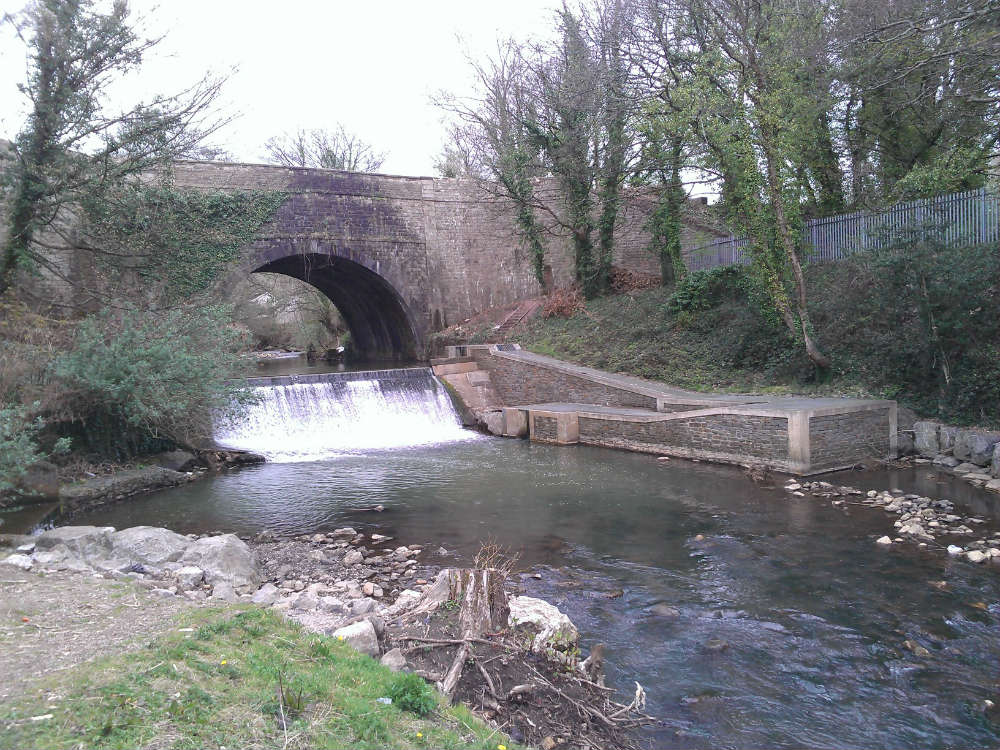
- The Afon Lwyd weir and fish leap at Pontymoile. The bridge carries the Monmouthshire and Brecon Canal.

Location
- Country: Wales
- Region: South East Wales
- District: Torfaen

Physical characteristics
- Source
  - location: between Brynmawr and Blaenavon, Torfaen, Wales
- Discharge
  - location: Caerleon

Basin features
- Tributaries
  - left: Nant y Gollen, Nant Dar, Nant Ffrwd Oer, Trosnant

Afon Lwyd, or Afon Llwyd (Welsh for 'grey river'), is a 13-mile (21-kilometer) long river in south-east Wales which flows from its source northwest of Blaenavon, through Abersychan, Pontnewynydd, Pontypool, Llanfrechfa and Cwmbran before flowing, at Caerleon, into the River Usk, which subsequently flows into the Bristol Channel to the south of Newport.

The river was severely affected by pollution from industry and mine discharge, and fly tipping, but during the 1980s efforts were made to improve water quality and improve fish stocks. To aid this, the Environment Agency Wales built a fish ladder at Pontymoile in 2010 enabling fish to ascend past the weir there. In late 2011 it was claimed that the river was in its cleanest state since medieval times.

Historically, the river has also been known as the "Torfaen" – meaning 'breaker of stones' – which gives some indication of the force of the river during surges. Although this name is no longer in use for the river, the name is used to the wider area, now known as Torfaen, and its local authority Torfaen County Borough Council.

== Flooding risk ==
The geography of the river's location, as well as how local towns affect run-off, has meant that during periods of heavy rainfall the river can quickly become a torrent and localised flash floods are not uncommon. The last major flood of the river occurred in the 1930s.

== Conservation projects ==
Founded in March 2010, the Friends of Afon Llwyd (FOAL) project is a partnership between Torfaen County Borough Council and two local angling clubs in Cwmbran and Pontypool aiming to improve the river as a habitat for salmon, sea trout and brown trout. The Wye and Usk Foundation also received £130,000 of funding to remove invasive weeds, manage bank erosion, create fish leaps, drop weirs and improve community engagement with the river both by fishing and other means. Nearly £750,000 has and will be spent on improving the river.

A major effort of the FOAL project has been to lower a weir that blocked upstream fish migration at Ty Nant Ddu, Pontypool. In 2008, salmon were spotted here. Additionally, similar efforts were made at the weir located near Cwmavon. To further improve fish stocks (especially salmonid) 'V' weirs were constructed to trap gravel and create suitable spawning habitats.

== American crayfish infestation ==
The river has been invaded by the American signal crayfish, which is affecting the native protected white-clawed crayfish. Not only does the invading species fight for food resources, but it also carries crayfish plague, to which the native species has no immunity.

== Afon Lwyd Trail ==
The Afon Lwyd Trail is a shared-use 16-mile (26 km) path running from Blaenavon Ironworks in the north via Pontypool to Cwmbran in the south. The path initially follows the Monmouthshire and Brecon Canal followed by a section on the former Pontypool to Blaenavon railway. The trail incorporates two National Cycle Network routes: 49 and 492.

== See also ==
- List of rivers of Wales
