= Blaenavon Ironworks =

Former ironworks transformed into a museum

- Gwaith Haearn Blaenafon (Welsh)
- Blaenafon Ironworks
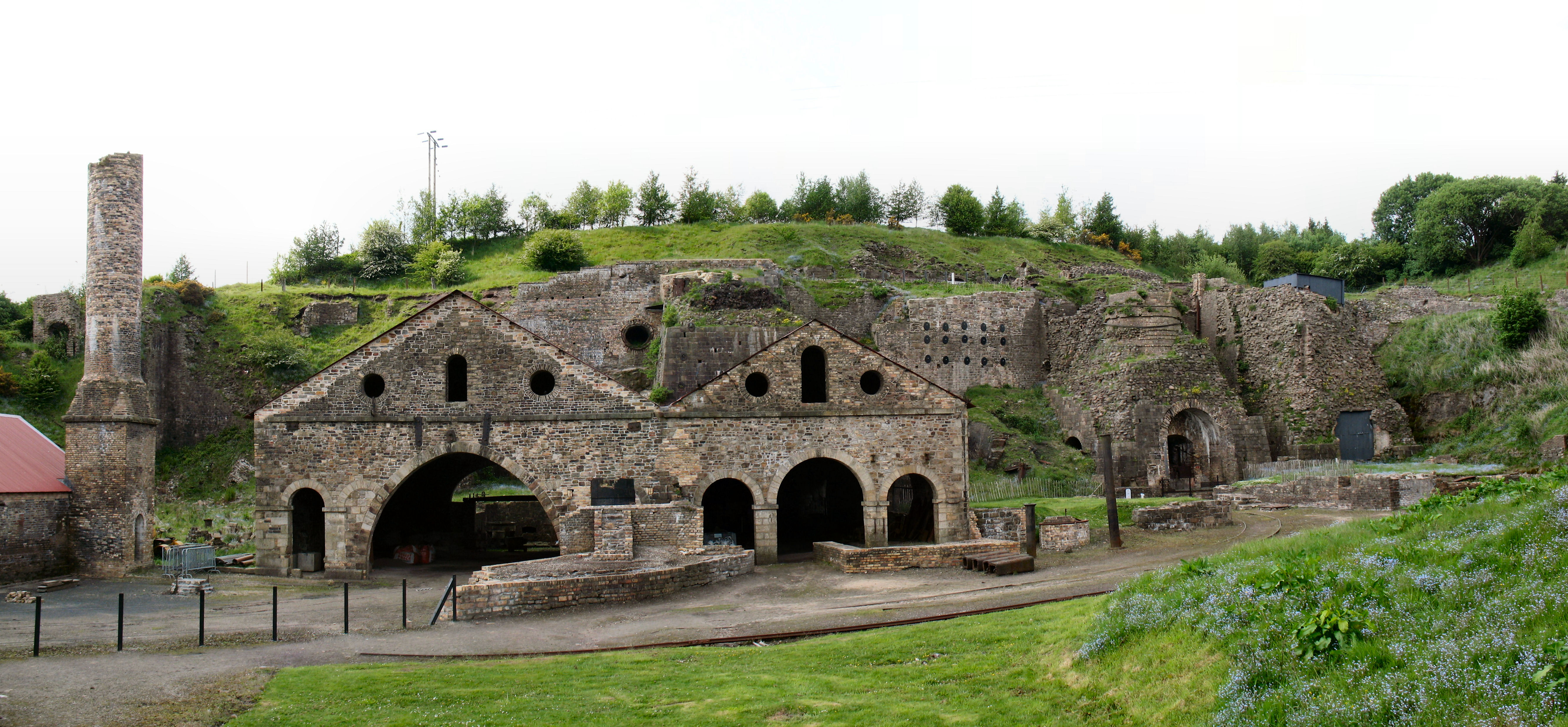

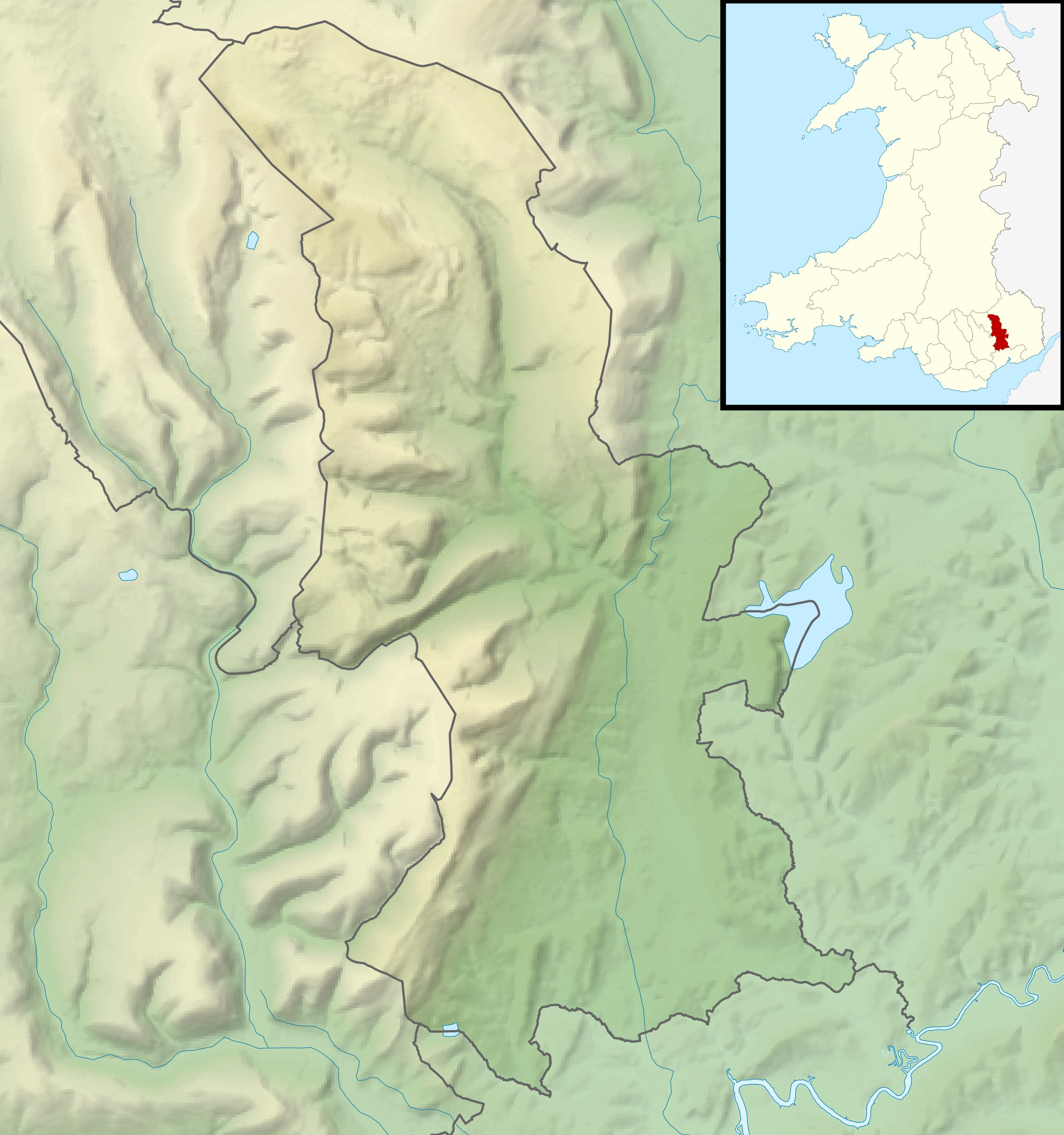
- Location within Torfaen
- 51.7765°N 3.0887°W
- Type: Ironworks
- Location: Blaenavon, Torfaen, Wales

Site notes
- Owner: Cadw
- Website: Blaenafon Ironworks (Cadw)

UNESCO World Heritage Site
- Official name: Blaenavon Industrial Landscape
- Designated: 2000

Listed Building – Grade I
- Official name: Cast House and Foundry
- Designated: 9 February 1995
- Reference no.: 15296

Listed Building – Grade I
- Official name: Blast Furnances
- Designated: 9 February 1995
- Reference no.: 15294

Listed Building – Grade I
- Official name: Balance Tower
- Designated: 9 February 1995
- Reference no.: 15292

Blaenavon Ironworks (Welsh: Gwaith Haearn Blaenafon), officially spelled Blaenafon Ironworks since 2024, is a former industrial site which is now a museum in Blaenavon (Welsh: Blaenafon), Wales. The ironworks was of crucial importance in the development of the ability to use cheap, low quality, high sulphur iron ores worldwide. It was the site of the experiments by Sidney Gilchrist Thomas and his cousin Percy Gilchrist that led to "the basic steel process" or "Gilchrist–Thomas process".

The ironworks is on the outskirts of Blaenavon, in the county borough of Torfaen, within the Blaenavon Industrial Landscape, a World Heritage Site. The site is under the care of Cadw, the Welsh Government's historic environment service. Since 2024, Cadw, who manage the site, use the Welsh spelling "Blaenafon" rather than "Blaenavon" in English.

== History of the works ==
=== Early history ===
Evidence of ironworking in the South Wales Valleys dates from the Roman period. In the 17th century, the Hanburys of Pontypool undertook tinplate manufacture in the area around Blaenavon. The land was the property of Lord Abergavenny, known as Lord Abergavenny's Hills, and in 1788 Henry Nevill, 2nd Earl of Abergavenny granted a renewal of the lease on 12,000 acres to three Midlands businessmen, Thomas Hill, his brother-in-law Thomas Hopkins and Benjamin Pratt. The commercial advantage of the area was that the three essential elements for iron production, coal, iron ore and limestone, all outcropped on the land surface in the western valleys, allowing for their much easier, horizontal, extraction rather than requiring the construction of deep, vertical, mines. Work constructing the ironworks began immediately and included several cottages for workers. Blaenavon Ironworks was the first in Wales to be designed as a multi-furnace site from the outset, with three furnaces, calcining kilns, workers’ accommodation and a company shop.

=== Archdeacon Coxe’s visit 1799 ===
William Coxe visited Blaenavon during 1798–99 and enthusiastically described the small town as “an opulent and increasing establishment, ...surrounded with heaps of ore, coal and limestone”. The ironworks demanded a skilled and permanent labour force, which the Eastern Valley of Monmouthshire lacked. Previous iron works at nearby Pontypool, for instance, had relied on charcoal and water.

The nature of the work introduced to Blaenavon was different including changes to the coal-using technology and the application of steam power, not used until that time in the Eastern Valley. Skilled workers came mainly from West Wales, Staffordshire, Gloucestershire, Herefordshire, Somerset and Ireland. Unskilled men, often with families, came for the promise of work. The population of the district expanded from a little over 1,000 in 1800 to 5115 in 1840, with 61% speaking Welsh and the remainder English.

=== 19th century ===
By 1800 Blaenavon Ironworks contributed greatly to South Wales becoming the foremost iron-producing region in the world. Production at Blaenavon was second only to Cyfarthfa Ironworks in Merthyr Tydfil, the largest iron producer in Wales. Two new furnaces were added over the next decade and in 1804 a forge was constructed in nearby Cwmavon. By 1833 the company owned 430 houses and employed 1000 workers but suffered a periodic boom-and-bust economy that accompanied iron-making with wage cuts, strikes, and the emergence of "Scotch Cattle".

In 1836, the works was bought by the Blaenavon Iron and Coal Company, financed by Londoner Robert Kennard, later an MP. Led by new managing director James Ashwell, a huge investment was made in the ironworks, including the construction of the impressive balance tower which utilised a water displacement lift to carry pig iron from the base of the site to the Brecknock and Abergavenny Canal system, which offered lower tolls to Newport than the Monmouthshire Canal. After this £138,000 investment the site showed little sign of profit and Ashwell was forced to resign in 1840. In the following years, iron rails produced at Blaenavon were exported all over the world, including India, Russia, and Brazil; but also in projects closer to home such as the construction of Crumlin Viaduct.

When Ashwell resigned, Mr. Scrivener became manager of the works and production picked up for a short while. In 1845 sales reached a peak of 35,549 tons out of which 20,732 tons were sold. This was a rise of 5,000 tons on sales for the previous year. However, fluidity was uncertain. By 1847 sales had declined to 18,981 tons. The works continued to suffer. A lower amount of pig iron was produced in 1849, partly due to the furnaces being out of action for three months. It was claimed, however, that this was the consequence of workmen refusing to submit to a reduction in wages, which the depressed state of the iron industry had rendered necessary.

The company was relaunched in 1870 as the Blaenavon Iron & Steel Company and was one of only six south Wales ironworks that successfully made the change to steel production. By 1878 the company employed 5,000 people but had greatly overreached itself financially and failed against tough competition. With financial ruin just around the corner, the company was given some respite thanks to the discoveries of Sidney Gilchrist Thomas and Percy Carlyle Gilchrist which enabled the use of the previously uneconomic phosphoric iron ore. Their experiments were carried out at Blaenavon between 1877 and 1878. This was short lived as it meant Germany and North America were now able to utilise their own phosphoric ores which accelerated the decline of Blaenavon Ironworks.

In 1880 the Blaenavon Company opened Big Pit and finally moved out of iron production.

=== 20th and 21st centuries ===
In 1904 the ironworks ceased production completely. Work restarted briefly in 1924 but was commercially unviable. The forges at the site were still being used and helped with the production of steel shell during both world wars but was mostly used as a storage yard for the National Coal Board.

In 1959 novelist Alexander Cordell set his most famous novel, Rape of the Fair Country at the ironworks and in the surrounding area at the height of the industrial revolution. At around the same time, industrial archaeology began to emerge as a discipline and the site was spared the fate of so many other 18th–19th century industrial works. In 1974 the conservation of the ironworks began. Shortly after statutory protection was provided for various sites in Blaenavon including the ironworks. In 2001, the site underwent a major restoration. The 160-year old cast iron columns at the top of the tower were taken down and the iron frame was recast and painted. The site is now in the care of Cadw. Since 2024, Cadw, who manage the site, use the Welsh spelling "Blaenafon" rather than "Blaenavon" in English, as part of an effort to standardise the names in both languages.

== Architecture and description ==
Clive Aslet describes the site at Blaenavon as "the best-preserved industrial relic of its kind".

=== Coal House and Stack Square ===
Stack Square is a small group of workers’ cottages. It featured in the BBC television series Coal House. The workers' cottages have been restored to their original design and form part of the ironworks site. They have been furnished to represent life in different eras, from the 1870s to the 1970s.

== Heritage designations ==
=== UNESCO World Heritage status ===
In 2000 the ironworks and the wider Blaenavon Industrial Landscape was awarded UNESCO World Heritage Site status, recognising the site's importance to "the pre-eminence of South Wales as the world's major producer of iron and coal in the 19th century."

=== Scheduled monument ===
Blaenavon Ironworks is a Scheduled monument.

=== Listed buildings ===
The site contains a number of listed structures. Three are at the highest listing, Grade I: the Cast House and Foundry, the Balance Tower, and the three Blast Furnaces. The remainder are listed at Grade II including: the Chain Store, the Calcining Kilns, a Storage Shed, the Pay Office, Stack Square, and a memorial to the Gilchrists.

== Gallery ==
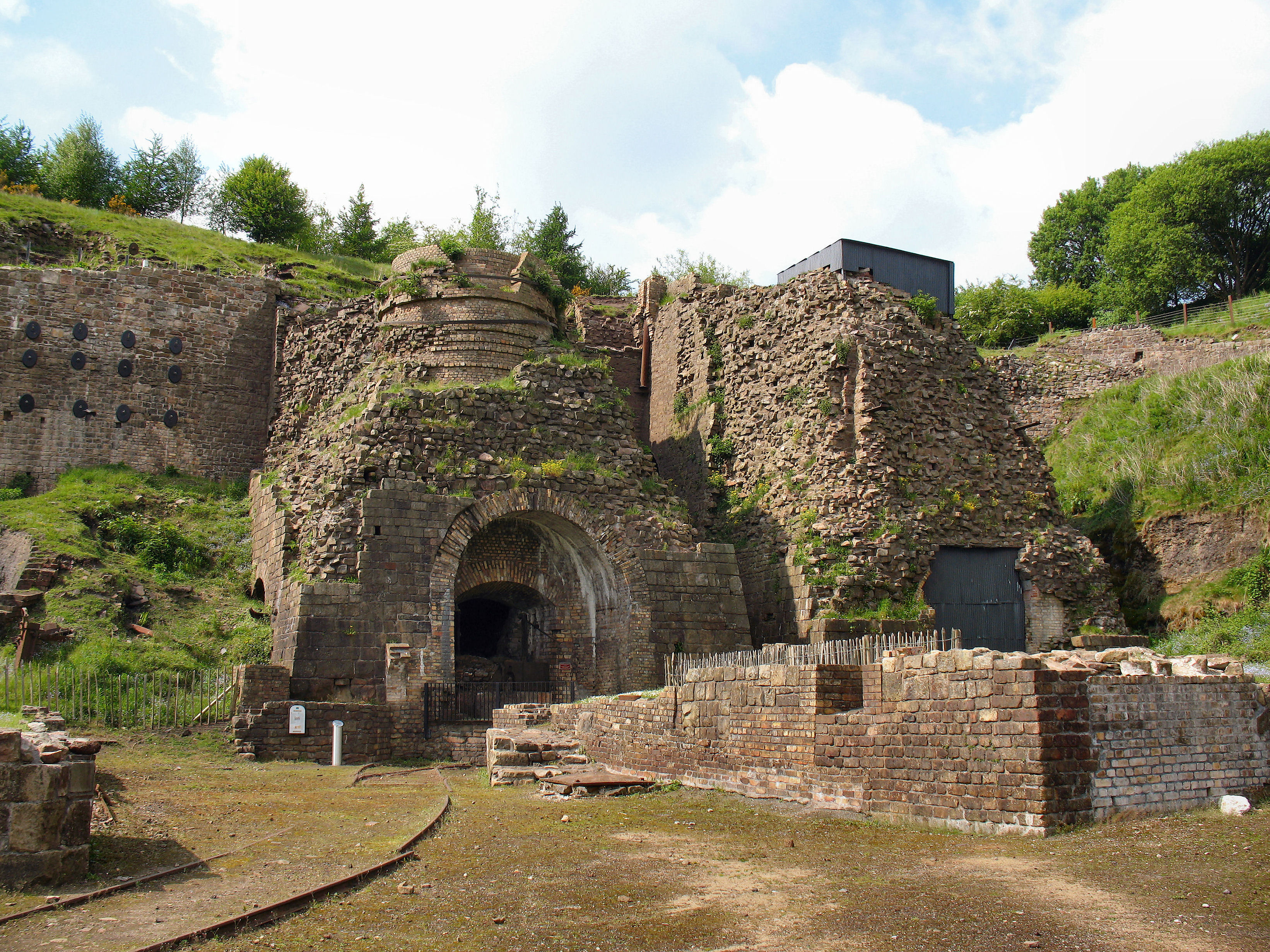
Two of the furnaces

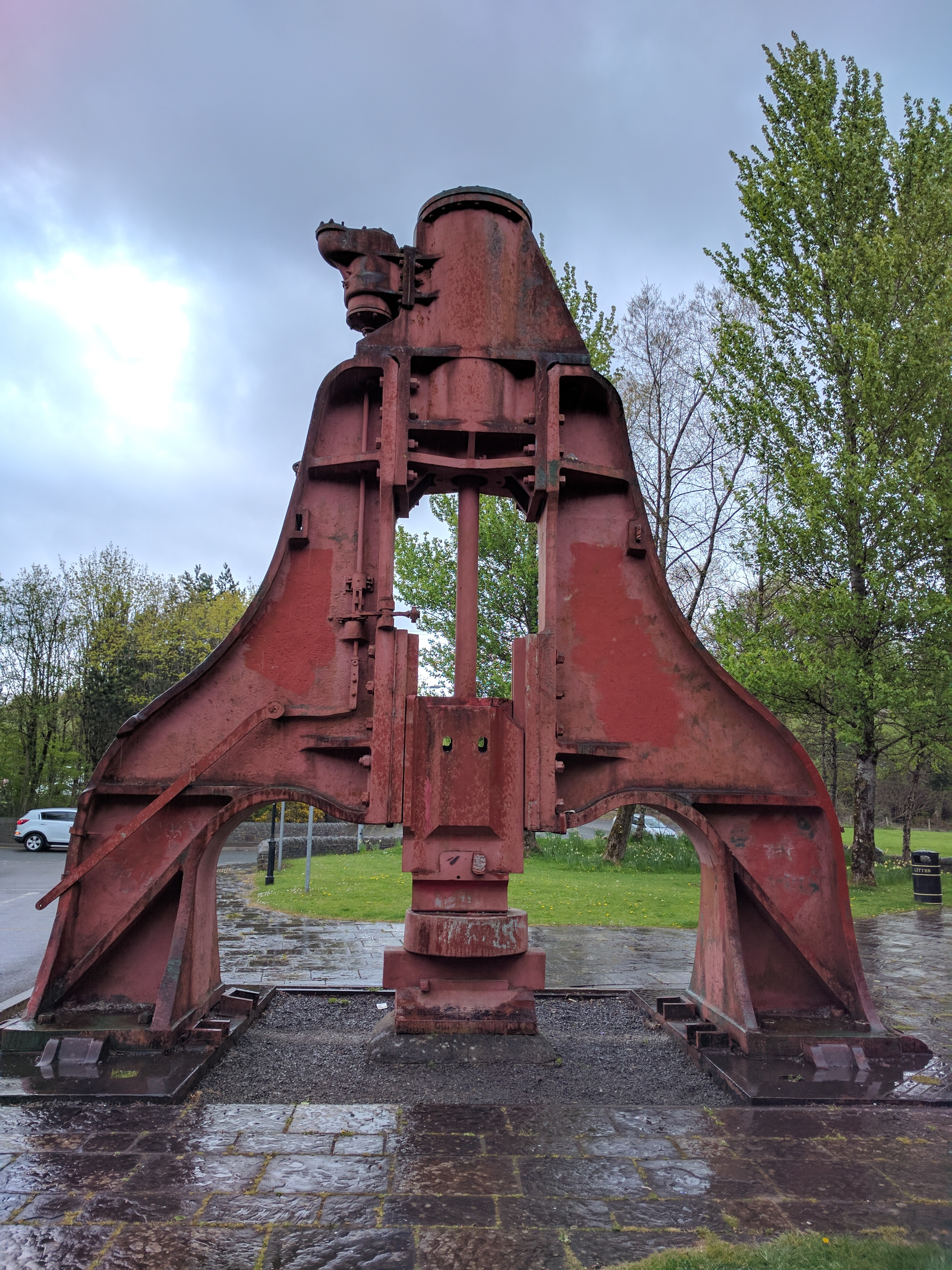
Massey steam press

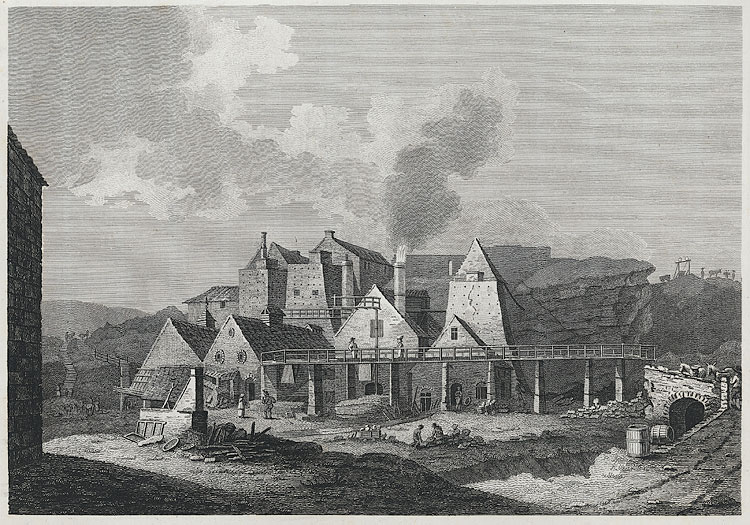
View of the ironworks, 1800

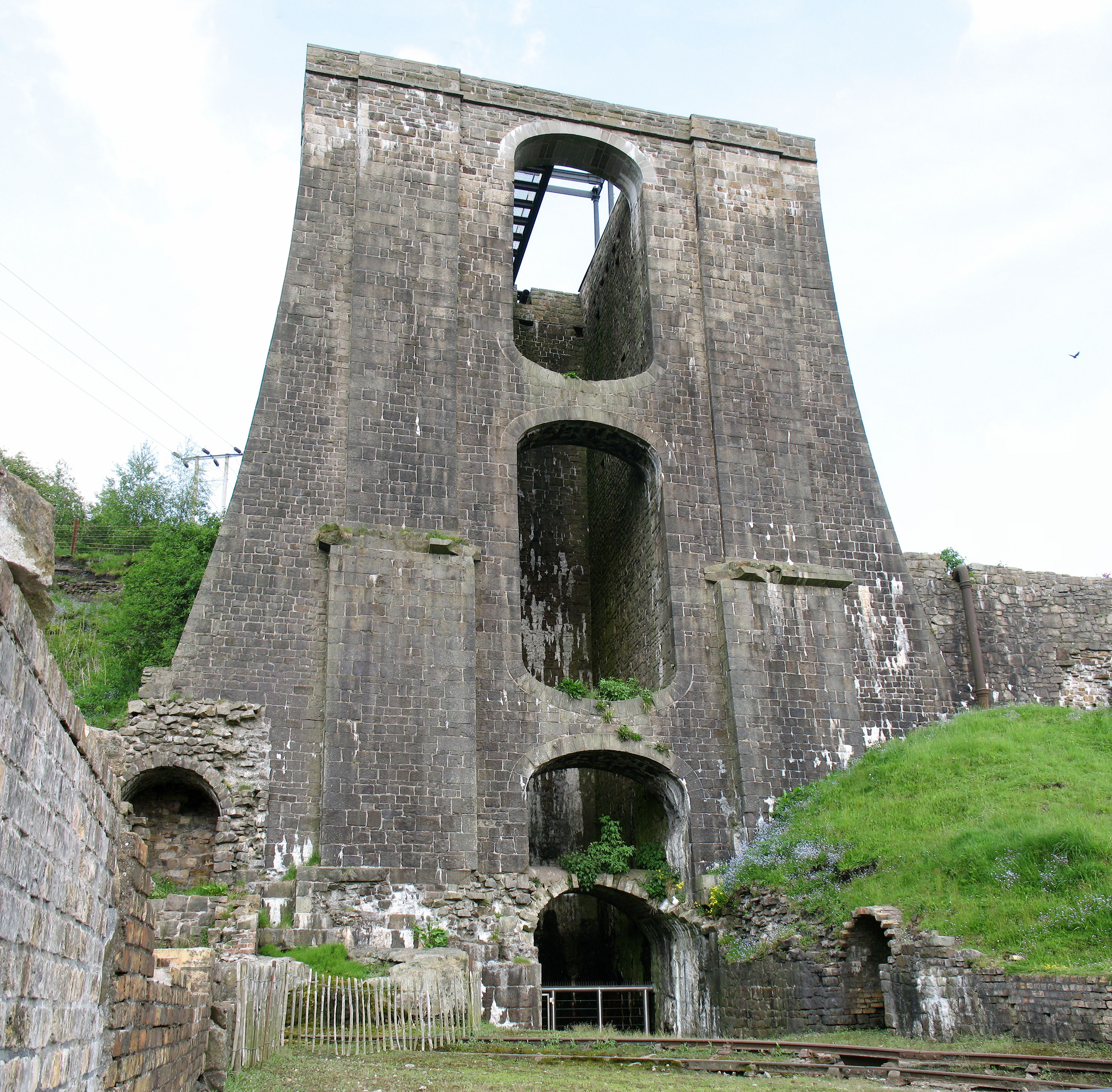
The water balance tower

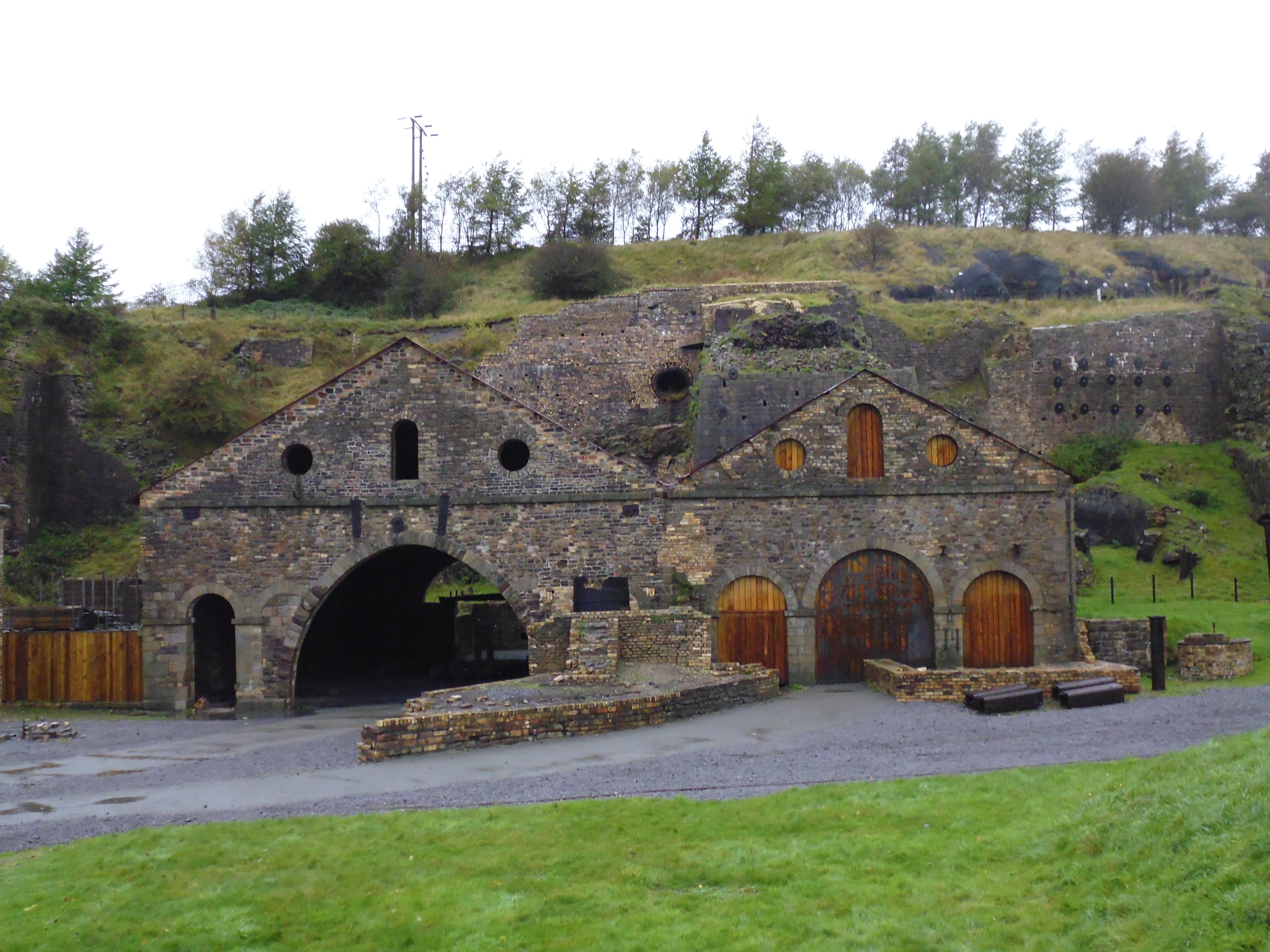
The Cast House

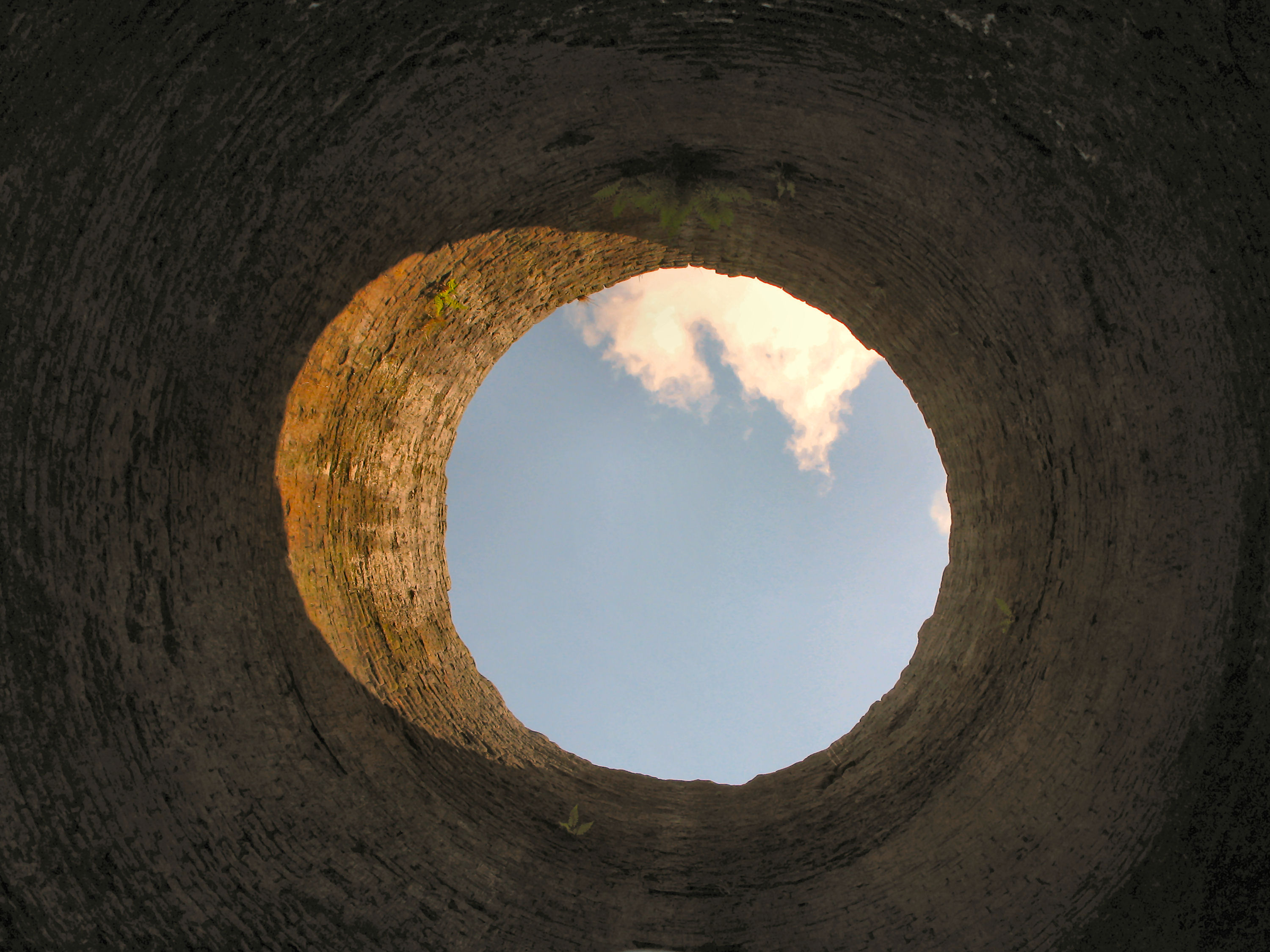
A furnace chimney hole

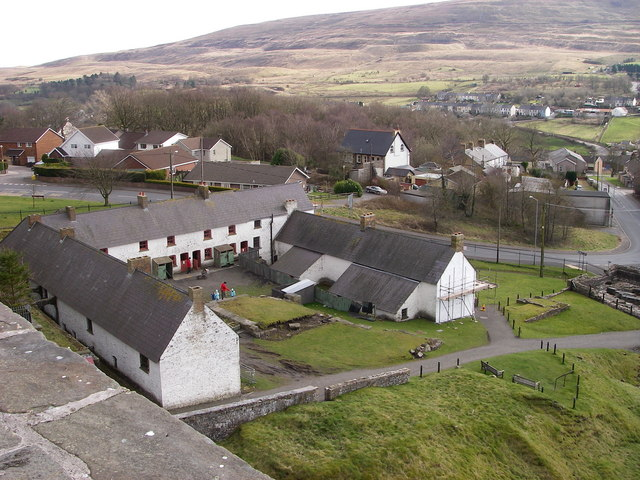
Stack Square

== See also ==
- List of Cadw properties

== Sources ==
- Aslet, Clive (2005). Landmarks of Britain. London, UK: Hodder & Stoughton. ISBN 978-0-340-73510-7.
- Atkinson, Michael; Baber, Colin (1987). The Growth and Decline of the South Wales Iron Industry: 1760–1880. Cardiff: University of Wales Press. ISBN 978-0-708-30953-7. OCLC 1338704747.
- Carr, James C.; Taplin, Walter (1962). History of the British Steel Industry. Cambridge, Mass.: Harvard University Press. OCLC 1067957316.
- Coxe, William (1995) [1801]. An Historical Tour of Monmouthshire: Volume 2. Cardiff: Merton Priory Press. ISBN 978-1-8989-3708-1. OCLC 34476778.
- Evans, J. A. H. (Spring 2000). "Big Pit, Blaenavon - A New Chronology?". Gwent Local History. Gwent Local History Council.
- Elliott, John (2011). "The Iron and Steel Industry". In Williams, Chris; Williams, Sian Rhiannon; Griffiths, Ralph A. (eds.). Industrial Monmouthshire, c.1780–1914. The Gwent County History. Vol. 4. Cardiff: University of Wales Press. ISBN 978-0-708-32365-6. OCLC 837982726.
- Newman, John (2000). Gwent/Monmouthshire. The Buildings of Wales. London: Penguin Books. ISBN 978-0-30009-6309.
- Wakelin, Peter (2006). Blaenavon Ironworks. Cardiff: Cadw. ISBN 1-85760-123-8.
