= Blaenavon =

Town in Wales

Blaenavon: Welsh: Blaenafon
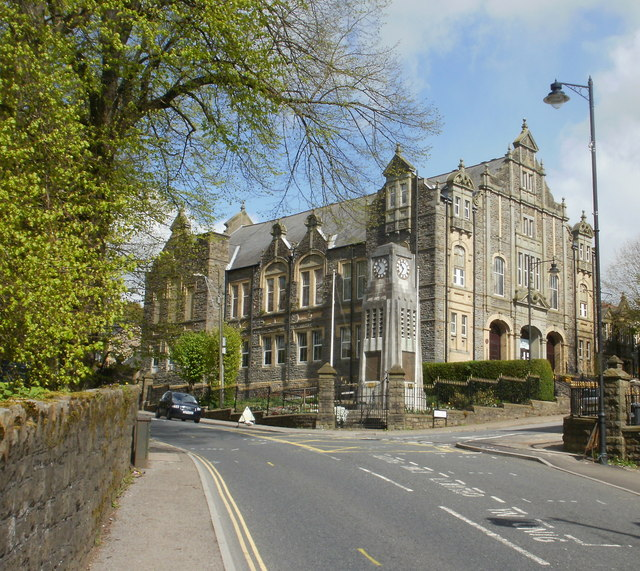
- Blaenavon War Memorial and Workmen's Hall

- Location within Torfaen
- Area: 17.83 km^{2} (6.88 sq mi)
- Population: 6,055 (2011)
  - Density: 340/km^{2} (880/sq mi)
- GSS code: W04000760
- Demonym: Blaenavonite
- OS grid reference: SO 255 095
- Community: Blaenavon
- Principal area: Torfaen
- Preserved county: Gwent
- Country: Wales
- Sovereign state: United Kingdom
- Post town: PONTYPOOL
- Postcode district: NP4
- Dialling code: 01495
- Police: Gwent
- Fire: South Wales
- Ambulance: Welsh
- UK Parliament: Torfaen
- Senedd Cymru – Welsh Parliament: Torfaen
- List of places UK Wales Torfaen 51.7736°N 3.0828°W Map of the community

Blaenavon (Welsh: Blaenafon) is a town and community in Torfaen county borough, Wales, high on a hillside on the source of the Afon Lwyd. It is within the boundaries of the historic county of Monmouthshire and the preserved county of Gwent. The population is 6,055.

Parts of the town and surrounding country form the Blaenavon Industrial Landscape, selected as a World Heritage Site by UNESCO in 2000.

== History ==
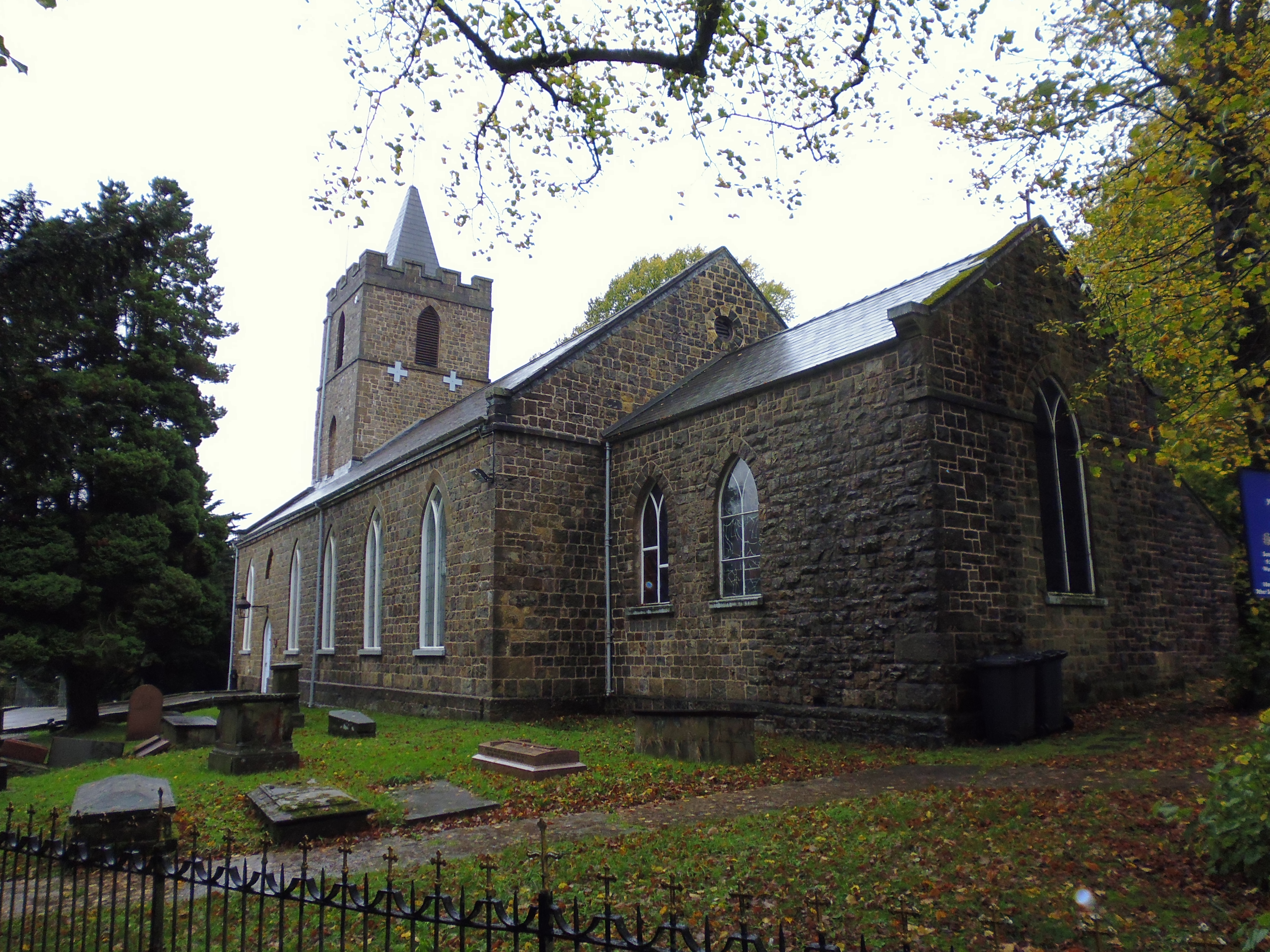
The Church in Wales church of St Peter

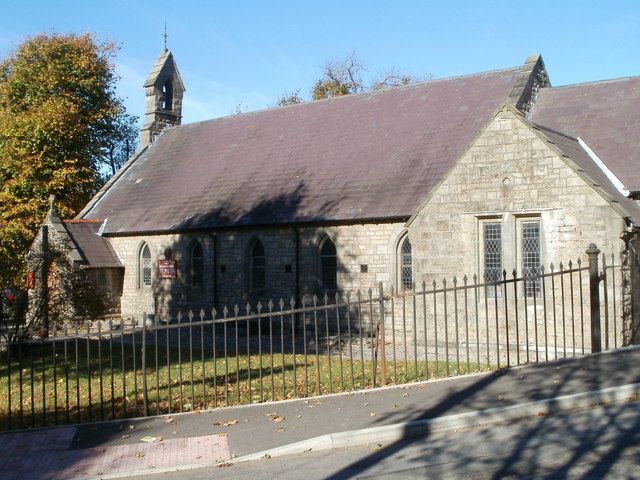
The Church in Wales church of St Paul

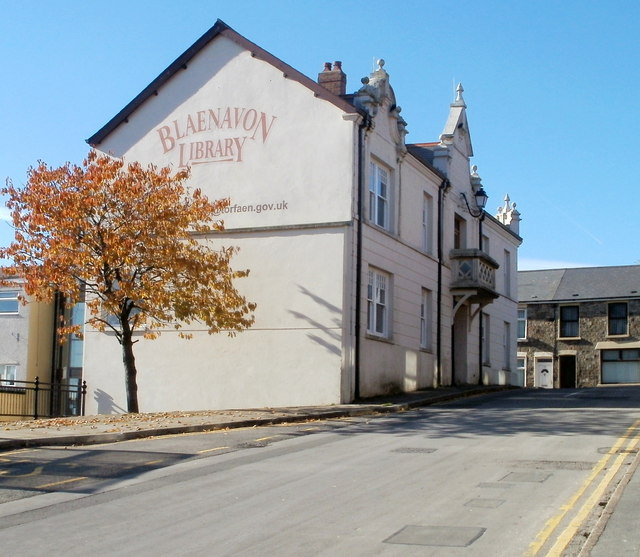
The Former Municipal Offices in Lion Street

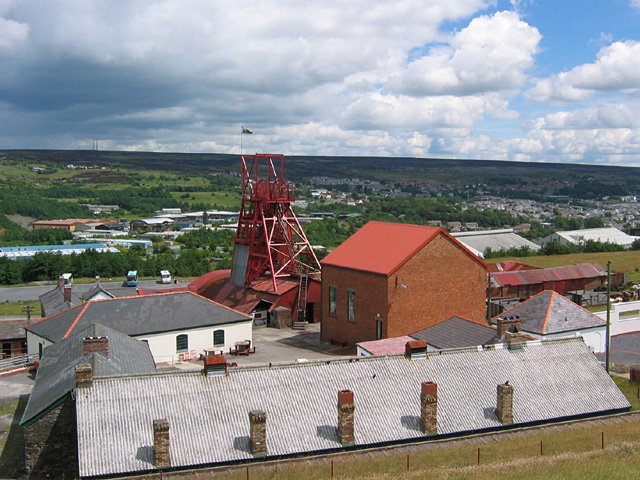
Big Pit National Coal Museum

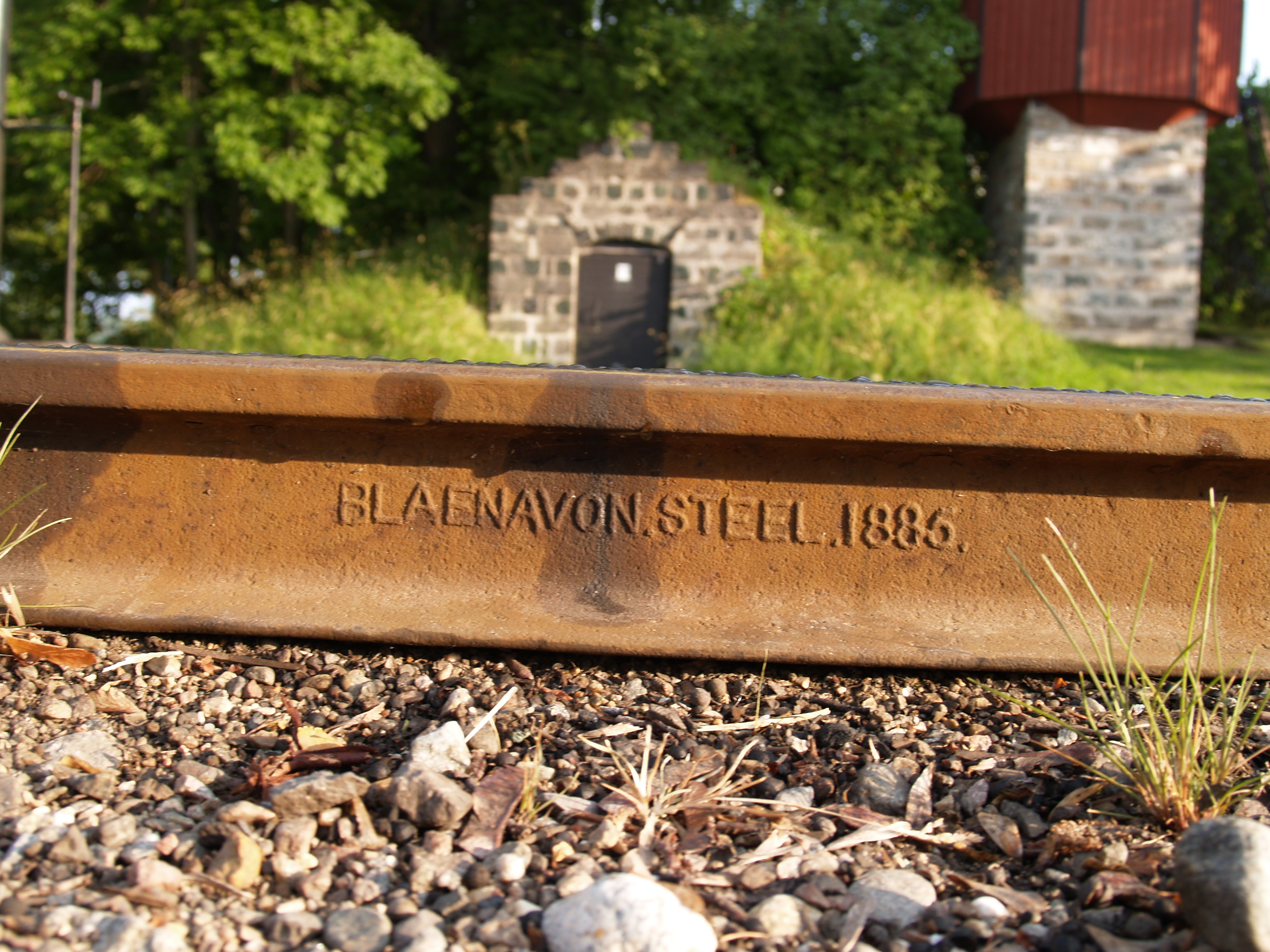
Rail manufactured in Blaenavon, seen in Sweden

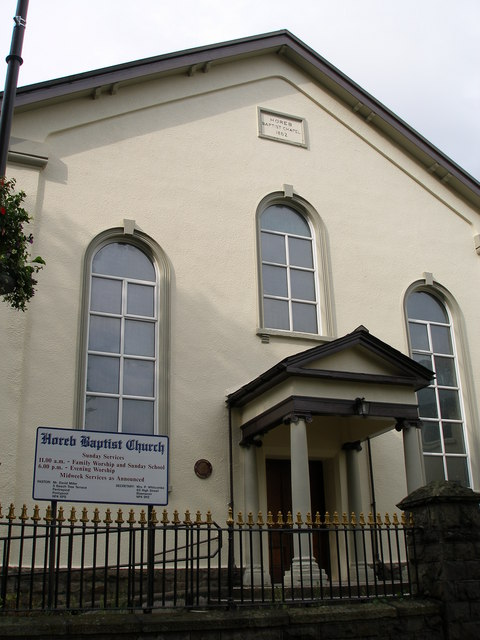
Horeb Baptist church

Blaenavon literally means "head of the river" or loosely "river's source" in the Welsh language. Blaenavon grew around an ironworks opened in 1788 by the West Midlands industrialist Thomas Hill and his partners, Thomas Hopkins and Benjamin Pratt. The businessmen invested £40,000 into the ironworks project and erected three blast furnaces. Hopkins, as a result of operating the Cannock Wood Forge, Staffordshire, was in contact with skilled and experienced ironworkers, and managed to persuade many of them to migrate to Blaenavon to help establish the new ironworks. In 1836 Robert William Kennard formed the Blaenavon Coal and Iron Company, which subsequently bought the Blaenavon Ironworks.

Blaenavon House, a mansion constructed in 1798 by Thomas Hopkins, was repurposed as a hospital in 1924, supported by the subscriptions of local iron and coal workers. In the 1940s the hospital site was given by the then owners of the site, the National Coal Board, to the UK Ministry of Health; it was run as a cottage hospital until 1985. When the hospital closed the building was sold by the local authority and refurbished as a nursing home for the elderly. In 1995 the building was listed as a Grade II listed building. Following the closure of the nursing home in 2007, the building was left empty. It was badly vandalised and stripped of its lead work, slate roof and original interiors, and was placed on the Buildings at Risk register. In 2016 a fire caused severe damage to the ballroom wing and adjoining extension. The House was sold in 2017 to private owners and is currently undergoing restoration as a family home once again.

The Municipal Offices in Lion Street were the home of Blaenavon Urban District Council until local government reorganisation in 1974.

== Governance ==
Blaenavon is a community represented by Blaenavon Town Council and is an electoral ward of Torfaen County Borough Council. Blaenavon is twinned with Coutras in France.

== Geography ==
The town lies near the source of the Afon Lwyd river, north of Cwmbran.

== Demography ==
The population of Blaenavon has declined gradually at each ten-year census since the closure of the ironworks in 1900. It had fallen to 8,451 by 1961 and fell more rapidly after closure of the coal mine in 1980. Part of this decline was not emigration but a decrease in birth rate.

== Economy ==
The Blaenavon Coal and Iron Company developed the Big Pit coalworks with adjoining steel works particularly for rail manufacture. The steel-making and coal mining industries followed, boosting the town's population to over 20,000 at one time before 1890. Since 1988, part of this site has been the Big Pit National Coal Museum.

== Culture and community ==
Government, publishers and mainly Welsh writers sought in 2003 to attract more visitors by introducing Blaenavon as Wales' second "book town" (the first being Hay-on-Wye on the English border). However, the project did not succeed. This can be attributed to a combination of the town's remote location and the established competition from Hay. Many thriving community groups serve and improve the town, including Future Blaenavon, which has helped to create a community garden at the bottom of the town.

== Landmarks ==
Parts of the town and surrounding country form the Blaenavon Industrial Landscape, selected as a World Heritage Site by UNESCO in 2000. Attractions in the town include the Big Pit National Coal Museum (an Anchor Point of the European Route of Industrial Heritage), Blaenavon Ironworks, the Pontypool and Blaenavon Railway and Blaenavon World Heritage Centre. The town has a male voice choir, a town band, and many historical walks through the local mountains.

== Transport ==
A railway viaduct was constructed in 1790; the structure disappeared and was unearthed in a 2001 episode of the archaeology television programme Time Team.

The Pontypool and Blaenavon Railway is a scenic attraction rich in geological and historical interest. This volunteer-run heritage line has heritage steam and diesel services taking passengers from the starting point at Furnace Sidings, down to Big Pit Halt along the branch line, then to the Whistle Inn halt in Garn yr Erw, before heading south towards Coed Avon, next to Blaenavon Cemetery – this is purely a terminus, not a passenger stop. Trains then return northbound via the restored Blaenavon High Level station back to the visitor centre and station at Furnace Sidings.

Blaenavon lost both of its passenger railway stations — Blaenavon High Level station closed in 1941, and the last train from Blaenavon (Low Level) (to Newport via Pontypool Crane Street) ran in April 1962. The lower line had already been closed for more than a year before the Beeching Axe took place. The lower line's passenger service was among many in Gwent (Monmouthshire) which Ministry of Transport de-classified papers reveal were axed because of rail congestion in the Newport area following the newly opened Llanwern steelworks.

There is a National Cycle Route from Blaenavon to Pontypool, largely along the track bed of the former railway line.

There are several local bus services, including services to Brynmawr or Cwmbrân. The most frequent bus route runs to Newport via Varteg, Pontypool and Cwmbrân.

== Education ==
- Blaenavon Heritage VC Primary School & Nursery
- Busy Bees Nursery Following Samuel Hopkins' death in 1815, his sister Sarah Hopkins of Rugeley, who had inherited much money from her late brother, erected Blaenavon Endowed School in his memory. Which has since been permanently closed.

== Religious sites ==
St Peter's Church was constructed in 1804, gifted to the parish by Thomas Hill and Samuel Hopkins.

At the time of the Welsh revival, the town was also served by sixteen non-conformist chapels.

== Sport ==
- Forgeside RFC
- Forgeside AFC
- Blaenavon RFC
- Blaenavon Blues AFC
- Blaenavon Bowls Club Blaenavon Golf Club (now defunct) was founded in 1906. The club closed in 1937.

== Notable people ==
Notable people born in Blaenavon include the Broadway and film actor E. E. Clive, award-winning mystery writer Dorothy Simpson, and international rugby union players Mark Taylor, Ken Jones (also an Olympic athlete), John Perkins, Chris Huish, Terry Cobner and Colin Evans.

Nick Thomas-Symonds, elected MP for Torfaen in 2015, was brought up in the town.

== See also ==
- Mining in Wales
- Communities of Torfaen
- Grade I listed buildings in Torfaen
- Grade II* listed buildings in Torfaen
- Scheduled Monuments in Torfaen
