= Pentrepiod Halt railway station (Monmouthshire) =

Disused railway station in Pentrepiod, Torfaen

Pentrepiod Halt
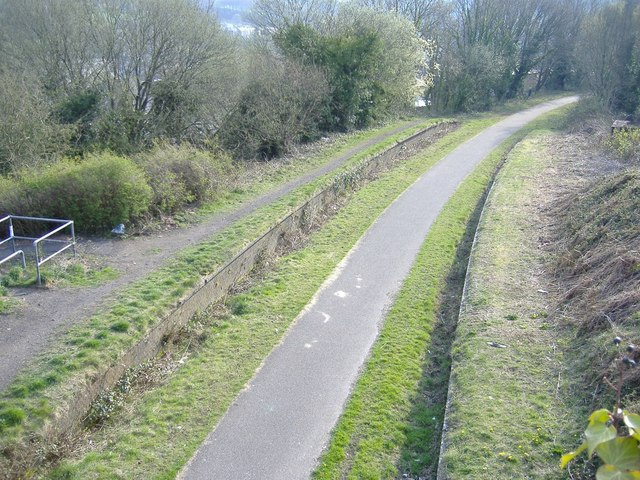
- Abandoned track at Pentrepiod Halt with only the platforms left.

General information
- Location: Torfaen; Wales
- Coordinates: 51.7120°N 3.0623°W

Other information
- Status: Disused

History
- Pre-grouping: London and North Western Railway and Great Western Railway
- Post-grouping: Great Western Railway

Key dates
- 13 July 1912: Station opens
- 5 May 1941: Station closes to passengers
Location

Pentrepiod Halt, Torfaen is a former railway station that was located approximately 2 miles (3.2 km) north of Pontypool in Torfaen.

== History ==
The station was on the Great Western Railway's Newport - Pontypool - Blaenavon - Brynmawr Eastern Valley "Upper Level" line. The line opened to passengers in 1879 but the station at Pentrepiod was not added until 13 July 1912. As passenger services along the entire route were withdrawn on 5 May 1941 (ostensibly due to wartime economies, but they never resumed after hostilities ended), the station had an active life of less than 30 years. The line never generated much passenger traffic as it only served a number of small catchments and had only been opened (originally by the LNWR) as a competitor to the Great Western Railway "Lower Line" which ran from Newport - Blaenavon along the valley floor, the two services sharing the same track from leaving the main line at Llantarnam until they diverged at Trevethin Junction just north of Pontypool Crane Street station.

The "Upper" line, which after Crane Street, called at Waunfelin Halt, Cwmffrwdoer Halt, Pentrepiod Halt, Pentwyn Halt, Abersychan & Talywain, Garndiffaith, Varteg, Blaenavon High Level, Waunavon and Brynmawr had an irregular, but approximately two-hourly service from around 06.00 - 23.00 (1938 timetable).

The "Lower" line had an hourly service and called at Pontnewynydd, Snatchwood Halt, Abersychan Low Level, Cwmffrwd Halt, Cwmavon Halt and Blaenavon Low Level and closed to passengers in 1962. The lower line track was lifted from Blaenavon to Trevethin Junction shortly afterward. However, the line "Upper" line continued to be used until 1980 for the considerable coal traffic from The Big Pit until its closure and a number of passenger specials were organised by rail enthusiasts between 1967 and 1980. The line was double track until 1965 when it was singled following the colliery closures. The track was lifted in summer 1983.

Preceding station	Disused railways	Following station
Cwmffrwdoer Halt	Great Western Railway; Brynmawr and Blaenavon Railway	Pentwyn Halt
