= Garn =

Garn may refer to:

== People ==
- Garn Stephens, American actress and writer for television, 1970s to 1990s
- Jake Garn (born 1932), American politician from Utah, Navy officer and astronaut
- Kevin Garn (born 1955), American politician from Utah
- Stanley Marion Garn (1922–2007), American biologist and educator

== Other uses ==
- Global Alliance for Rights of Nature; see Rights of nature § 20th and 21st century developments
- GARN (company), U.S.-based alternative energy company
- Garn scale, NASA's unit of measure for symptoms resulting from space adaptation syndrome, named after Jake Garn
- Garn-yr-erw, village in Wales

== See also ==
- Le Garn
- Y Garn (disambiguation)
