= Snatchwood Halt railway station =

Former railway station in Wales

Coordinates: 51.7173°N 3.0591°W

Snatchwood Halt

General information
- Location: Snatchwood, Torfaen; Wales

Other information
- Status: Disused

History
- Original company: Great Western Railway
- Post-grouping: Great Western Railway

Key dates
- 13 July 1912: Opened
- 5 October 1953: Closed
Location

Snatchwood Halt railway station served Snatchwood between Pontypool and Abersychan in Torfaen, South Wales, UK. The station was opened by the Great Western Railway in 1912 on the line it had purchased from the Monmouthshire Railway and Canal Company in 1880. The Halt lay between Pontypool Crane Street to the south and Abersychan to the north. The Halt (and the line) lay adjacent to the current A4043 road, between the road and the nearby Afon Lwyd.

== History ==
The Great Western Railway's Eastern Valley "Lower Line" ran from Newport to Blaenavon along the valley floor. By 1 June 1854 the double line was extended from Pontypool Crane Street to Abersychan. The rest of the line from Abersychan to Blaenavon remained single track. The line to Blaenavon was opened for passenger traffic on 1 October 1854. (Note: According to Byles; Barrie says goods 1 June 1854, passengers 2 October 1854, and MacDermot agrees.) Stations were initially provided at Pontnewynydd, Abersychan, Cwmavon and Blaenavon. Three trains per day were run, taking one hour to complete the journey.

The "Lower" line had an hourly service and called at Pontnewynydd, Snatchwood Halt, Abersychan Low Level, Cwmffrwd Halt, Cwmavon Halt and Blaenavon Low Level and closed to passengers in 1962. The lower line track was lifted from Blaenavon to Trevethin Junction shortly afterward. However, the line "Upper" line continued to be used until 1980 for the considerable coal traffic from The Big Pit until its closure and a number of passenger specials were organised by rail enthusiasts between 1967 - 1980.

Preceding station	Disused railways	Following station
Abersychan Low Level; Line and station closed	Great Western Railway; Monmouthshire Railway and Canal Company	Pontnewynydd; Line and station closed
