= Garn-yr-Erw railway station =

Disused railway station in Garn-yr-erw, Torfaen

Garn-yr-Erw

General information
- Location: Garn-yr-erw, Torfaen; Wales
- Coordinates: 51.7839°N 3.1197°W
- Grid reference: SO228100

Other information
- Status: Disused

History
- Original company: London and North Western Railway
- Pre-grouping: London and North Western Railway
- Post-grouping: London, Midland and Scottish Railway

Key dates
- 1 February 1913: Opened
- 5 May 1941: Closed
Location

Garn-yr-Erw railway station served the village of Garn-yr-erw, in the historical county of Monmouthshire, Wales, from 1913 to 1941 on the Pontypool and Blaenavon Railway.

== History ==
The station was opened on 1 February 1913 by the London and North Western Railway. It was known as Garn-yr-Erw Halt in the handbook of stations. It closed on 5 May 1941, when passenger services on the line were withdrawn.

Preceding station	Disused railways	Following station
Waenavon; Line and station closed	London and North Western Railway; Pontypool and Blaenavon Railway	Whistle Inn Halt; Line and station closed
