= Waenavon railway station =

Former railway station in Wales

Waenavon
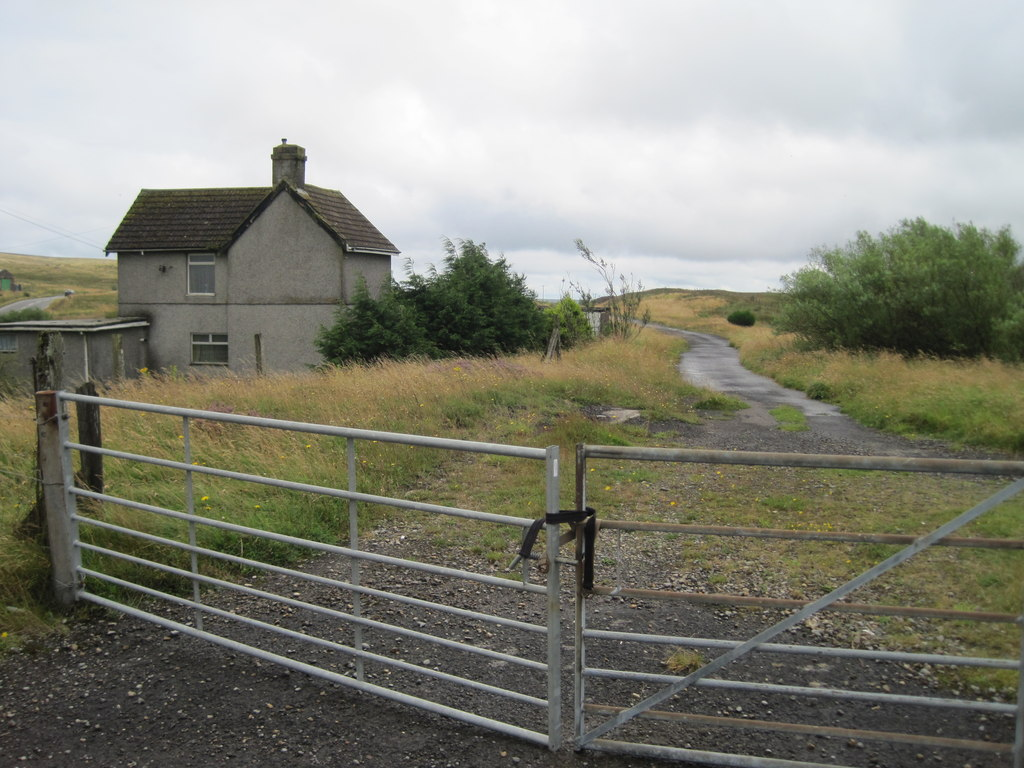
- Station site in August 2012.

General information
- Location: Waen Wen, Clydach Gorge, Torfaen; Wales
- Coordinates: 51.7924°N 3.1348°W
- Grid reference: SO218110
- Platforms: 1

Other information
- Status: Disused

History
- Original company: Brynmawr and Blaenavon Railway
- Pre-grouping: London and North Western Railway
- Post-grouping: London, Midland and Scottish Railway

Key dates
- 1 September 1871: Opened
- 5 May 1941: Closed to passengers
- 23 June 1954: Closed to goods traffic
Location

Waenavon railway station, also known as Waen Avon, was a station on the Brynmawr and Blaenavon Railway in South East Wales. To the south of the station a short line served Milfraen Colliery.

At an altitude of 1,392 feet (424 m) above sea level, Waenavon was the highest railway station on a standard gauge line in Wales. It was the highest on the London, Midland and Scottish Railway following the closure of Leadhills in 1939.

== History ==
The Brynmawr and Blaenavon Railway constructed a 4 miles 6 furlongs (7.6 km) line to Blaenavon High Level which opened to goods traffic on 1 November 1869 and to passengers on 1 January 1870. An extension to Pontypool Crane Street opened in September 1879. The line was leased to the London and North Western Railway to transport coal to the Midlands via the Heads of the Valleys line. Waenavon station opened on 1 September 1871.

From the turn of the 20th century, the line served mining activity centred on several pits and collieries. The branch served several collieries between Brynmawr and Waen Avon. The first of these was the Waen Nantyglo Colliery, which was situated a little east of a tramway which later carried the B4248 Brynmawr to Blaenavon Road. The connection was removed by 1925. As Waenavon was approached on a facing branch to the left was built, leading to Clydach colliery, but these had gone by 1915, to be replaced by New Clydach Colliery sidings. Vestiges of these remained until 1950. Some 300 metres (980 ft) south of Waenavon station a gated siding, laid in 1870, veered to the west to serve Milfraen Colliery. The space between the single platform station at Waenavon and the branch was occupied by a series of loops and sidings.

By 1931, Milfraen Colliery had ceased production having exhausted its coal reserves and the branch line that served it was lifted in 1937. After the Depression and unemployment of the 1930s, passenger services were withdrawn from the station and the line on 5 May 1941 due to the exigencies of the Second World War. Blaenavon shed closed on 5 September 1942 and eventually goods services also ceased on 23 June 1954. The line was retained for wagon storage until 1953, and around 1950, a temporary siding was laid in connection with opencast workings on the Blorenge, branching east roughly at the point where the Milfraen Colliery branch had previously diverged west.

In 1972, a section of the line from Abersychan and Talywain to Waenavon was relaid by the National Coal Board for opencast mine workings. Coal traffic from Blaenavon continued until 8 October 1979 and the pit was closed in 1980 but the track remained down due to the prospect of its sale. A section from Big Pit, Blaenavon was subsequently sold to the Pontypool and Blaenavon Railway.

Preceding station	Disused railways	Following station
Brynmawr; Line and station closed	London and North Western Railway; Brynmawr and Blaenavon Railway	Garn-Yr-Erw Halt; Line and station closed

== Present and future ==
The track from Brynmawr was lifted in July 1961 and the platforms were demolished. The station building still survives to this day and has now become a private residence known as 'Station House'.

Reopening the station to the public has become one of the long-term aims of the Pontypool and Blaenavon Railway. With the extensions to Blaenavon High Level and Big Pit Halt now open, the railway has turned towards extending the line northwards, under a small road bridge and along the still intact track bed to Waenavon, the summit of the line.

There is also growing political interest for the line to extend further again to Brynmawr which would take the railway over the local authority boundary from Torfaen into Blaenau Gwent and also the historic county boundary from Monmouthshire into Brecknockshire. However, the emphasis with the local authority is that this reopening will serve as a community link, rather than a tourist attraction.
