= Pentwyn Halt railway station =

Disused railway station in Pentwyn, Torfaen

Pentwyn Halt
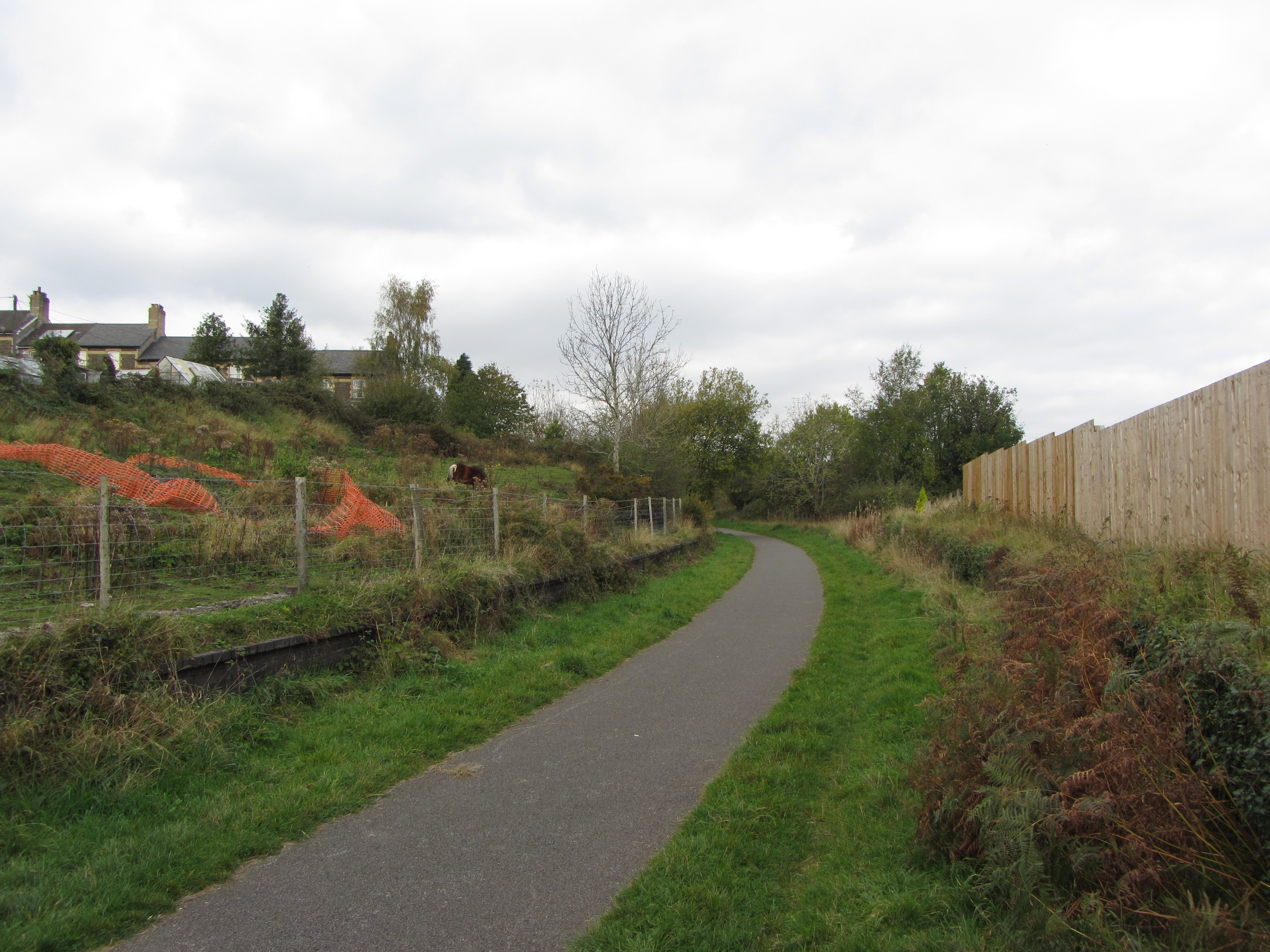
- Site of former Pentwyn Halt station in 2011

General information
- Location: Pentwyn, Monmouthshire; Wales
- Coordinates: 51.7221°N 3.063°W
- Grid reference: SO266031
- Platforms: 2

Other information
- Status: Disused

History
- Original company: Great Western Railway
- Pre-grouping: Great Western Railway
- Post-grouping: Great Western Railway

Key dates
- 13 July 1912: Opened
- 5 May 1941: Closed
Location

Pentwyn Halt railway station served the village of Pentwyn, in the historical county of Monmouthshire, Wales, from 1912 to 1941 on the Pontypool and Blaenavon Railway.

== History ==
The station was opened on 13 July 1912 by the Great Western Railway. It closed on 5 May 1941.

Preceding station	Disused railways	Following station
Abersychan and Talywain; Line and station closed	Great Western Railway; Pontypool and Blaenavon Railway	Pentrepiod Halt; Line and station closed
