= Cwmffrwdoer Halt railway station =

Disused railway station in Pontnewynydd, Torfaen

Cwmffrwdoer Halt

General information
- Location: Pontnewynydd, Monmouthshire; Wales
- Coordinates: 51.7069°N 3.0706°W
- Grid reference: SO261014
- Platforms: 2

Other information
- Status: Disused

History
- Original company: London and North Western Railway and Great Western Railway
- Pre-grouping: London and North Western Railway and Great Western Railway
- Post-grouping: Great Western Railway

Key dates
- 13 July 1912: Opened
- 5 May 1941: Closed
Location

Cwmffrwdoer Halt railway station served the suburb of Pontnewynydd, in the historical county of Monmouthshire, Wales, from 1912 to 1941 on the Pontypool and Blaenavon Railway.

== History ==
The station was opened on 13 July 1912 by the London and North Western Railway and the Great Western Railway. It closed on 5 May 1941.

Preceding station	Disused railways	Following station
Pentrepiod Halt; Line and station closed	London and North Western Railway; Great Western Railway; Pontypool and Blaenavon Railway	Wainfelin Halt; Line and station closed
