= Blaenavon railway station =

Blaenavon railway station may refer to:

- Blaenavon High Level railway station, now on the preserved Pontypool and Blaenavon Railway
- Blaenavon Low Level railway station, now closed
