= Varteg railway station =

Former railway station in Wales

Coordinates: 51.74786°N 3.06605°W

Varteg

General information
- Location: Varteg, Torfaen; Wales
- Grid reference: SO267061
- Line: Brynmawr and Blaenavon Railway
- Platforms: 1

Other information
- Status: Disused

History
- Original company: London and North Western Railway
- Pre-grouping: London and North Western Railway
- Post-grouping: London, Midland and Scottish Railway

Key dates
- 1 May 1878: Opened as Varteg
- 1933: Renamed Varteg Halt
- 5 May 1941: Closed
Location

Varteg railway station was a railway station which served the village of Varteg, in the county of Monmouthshire, on the Brynmawr and Blaenavon Railway. Built by the London and North Western Railway (LNWR) as an expansion to meet the Great Western Railway (GWR) at Abersychan and Talywain. It was sometimes referred to on old Ordnance Survey and British Railway Clearing House (RCH) as 'Varteg Halt', despite it having an extensive station building.

== History ==
Opened by the Brynmawr and Blaenavon Railway, it became part of the London and North Western Railway which through the connection with the Heads of the Valleys Line was able to take coal directly to destinations in the Midlands. The station closed in 1941 in the same year when passenger trains operated by the Great Western Railway ceased due to the exigencies of the Second World War.

== The station site today ==
Although the line through the station site can still be traced on an OS map nearby Shop Road Bridge there is little left to show as the disused station building was later demolished by British Rail. Today, the line through the site is occupied by the National Cycle Route 46.

Reopening the station to the public has become one of the long-term ambitions of the heritage Pontypool and Blaenavon Railway, whom aim to reconstruct the station as part of the expansion plans.

Preceding station	Disused railways	Following station
Blaenavon High Level	Brynmawr and Blaenavon Railway	Garndiffaith
