= Whistle Inn Halt railway station =

Train station in Wales

Whistle Inn Halt
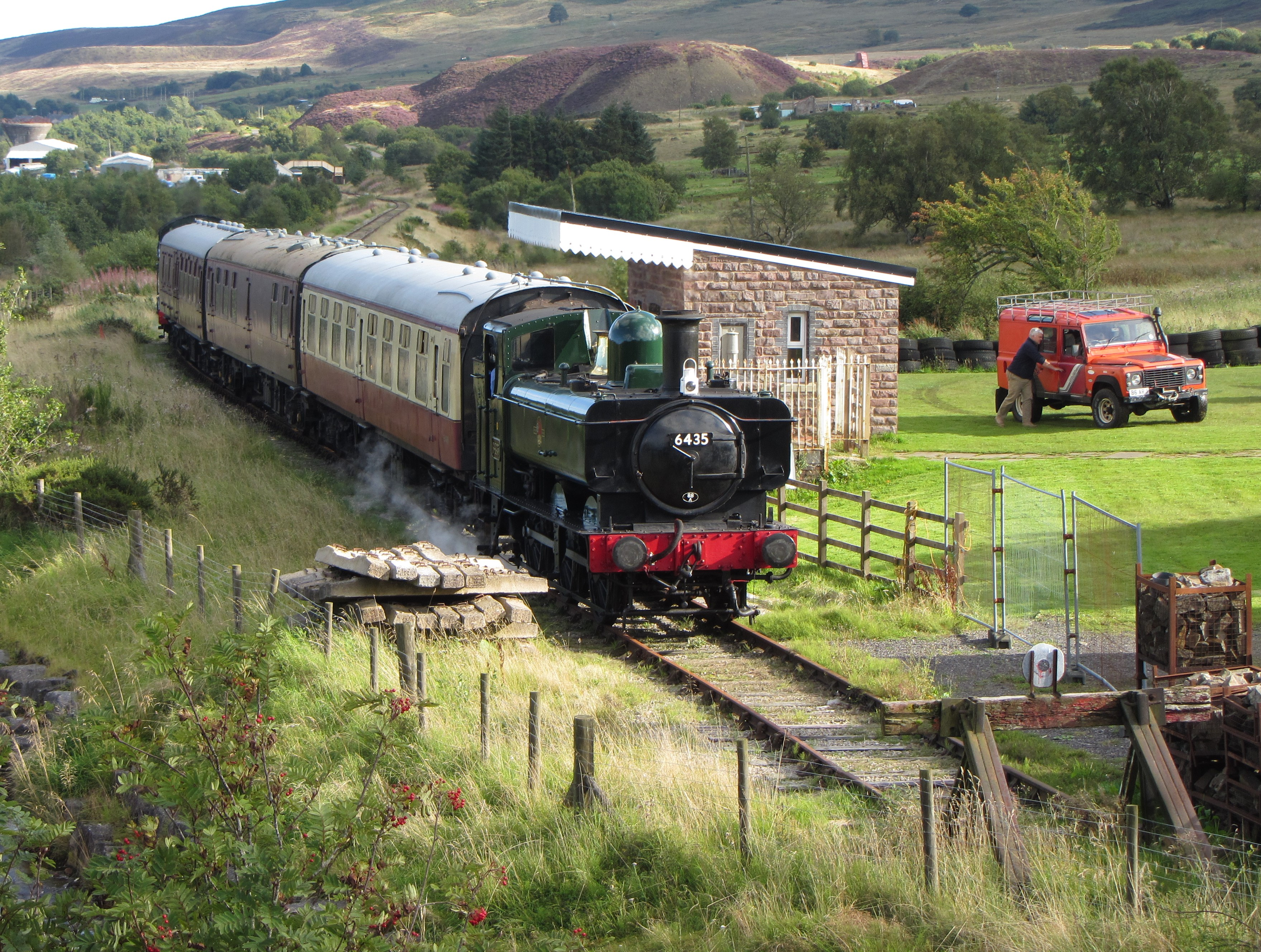
- GWR 6400 Class 6435 at Whistle Inn Halt

General information
- Location: Garn-yr-erw, Torfaen; Wales
- Coordinates: 51.7838°N 3.1182°W
- Grid reference: SO229100
- System: Station on heritage railway
- Operator: Pontypool and Blaenavon Railway
- Platforms: 1

Key dates
- 30 April 1988: Opened
Location

Whistle Inn is a halt on the Pontypool and Blaenavon Railway heritage railway in Torfaen, Wales. It is situated adjacent to the Whistle Inn, near the village of Garn-yr-erw. The station is the northern terminus of the line and its highest point at 1,307 feet (398 m) above sea level. To the north of the halt, on the other side of the road bridge over the line, was Garn-Yr-Erw Halt on the Brynmawr and Blaenavon Railway.

== History ==
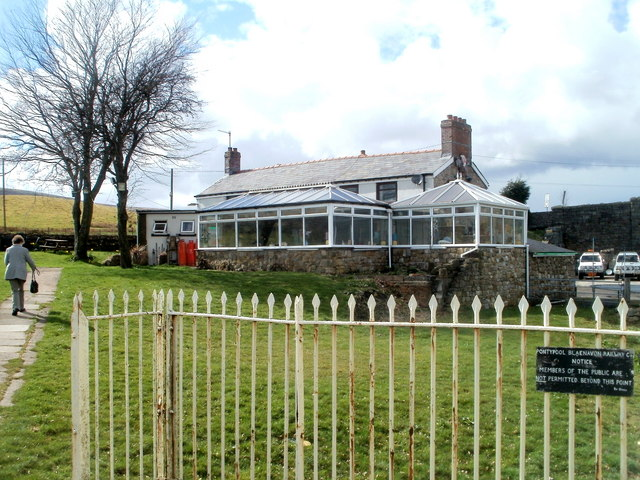
Whistle Inn

The station is situated on the trackbed of the London and North Western Railway's Brynmawr and Blaenavon Railway which closed to passengers on 5 May 1941 and to goods on 23 June 1954. In September 1971, a section of the line between Waenavon and Blaenavon Furnace Sidings was relaid by the National Coal Board for opencast mine workings. The relaid section came into use in March 1972 and carried approximately 1000 tons of coal per day until June 1975 when the mine workings ceased and the line was clipped out of use on 18 August. The Private Siding Agreement concluded by the Coal Board for the reinstatement of the section was not terminated until 30 April 1980, after which the track was removed. A section from Cwmbran to Big Pit, Blaenavon was subsequently sold to the Pontypool and Blaenavon Railway.

Steam workings on the Pontypool and Blaenavon commenced on 11 August 1984 and a station was opened at Whistle Inn on 30 April 1988. Just beyond the station to the north was Garn-yr-erw Halt. Whistle Inn, which takes its name from the adjacent public house, is the line's northern terminus and its highest point at 1,307 feet (398 m) above sea level.

Preceding station	Heritage railways	Following station
Terminus	Pontypool & Blaenavon Railway	Furnace Sidings towards Big Pit Halt or Blaenavon High Level
