= Big Pit National Coal Museum =

Former mine and industrial heritage museum

- Pwll Mawr Amgueddfa Lofaol Cymru
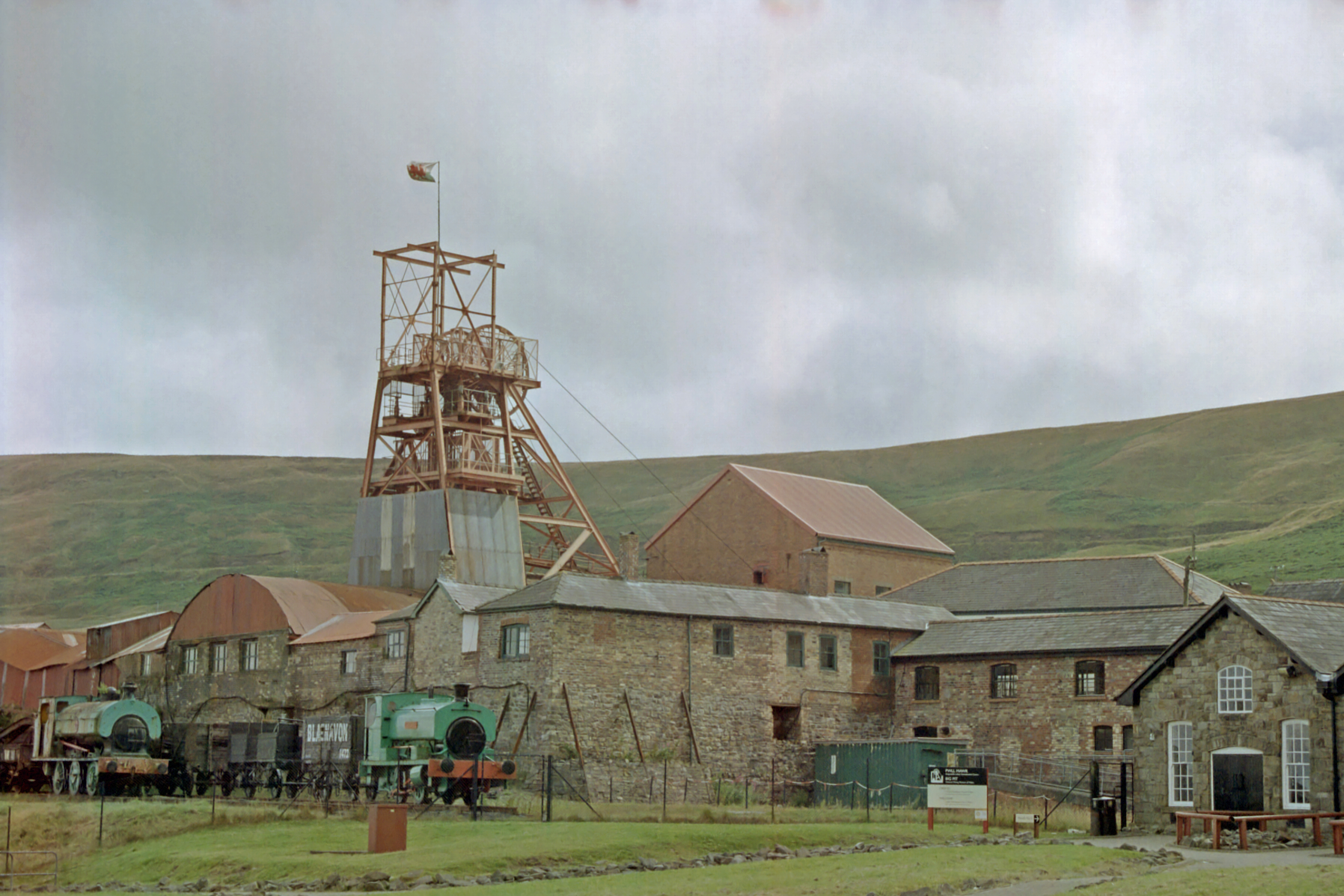
- View of museum with the winding tower.
- Established: 1983
- Location: Blaenavon, Wales
- Coordinates: 51.7724°N 3.1050°W
- Visitors: 129,396 (Fiscal year 2019)
- Website: www.museum.wales/bigpit/

UNESCO World Heritage Site
- Part of: Blaenavon Industrial Landscape
- Criteria: Cultural: (iii), (iv)
- Reference: 984

Big Pit National Coal Museum (Welsh: Pwll Mawr Amgueddfa Lofaol Cymru) is an industrial heritage museum in Blaenavon, Torfaen, Wales. A working coal mine from 1880 to 1980, it was opened to the public in 1983 as a charitable trust called the Big Pit (Blaenavon) Trust. By 1 February 2001 Big Pit Coal Museum was incorporated into the National Museums and Galleries of Wales as the National Mining Museum of Wales. The site is dedicated to operational preservation of the Welsh heritage of coal mining, which took place during the Industrial Revolution.

Located adjacent to the preserved Pontypool and Blaenavon Railway, Big Pit is part of the Blaenavon Industrial Landscape, a World Heritage Site, and an Anchor Point of the European Route of Industrial Heritage.

== History of the working pit: 1860-1980 ==
Big Pit was originally an iron mine, driven into the side of the mountain not far from the surface due to the shallow iron deposits, the level is called Engine Pit Level and can still be seen on the bridge connecting Blaenavon and Garn Rd at 51.7724°N 3.1050°W. The Iron Workings are above the Big Pit coal workings, for some time Engine Pit Level was used as an emergency exit for Big Pit whilst it was working, now the River Arch Level is the escape route. Engine Pit Level was driven around 1810 by hand due to dynamite being invented 5 decades later, there are no known records of the iron mine. There are a few pictures online showing the interior of the Engine Level from the 1960s when miners from Big Pit explored the level, finding an old flange-less wheeled dram inside, now at a museum. There was also a known Iron Workings shaft, Engine Pit Shaft which existed, information and location of this shaft can be on Industrial Gwent.

Big Pit is part of a network of coal workings established in Blaenavon in the first half of the nineteenth century by the Blaenavon Iron and Coal Company as part of the development of the Blaenavon Ironworks, (Note: The earlier mines supplied iron ore for the many ironworks in the area. Coal was mined here at the time for local demand. It was not until the latter part of the 19th century that there was a great demand for coal.) which means it has some of the oldest large scale industrial coal mining developments in the South Wales Coalfield. The mine was the most important of all the collieries located in Blaenavon.

The nearby Coity Pit is shown in reports in the 1850s, consisting of two shafts 9 feet (2.7 m) in diameter which were difficult to pump out. Historians disagree about when the Big Pit was first in consistent operation, but it may have been a development of a former pit called Kearsley's Pit mentioned in the company records from the 1860s, which lay at the other end of a geological fault from the Coity pits. (Note: This was a consolidation of many smaller mines:Coity Pits, Dodd'e Slope, Coity Level, Blaenavon New Mine, Elled Drift, Forge Pit, Forge Slope and Forge Level. Forge Level was the oldest portion of the mine; activity began there in 1812.)

A mines inspector report of 1881 is the first to describe a mine called the Big Pit due to its elliptical shape with dimensions of 18 feet (5.5 m) by 13 feet (4.0 m), the first shaft in Wales large enough to allow two tramways. On completion it became the coal-winding shaft, while the older Coity shaft was used for upcast air ventilation.

In 1878, the main shaft was deepened to reach the Old Coal seam at 293 feet (89 m). By 1908, Big Pit provided employment for 1,122 people, and by 1923 at peak, there were 1,400 men employed, producing: House Coal, Steam Coal, Ironstone and Fireclay; from the Horn, No. 2 Yard, Old Coal and Elled seams. The peak of production was more than 250,000 tons of coal per year. During the height of production, coal from Big Pit was shipped as far as South America, and also to other points worldwide. Until 1908, when a conveyor became part of the mine equipment, everything at Big Pit was done by manpower – including cutting the coal. The mine was one of the first to install electricity and by 1910, fans, hauling systems and pumps were electric powered.

In 1939, pithead baths were installed at the mine; it meant miners no longer needed to walk home dirty and wet, risking illness. The baths were also beneficial to miners' families; women no longer needed to carry hot jugs of water to fill tin baths and children were no longer accidentally scalded during this process. (Note: Today the miners' baths building houses exhibits and a cafe.) During the Second World War, surface extraction of coal began at Blaenavon in November 1941 using equipment and skilled men from the Canadian Army. On nationalisation in 1947, the National Coal Board took over the mine from the Blaenavon Co. Ltd, which employed 789 men.

By 1970 the workforce numbered only 494, as operations had focused solely on the Garw seam, with a maximum thickness of only 30 inches (760 mm). The NCB agreed the development of a drift mine, which by 1973 meant that windings at Big Pit had ceased, with coal extracted close to the refurbished Black Lion coal washery. The Coity shaft was abandoned, with the Big Pit shaft used for upcast air ventilation and emergency extraction.

The pit finally closed on 2 February 1980 with a loss of more than 250 jobs; it was one of the last working coal mines in Blaenavon, leaving only Blaentillery No.2 Drift Mine, closing in 2010 and the Johnson Mine, closing in 2013.

=== Transport ===
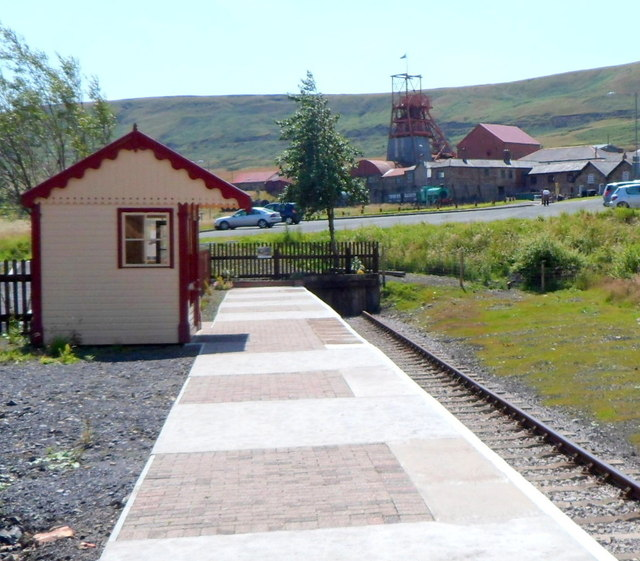
Big Pit Halt railway station with the museum in the background

In 1866, the Brynmawr and Blaenavon Railway opened, with access sidings to the mine workings. The line was immediately leased to the London and North Western Railway, allowing coal to be transported directly to the Midlands via the Merthyr, Tredegar and Abergavenny Railway. By 1880, the line had extended south to meet the Great Western Railway at Abersychan & Talywain. Here the line carried on down the valley through Pontypool Crane Street Railway Station to the coast at Newport, and hence to overseas markets via Newport Docks. In 1922 the LNWR was grouped into the London, Midland and Scottish Railway. From World War II onwards, the line saw a variety of GWR locomotives operating from pit to port, with the line losing its passenger operations from 1941. After other pits in the area had closed, the line connection north was closed as a result of the Beeching cuts from 1964 onwards. The NCB paid for the line to be re-extended to Waunavon in the early 1970s, where the drift mine developments accessed the refurbished former Black Lion coal washery.

Big Pit Halt which is on the heritage Pontypool and Blaenavon Railway line, adjacent to the museum, officially opened on 6 April 2012, however the line to Big Pit actually opened on Friday 16 September 2011. The line and station opened specifically for tourists visiting the museum.

=== Disasters ===
Between 1857 and 1880, more than 60 deaths were recorded by mine inspectors in the Blaenavon coal and ironworks, although these may not have been in the Big Pit itself. From 1880, there are regular reports of accidents at the Big Pit, often resulting in loss of life. In 1891 a boy called Thomas Oliver Jones was crushed to death in a roof fall. In 1894 and 1896 two further miners lost their lives in fatal accidents. On 11 December 1908 three men were killed in an explosion. A coroner's court found that the explosion had been caused by a naked light held by one of the miners. On 7 April 1913, another three men lost their lives in a localised fire that included a fireman, the face manager, and the under manager.

== Tourist attraction: 1983 to present ==
=== National Coal Museum ===
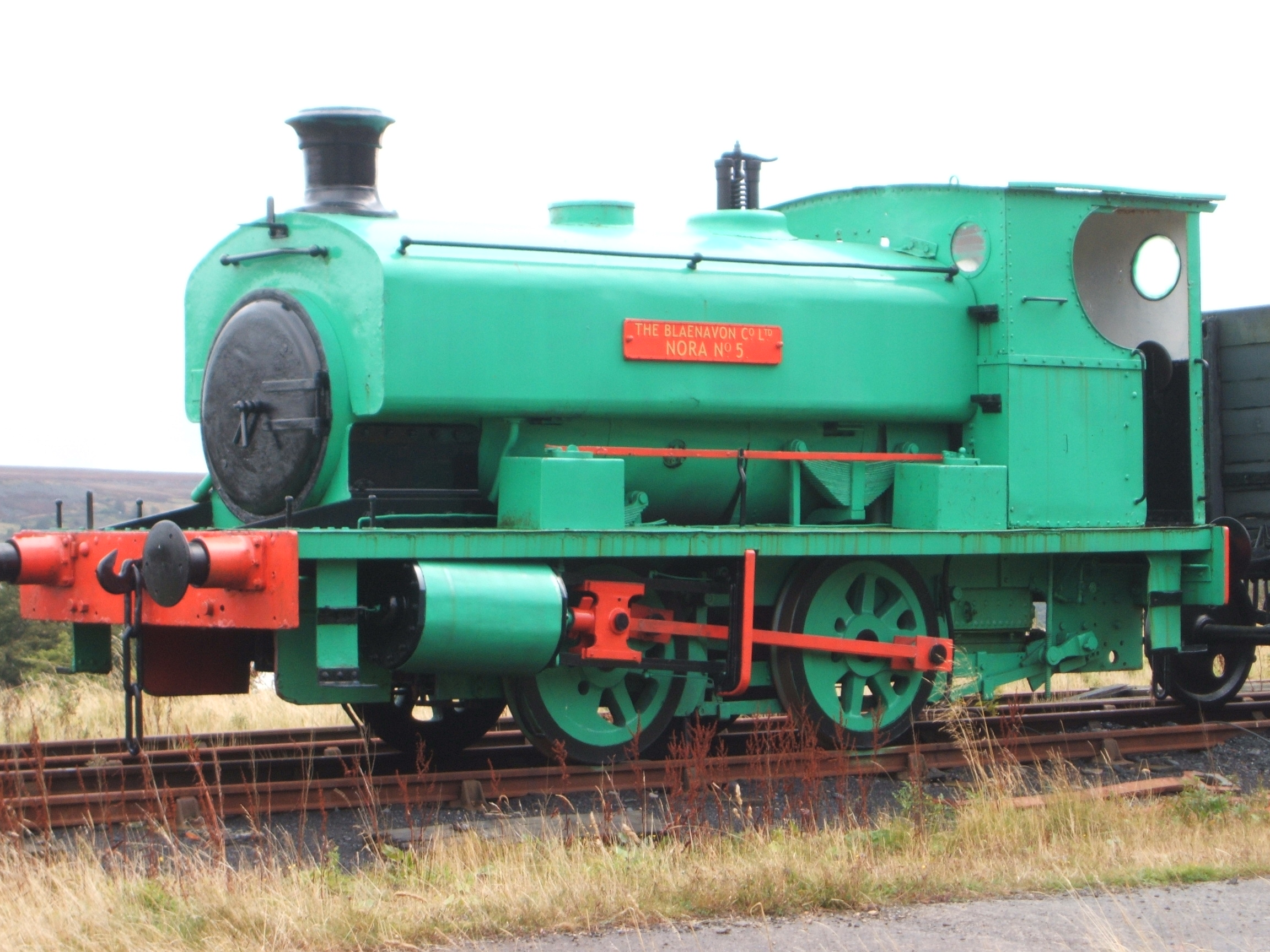
Preserved Andrew Barclay Sons & Co. locomotive Nora No.5 at Big Pit

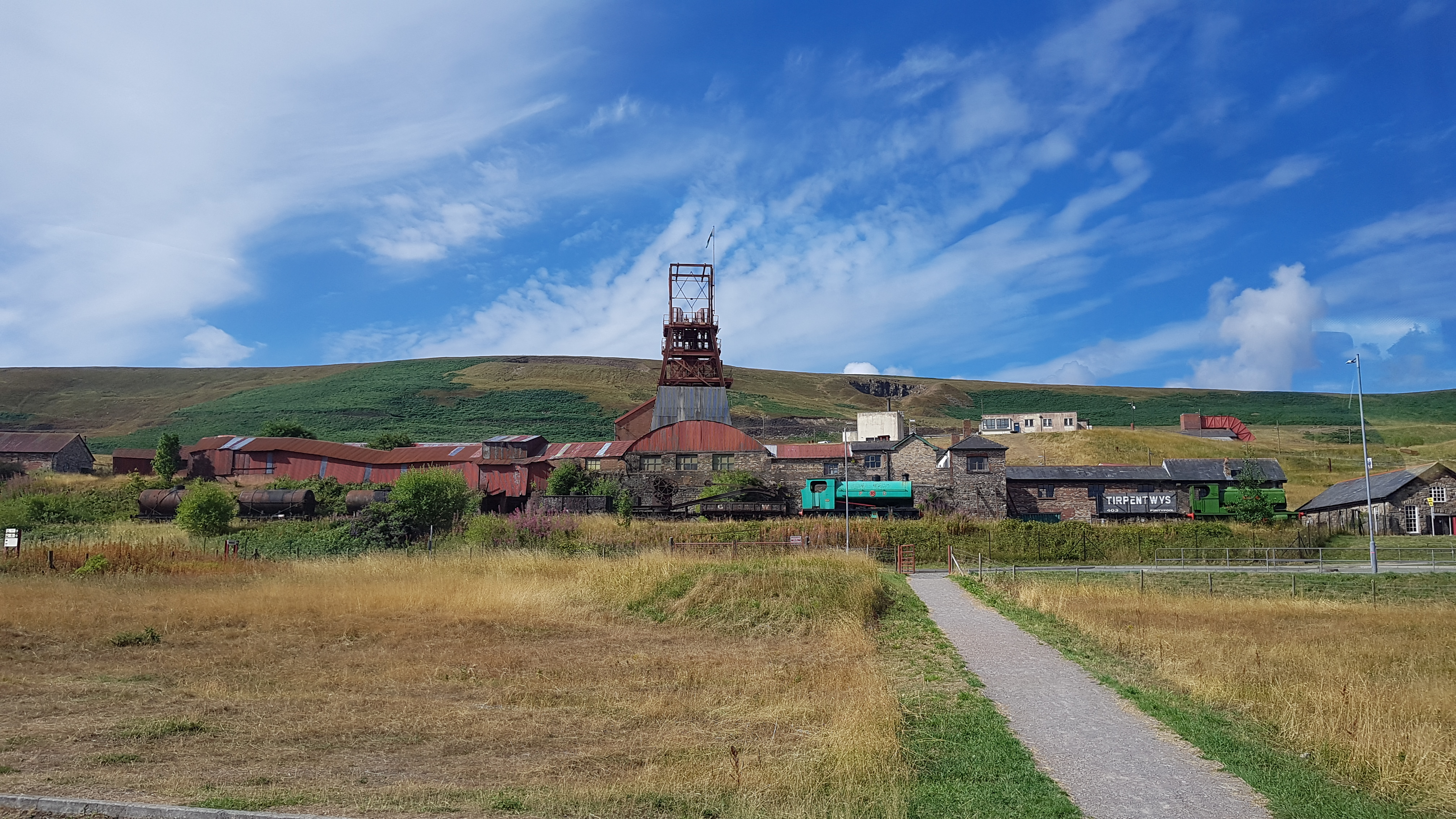
Area of the former Coal Mine

For some years before closure, the mine had been identified as being a possible heritage attraction and a working group was set up made up of the National Coal Board, local government, the National Museum, the Welsh Development Agency and the Welsh Office. Soon after the pit closed, Torfaen Borough Council bought the site for £1 and it was given to a charitable trust called the Big Pit (Blaenavon) Trust to manage the conversion to a heritage museum. The initial development cost £1.5 million with funding from the Welsh Tourist Board, the European Regional Development Fund, the borough council and Gwent County Council. The mine reopened for visitors in 1983 and created 71 jobs. On 1 February 2001, the museum was incorporated into the National Museum Wales; it was initially known as the "National Mining Museum of Wales", but is now called "Big Pit: National Coal Museum".

=== Visitor numbers ===
Visitor numbers were initially lower than expected, which threatened the long-term viability of the museum. In 1983, fewer than 100,000 visitors came to the site and the numbers reached a peak of 120,000 in 1992. Subsequently, the visitor numbers reduced significantly to less than 90,000 in 1998.

The project plan for the museum had suggested that 100,000 visitors were needed per year in the first five years. By 2000, it was clear that this target was not being achieved and that the £5.75 adult entry fee was not covering costs. A substantial Heritage Lottery Fund grant of more than £5 million was awarded in January 2000 which paid for a significant upgrade of the visitor facilities. Since becoming part of the NMW, the numbers of visitors has increased significantly, with more than 140,000 visiting in 2014/15, and 150,176 visitors in 2017.

=== Recognition ===
In 2000, the Blaenavon industrial area, including Big Pit National Coal Museum, was named a World Heritage Site by UNESCO. This was in recognition of the town's importance to the Industrial Revolution. In 2005, the museum won the Gulbenkian Prize, now known as Museum of the Year.

=== Site, safety and staffing ===
Intentionally preserved as an operational attraction, the site was redeveloped in 2003, with design work from TACP/Brooke Millar Partnership. The pit props and steel bands are not for show, but to hold up the mine roof. The water flowing down the tunnel towards the cages is authentic, apart from the fact that it now flows down a channel rather than over the miners' feet. The museum features a range of above ground attractions including a winding house, saw mill, pithead, baths. Visitors are also taken below ground to the pit bottom where they tour the mine workings.

A number of buildings at the site have protected status. The Powder House, Saw mill Office and the Electrical Workshop, were each given Grade II listed building status on 2 September 1995. The Pit Head Building, Headframe & Tram Circuit and the Miners' Bathhouse were both given Grade II* listed building status, also on 2 September 1995. The Powder House building was used to store explosives needed for mine work during the time Big Pit was an active mine.

The mine is covered by HM Inspectorate of Mines regulations, because it is still classed as a working pit. Visitors wear a plastic hard hat, safety lamp, and a battery on a waist belt which weighs 5 kilograms (11 lb). Visitors must also carry on their belt a rebreather, which in case of emergency will filter foul air for approximately one hour, giving a chance for survival and escape.

Before taking the 50 minute underground tour 90 metres (300 ft) below ground, contraband must be surrendered, such as anything containing a dry cell battery from watches to mobile phones. The dangers of the mine are real, the safety posters on the stages of Carbon Monoxide poisoning serve as museum pieces and as real reminders of the dangers underground. Automatic gas monitoring systems are discreetly positioned around the tunnels, as are emergency telephone systems. Some safety beams were monitored around the area.

The museum hired mining apprentices in 2011; after serving an apprenticeship, the trainees would then have the necessary qualifications to work in a mine. Museum staff walked out in disputes over pay in 2014, 2015 and 2016.

=== Entry charges ===
As part of the National Museum Wales, Big Pit became free to enter in 2001, and in 2015 First Minister Carwyn Jones announced that there would be "no payment for entry into any of the National Museums attractions". In April 2025, in response to rising costs, the museum introduced charging for the underground tour, initially on a trial basis until July 2026. The fee was £8 for a pre-purchased timed-ticket, with £5 concessions or on-the-day first-come, first-served access. Entry to other parts of the museum remains free. The decision to charge drew criticism from the Senedd committee for Culture, Communications, Welsh Language, Sport, and International Relations which stated that it violated the principle of free admission to "national collections", and called on the Welsh Government to provide sufficient funding to maintain free access.

== Popular culture ==
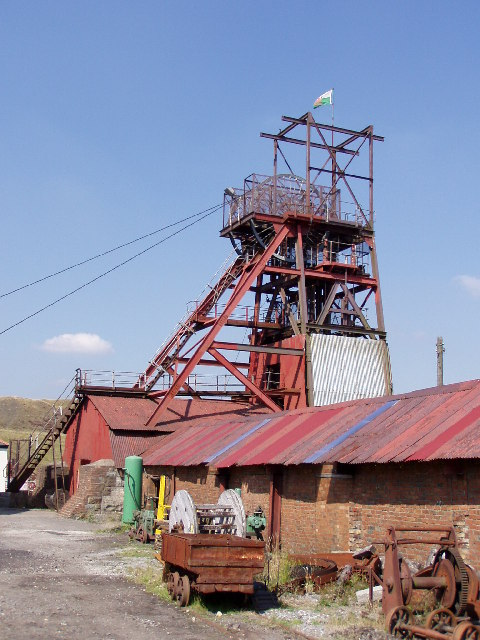
Big Pit winding tower

The cover of the Manic Street Preachers album National Treasures – The Complete Singles shows the Big Pit winding tower.

Historian Gwyn A. Williams used the Big Pit as a setting for one of his programmes in his Channel 4 series The Dragon Has Two Tongues, broadcast in January 1985 - near the end of the miners' strike and as men were returning to work. In it, Williams said "Today it looks to me as if the Welsh people have been declared redundant, as redundant as this pit which after 200 years is now a museum. This is a museum. Wales is being turned into a land of museums!"

== See also ==
- Mining in Wales
- Mining accident
- South Wales Coalfield
- South Wales Coalfield Collection
- 1926 United Kingdom general strike
- 1984–1985 United Kingdom miners' strike
- Rhondda Heritage Park
- National Coal Mining Museum for England
- Rhymney
- Blaenavon
- Blaenavon Industrial Landscape
