= Garndiffaith railway station =

Former railway station in Wales

Garndiffaith

General information
- Location: Torfaen; Wales
- Coordinates: 51.7348°N 3.0624°W
- Grid reference: SO267045
- Line: Brynmawr and Blaenavon Railway
- Platforms: ?

Other information
- Status: Disused

History
- Original company: London and North Western Railway
- Pre-grouping: London and North Western Railway
- Post-grouping: London, Midland and Scottish Railway

Key dates
- 1912: Station opens
- 1941: Station closes
Location

Garndiffaith railway station (Six Bells) served the village of Garndiffaith, located in Torfaen, south east Wales. Build by the London and North Western Railway (LNWR) as an expansion for the Brynmawr and Blaenavon Railway to meet the Great Western Railway (GWR) at Abersychan and Talywain.

== History ==
The halt originally opened as Six Bells in 1912; it was renamed as Garndiffaith in 1922. Passenger use ceased during the Second World War, though the line was still in use for coal trains until closure in 1980.

== The station site today ==
A cycle path has since been built on the line and through the site of the former station, part of the National Cycle Network Route 46.

Reopening the station to the public has become one of the long-term aims of the preserved Pontypool and Blaenavon Railway, whom aim to rebuild the station, as part of its expansion plans.

Preceding station	Disused railways	Following station
Varteg	Brynmawr and Blaenavon Railway	Abersychan and Talywain
