= Pentrepiod Halt railway station =

Pentrepiod Halt railway station may refer to the following stations in Wales:

- Pentrepiod Halt railway station (Gwynedd)
- Pentrepiod Halt railway station (Monmouthshire)
