= Abersychan Low Level railway station =

Disused railway station in Abersychan, Torfaen

Coordinates: 51°43′27.9″N 3°3′29.7″W

Abersychan Low Level
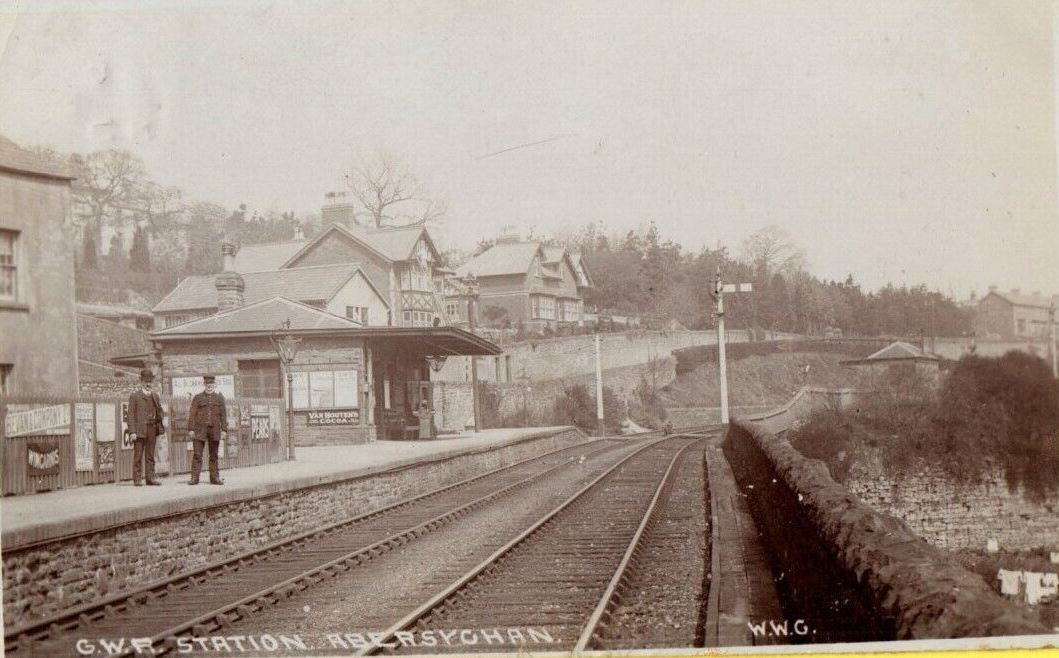

General information
- Location: Abersychan, Torfaen; Wales
- Grid reference: SO270033
- Platforms: 2

Other information
- Status: Disused

History
- Original company: Monmouthshire Railway and Canal Company
- Pre-grouping: Great Western Railway
- Post-grouping: Great Western Railway

Key dates
- 2 October 1854: Opens as "Abersychan"
- 14 May 1885: Renamed
- 30 April 1962: Station closes
Location

Abersychan Low Level railway station served the town of Abersychan in the Welsh county of Monmouthshire. It was located near the junction of the A4043 and the B4246 at the eastern end of the town.

== History ==
The station was opened as "Abersychan" by the Monmouthshire Railway and Canal Company on 2 October 1854. It was renamed "Abersychan Low Level" on 14 May 1885; this came not long after the opening of Abersychan and Talywain by the London and North Western Railway on its joint line with the Monmouthshire Railway between Pontnewynydd Junction and Varteg Colliery which opened in 1879. By this time the Monmouthshire was for most practical purposes part of the Great Western Railway, which had worked it from August 1875 and eventually took it over with effect from 1 August 1880.

The line then passed on to the Western Region of British Railways on nationalisation in 1948. At a time of withdrawal of services on a number of other lines in South Wales, the station was closed to passengers by the British Transport Commission on 30 April 1962 and to goods in May 1962. At the time of closure the station had an approximately hourly service in each direction.

Preceding station	Disused railways	Following station
Cwmffrwd Halt; Line and station closed	Great Western Railway; Monmouthshire Railway and Canal Company	Snatchwood Halt; Line and station closed

== The site today ==
The site is now a residential development behind the Rising Sun public house.
