= Pontnewynydd railway station =

Former railway station in Wales

Pontnewynydd

General information
- Location: Pontnewynydd, Torfaen; Wales
- Coordinates: 51.710661°N 3.053108°W
- Platforms: 2

Other information
- Status: Disused

History
- Original company: Monmouthshire Railway and Canal Company
- Pre-grouping: Great Western Railway
- Post-grouping: Great Western Railway

Key dates
- 1795: Blaenavon Tramroad opens
- 1 June 1854: MR&CC line opened
- 30 April 1962: Station closed
- May 1962: Line closed
Location

Pontnewynydd railway station served Pontnewynydd village in the Welsh county of Monmouthshire.

== History ==
In 1795 the Blaenavon Tramroad was opened from Pontnewynydd to Blaenavon Ironworks with branches to Abersychan, Varteg and Cwm Ffrwd to carry iron nearly 6 miles from Blaenavon Ironworks to the Monmouthshire Canal at Pontnewynydd. The line was modified to a standard gauge railway by 1855 by the Monmouthshire Railway and Canal Company.

The station (on the Newport - Blaenavon line) closed in April 1962, which was more than a year before the "Beeching Axe".

In financial terms the line was doing no worse than any of the other lines in the South Wales valleys but, like the local ironworks, the closure of the railway line was also linked to the opening of Llanwern steelworks. The amount of freight traffic the new plant generated was causing severe rail congestion in the Newport area and in an era when passenger rail transport was in decline a number of local services in Monmouthshire were withdrawn by the British Transport Commission as an operational measure.

Preceding station	Disused railways	Following station
Snatchwood Halt; Line and station closed	Great Western Railway; Monmouthshire Railway and Canal Company	Pontypool Crane Street; Line and station closed

== The site today ==
The site is now a car park.

== Bibliography ==
- Barrie, Derek Stiven Maxwelton (1980). A Regional History of the Railways of Great Britain. Vol. 11 South Wales. Newton Abbot: David & Charles. ISBN 0-7153-7970-4.
- Quick, Michael (2023) [2001]. Railway passenger stations in Great Britain: a chronology (PDF). version 5.05. Railway & Canal Historical Society.
