= Blaendare Road Halt railway station =

Disused railway station in Torfaen, Wales

Coordinates: 51.6972°N 3.0346°W

Blaendare Road Halt
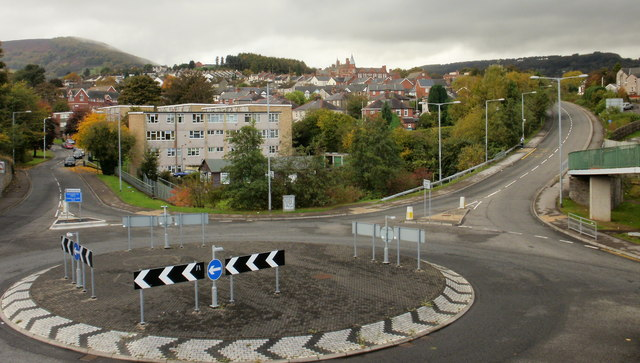
- Cwmynyscoy roundabout in 2009. The road to the right was built on the old trackbed, with the Halt situated in the distance.

General information
- Location: Pontypool, Torfaen; Wales
- Platforms: 2

Other information
- Status: Disused

History
- Original company: Great Western Railway
- Pre-grouping: Great Western Railway
- Post-grouping: Great Western Railway

Key dates
- 30 April 1928: Opened
- 30 April 1962: Closed
Location

Blaendare Road Halt railway station served Pontymoile and Cwmynyscoy to the south of Pontypool town centre in Torfaen, South Wales, UK.

== History ==
The station was opened by the Great Western Railway on 30 April 1928 on its line from Pontypool to Newport. The Halt lay between Pontypool Crane Street to the north and Coedygric Junction to the south. Passenger services were withdrawn and the station closed on 30 April 1962.

The trackbed has been redeveloped into a roadway, and proceeds north-west as a footpath.

Preceding station	Disused railways	Following station
Pontypool Crane Street; Line and station closed	Great Western Railway; Monmouthshire Railway and Canal Company	Panteg; Line and station closed
