= Pontnewynydd =

Suburb of Pontypool, Wales

Coordinates: 51°42′N 3°03′W

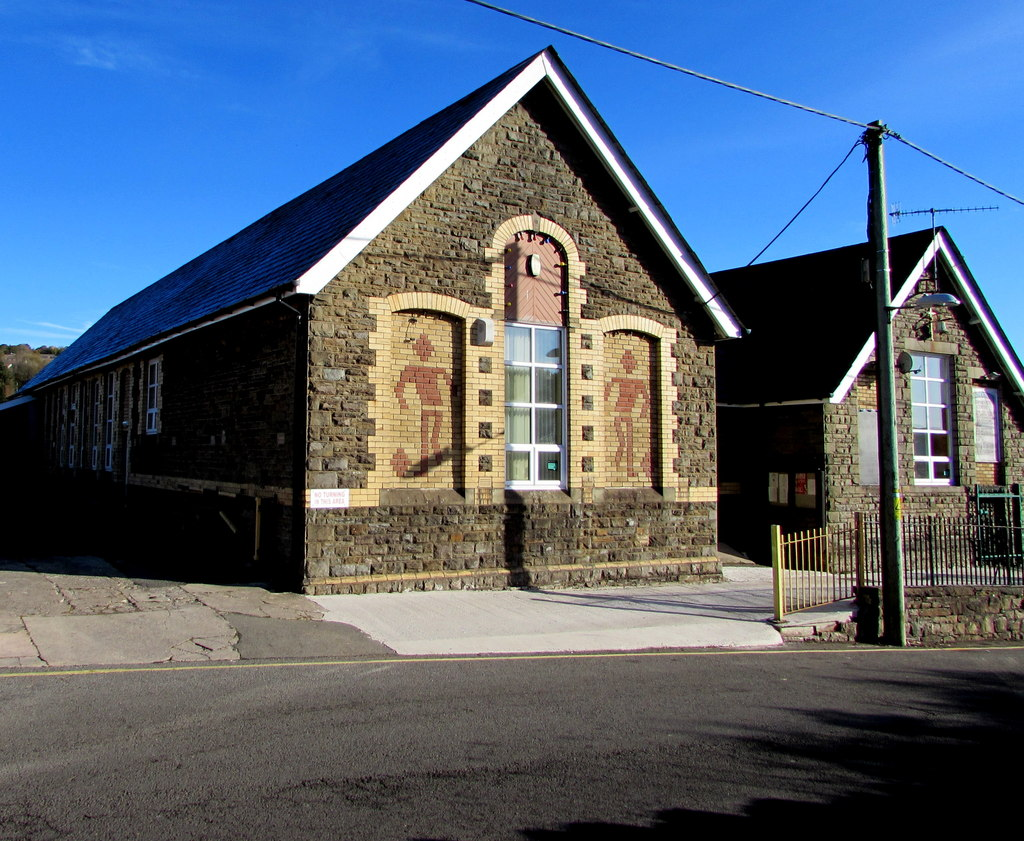
Pontnewynydd Community Centre, Pentrepiod Road, Pontnewynydd. Pontnewynydd Community Centre is also known as Zion Hill Community

Pontnewynydd is a predominantly working class suburb of Pontypool, Torfaen, in Wales. It should not be confused with Pontnewydd in nearby Cwmbran.

In 2001 the population was 1527 with an electorate of 1,174.

== Location ==
Pontnewynydd lies between Pontypool to the south and Snatchwood to the north. The area of Torfaen is historically industrial and the Pontnewynydd Iron Works once employed many people. This works was later renamed the Partridge Jones and John Paton (PJ & JP) Iron Works. During the Second World War, the works produced much of the corrugated iron for the Anderson shelters that were constructed throughout the country as makeshift air raid shelters. It finally closed in 1961, along with a number of other local works, when the Llanwern Steelworks opened in Newport.

The Monmouthshire Canal which ran from Newport to Pontnewynydd was authorised by an Act of Parliament on 3 June 1792. The section of canal from Pontymoile to Pontnewynydd was drained in the 1850s and the canal bed used to lay a railway line, which was eventually extended to Blaenavon.

== Amenities ==
There is a small selection of shops and a car repairs garage.

The main social club built for the workers at the PJ & JP works was located adjacent to the works on Hanbury Road and continued long after the works closed. An example of its prominence in the area is that the club was the official host to the visiting South African Springboks rugby touring team during 1961 when they played at Pontypool. The club hosted regular live entertainment and boxing bouts.

The local Pontnewynydd Sports & Social Club has recently ended a very long association with The Royal British Legion. Membership applications have soared since this happened and it is looking forward to being the premier entertainments centre in the village.

There are regular buses south to Pontypool, Cwmbran and Newport and north to Abersychan, Varteg Hill and Blaenavon. However, there is no longer a train service, the local station (on the Newport - Blaenavon line) having closed in April 1962, more than a year before the "Beeching Axe". In financial terms the line was doing no worse than other lines in the South Wales valleys but, like the local ironworks, the closure of the railway line was linked to the opening of Llanwern steelworks. The amount of freight traffic the new plant generated was causing severe rail congestion in the Newport area and, in an era when passenger rail transport was in decline, a number of local services in Monmouthshire were withdrawn by the British Transport Commission as an operational measure.

A resurgence (spring) beside the Afon Lwyd is used as a supply by Welsh Water. The flow has been traced as originating at locations within Ogof Draenen.

== Education ==
Education in the village was provided by Pontnewynydd Primary School. The school, located in a building constructed in 1901, opened in 1903. It closed in July 2015.

== Churches ==
Pontnewynydd Methodist Church is on St Luke's Road and comes under the District of Wales Synod Cymru. It was likely built in the late 19th century, specifically in 1879. This is because the Church of St. Luke, erected on the site of an older building, was consecrated in August 1879, as stated in a MonGenes post.

== Governance ==
Pontnewynydd forms an electoral ward electing a community councillor to Pontypool Community Council. For elections to Torfaen County Borough Council, Pontnewynydd is part of the Pontnewynydd and Snatchwood ward, electing two councillors.

== Notable residents ==
- Sir John Ballinger, CBE, the first librarian at the National Library of Wales was born here in 1860. His father was employed at the Iron Works.
- The poet Myfanwy Haycock was born in the village in 1913.
- The soprano Dame Gwyneth Jones was born locally in 1936.
- The author David Llewellyn grew up in the village.
