= Cwmffrwd Halt railway station =

Disused railway station in Cwmffrwd, Carmarthenshire

Cwmffrwd Halt

General information
- Location: Victoria Village, Torfaen; Wales
- Coordinates: 51.731098°N 3.057971°W
- Platforms: 2

Other information
- Status: Disused

History
- Original company: Monmouthshire Railway and Canal Company
- Pre-grouping: Great Western Railway
- Post-grouping: Great Western Railway

Key dates
- 13 July 1912: Opened
- 30 April 1962: Closed
Location

Cwmffrwd Halt railway station served the settlement of Victoria Village, near Abersychan, Torfaen, Wales, from 1912 to 1962 on the Eastern Valley branch of the Monmouthshire Railway and Canal Company network.

== History ==
The station was opened on 13 July 1912 by the Monmouthshire Railway and Canal Company, later the Great Western Railway. It closed on 30 April 1962.

Preceding station	Disused railways	Following station
Abersychan Low Level; Line and station closed	Great Western Railway; Monmouthshire Railway and Canal Company	Cwmavon (Monmouthshire); Line and station closed
