= William Llewelyn Davies =

Welsh librarian (1887–1952)

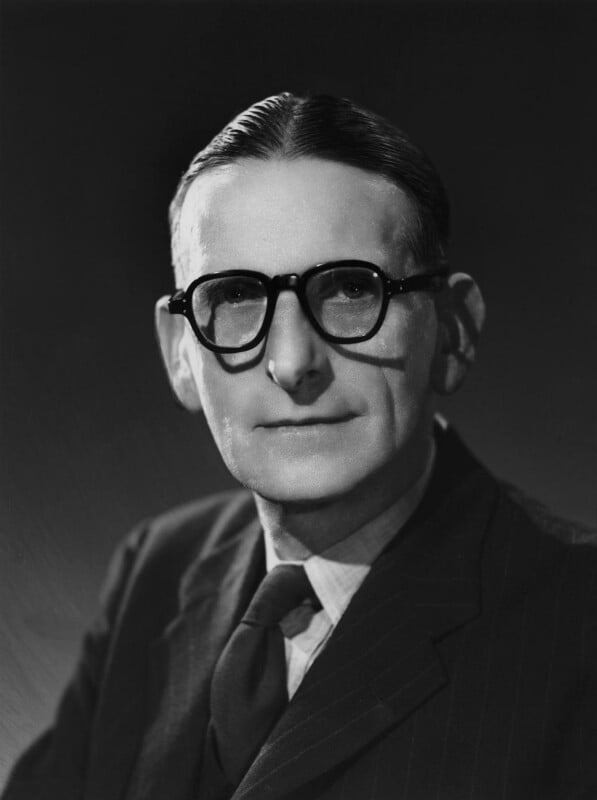
Davies in 1947

Sir William Llewelyn Davies (born William Davies; 11 October 1887 – 11 November 1952) was a Welsh librarian who was chief librarian of the National Library of Wales, Aberystwyth from 1930 until his death.

== Early life and education ==
Davies was born at Plas Gwyn schoolhouse near Pwllheli, in Caernarfonshire, north Wales. His father was a gamekeeper. He was educated in Porthmadog and was a pupil-teacher in Penrhyndeudraeth before studying at the University College of Wales (later to become Aberystwyth University), taking honours in Welsh.

== Career ==
After graduating, Davies taught in various locations in Wales and at the University College, Cardiff (later to become Cardiff University). He was a member of the Royal Garrison Artillery during the First World War and then an officer in the Army Education Service. In 1919, he was appointed first assistant librarian at the National Library of Wales in Aberystwyth, under John Ballinger; he succeeded Ballinger on his retirement in 1930 and continued as chief librarian until his death.

During his time as chief librarian, he transformed the library with a large acquisition programme, which collected and preserved many Welsh manuscripts and materials located in private hands or other collections. In total he acquired approximately 3.3 million documents (the library had only about 200,000 documents when he was appointed chief librarian). He started the library's academic journal and wrote its official history.

His work for the library and Wales were noted with the award of a knighthood in 1944 and an honorary doctorate by the University of Wales in 1951. He served as High Sheriff of Merionethshire in 1951.

He died at the age of 65 in Aberystwyth on 11 November 1952. Following his death his ashes were scattered on the grounds of the library.

== Personal life ==
He added the surname "Llewelyn" after marrying Gwen Llewellyn in 1914.

Academic offices
Preceded by John Ballinger	Librarian of the National Library of Wales; 1930–1952	Succeeded by Thomas Parry
