= Big Pit Halt railway station =

Railway station in Torfaen, Wales

Big Pit Halt
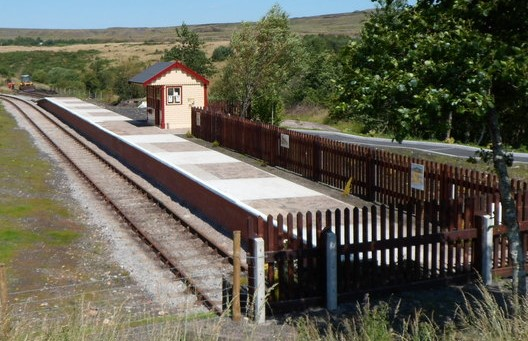

General information
- Location: Blaenavon, Torfaen; Wales
- Coordinates: 51.7741°N 3.1050°W
- Grid reference: SO238091
- System: Station on heritage railway
- Platforms: 1

History
- Opened: 2012
- Original company: Brynmawr and Blaenavon Railway
Location

Big Pit Halt railway station is a railway station on the Pontypool and Blaenavon Railway heritage line, adjacent to Big Pit National Coal Museum, Blaenavon, Wales.

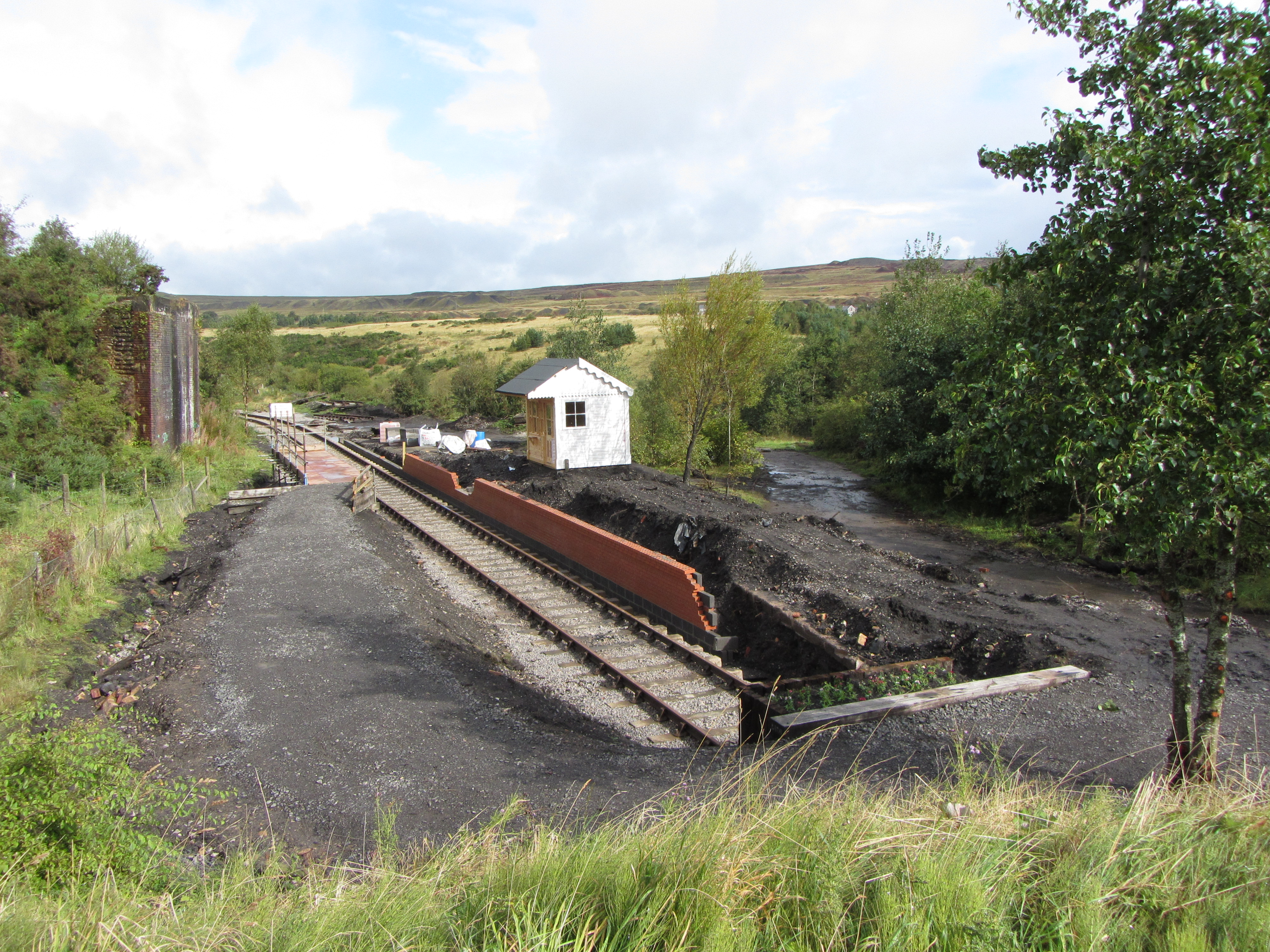
Big Pit Halt during construction

The station opened on 6 April (Good Friday) 2012, however the line to Big Pit actually opened on Friday 16 September 2011. The single track line and station opened specifically for tourists visiting the museum.

== Notes ==
Preceding station	Heritage railways	Following station
Furnace Sidings towards Whistle Inn Halt	Pontypool & Blaenavon Railway	Terminus
