= John Ballinger (librarian) =

Welsh librarian (1860–1933)

Sir John Ballinger CBE (12 May 1860 – 8 January 1933) was a Welsh librarian, the first librarian at the National Library of Wales. He was described by a later librarian at the National Library, Andrew Green, as "one of the most distinguished professional librarians of his time".

== Biography ==
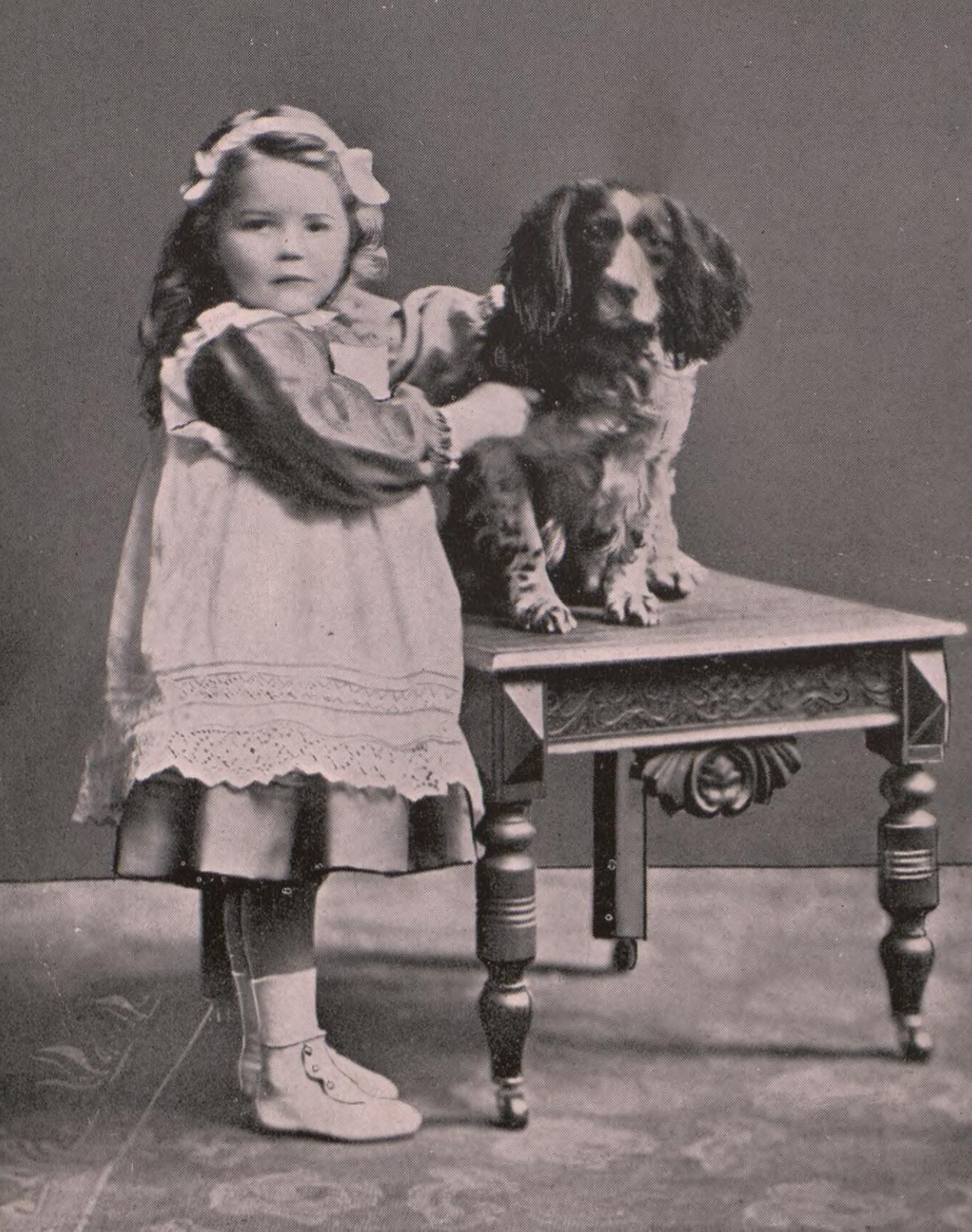
Ballinger's daughter Amy Noel Morfydd in 1909

Ballinger was born in Pontnewynydd, near Pontypool, Monmouthshire, the son of Henry Ballinger, an engineer. When his father lost his job at the Pontnewynydd Iron Works, the family moved to Whitchurch, Cardiff, where he found employment in the Melingriffith Works. Ballinger then lost his father when he was six.

He attended the elementary school in Canton, Cardiff, but had left school by the age of 14. He received a year of private education, and attended evening classes while looking for employment. At the age of fifteen, in 1875, Ballinger became an assistant in the Cardiff Free Library, and later at the Swansea Public Library.

He was appointed Librarian at the public library in Doncaster, Yorkshire in 1880 despite his young age. Here he built his reputation and began writing a column, "About books", in the local newspaper, The Doncaster Chronicle.

Ballinger returned to Cardiff in 1884, this time taking the post of Librarian at the Cardiff Free Library. During his period as Librarian, the number of books borrowed rose from 7,000 to 750,000 a year. There were 100,000 volumes in the collections by 1905, and 20,000 of these were works related to Wales.

When the movement began to press for a National Library in Wales, Ballinger kept an eye on progress as was by far the best-known librarian in Wales. Sir John Williams had promised a donation to the new library, and it was he who offered Ballinger the post of librarian, without competition.

He began on 1 January 1909, with a salary of £600, £100 more than at his previous post in Cardiff, with a pension. He retired on 31 May 1930 and was thanked by the Court of Governors for:

devoting all your energies to the formation and administration of a national institution which, from comparatively small beginnings, has now become one of the great libraries of the world ... due in no small measure to your abundant energy, driving power, capacity for taking pains, and ability not only to discover, but also to secure valuable collections for the Library.

Of his many achievements, there were special mentions for securing the National Library's status as a legal deposit, and gaining "the continued interest and support of the general public". During this time, Ballinger received an honorary MA from the University of Wales in 1909, a CBE in 1920, honorary Fellow of the Library Association in 1929, a knighthood on 1 January 1930 and the Medal of the Honourable Society of Cymmrodorion in 1932.

He retired to Hawarden, Flintshire, there, he offered advice to St Deiniol's Library and resumed his publishing career and his commitment to the historical bibliography of Wales.

Ballinger's health was poor and he died on 8 January 1933. He was interred in the churchyard in Hawarden. His wife, Amy, died on 28 October 1933.

Academic offices
Preceded by None	Librarian of the National Library of Wales; 1909–1930	Succeeded by William Llewelyn Davies
