= Garn-yr-erw =

Coordinates: 51.7837°N 3.1098°W

Garnyrerw
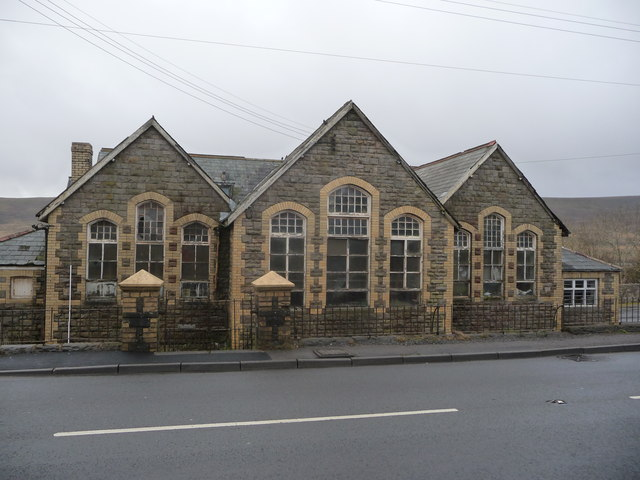
- Old school building at Garn-yr-Erw

- Location within Torfaen
- Principal area: Torfaen
- Preserved county: Gwent
- Country: Wales
- Sovereign state: United Kingdom
- Post town: PONTYPOOL
- Postcode district: NP4
- Dialling code: 01495
- Police: Gwent
- Fire: South Wales
- Ambulance: Welsh
- UK Parliament: Torfaen

Garn-yr-erw, officially spelled Garnyrerw, is a village in south-eastern Wales, lying at the source of the Afon Llwyd north of Blaenavon and Pontypool, within the historic boundaries of Monmouthshire. The village lies at an altitude of approx 400 metres on the side of Gilwern Hill, Monmouthshire and is cited by the Ordnance Survey as the highest village in Wales.

The village had a station on the Pontypool and Blaenavon Railway from 1913 until the line's closure in 1941.

In October 2026, the official spelling was agreed to be "Garnyrerw".

== See also ==
- Mining in Wales
