= Y Garn =

Y Garn is Welsh for the cairn or the rock and is the name of several hills in Wales.

- Y Garn (Glyderau), 947 meters in northern Snowdonia
- Y Garn (Nantlle Ridge), 633 meters in central Snowdonia
- Y Garn (Rhinogydd), 629 meters in southern Snowdonia
- Y Garn (Plynlimon), 684 meters in Mid Wales
