= GARN (company) =

American alternative energy company

Coordinates: 45.027983°N 93.210390°W

GARN, Inc.
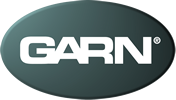
- Company type: Private
- Industry: Sustainable Energy
- Founded: 1984
- Founder: Martin Lunde
- Headquarters: Minneapolis, MN, U.S.
- Area served: US and Canada
- Key people: Martin R. Lunde (President)
- Products: Wood-fired hydronic boilers, alternative energy products
- Website: GARN.com

GARN is an American alternative energy company and manufacturer of smokeless wood-burning furnaces with integrated hydronic thermal storage.

== History ==
GARN pioneered wood gasification in conjunction with thermal storage in 1984, after GARN founder Martin Lunde developed the technology under a contract with the U.S. Department of Energy in the late 1970s, along with researchers Richard Snyder and James Buesing. Lunde was awarded patents in wood-fired hydronic storage in the early 1980s.

In April 2015, the GARN WHS-2000 was the first ever hydronic wood heater to pass the EPA's Phase II "white tag" certification using cord wood as fuel.
