= Blaenavon High Level railway station =

Disused railway station in Torfaen, Wales

Blaenavon High Level
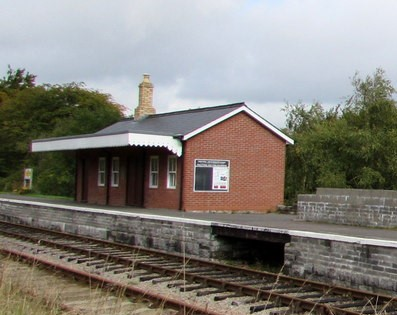
- Blaenavon High Level in September 2015

General information
- Location: Blaenavon, Torfaen; Wales
- Coordinates: 51.7686°N 3.0855°W
- Grid reference: SO251083
- System: Station on heritage railway
- Owner: London, Midland and Scottish Railway
- Manager: Pontypool and Blaenavon Railway
- Platforms: 2

History
- Pre-grouping: London and North Western Railway

Key dates
- 18 December 1869: Opened
- 5 May 1941: Closed
- May 2010: Reopened by the P&BR Preservation Society
Location

Blaenavon High Level is a railway station on the preserved Pontypool and Blaenavon Railway, serving the World Heritage Site and town of Blaenavon, south Wales.

It is currently the southernmost terminus of the P&BR, reopened thanks to an Order under the Transport and Works Act 1992 to extend and operate its line from the Whistle Inn halt in the north to the site of Blaenavon (High Level) some two miles to the south.

Originally the station was simply called 'Blaenavon'. The "High Level" suffix came after the 1948 nationalisation to differentiate it from Blaenavon Low Level – the other Blaenavon station, which was previously operated by the GWR.

In its time Blaenavon (High Level) station had up and down platforms. The up platform contained the main station buildings and was approached by a wide road providing for vehicular access. Also, on the up side was a loco shed and a goods shed. The down platform was built with a stone front wall and relatively narrow stone coping stones along its edge, behind the copers the majority of the platform was of ash or macadam stone.

The platform was approached from the main road by a steep footpath and the two platforms were joined by a barrow crossing. The platform contained a sizeable waiting room, and a notably tall signal box. The waiting room was fronted by blue diamond-cut setts rather than ash, whilst the area in front of the signal box was clad with wooden planks overlaying a cavity through which the rods and wires were channelled.

== History ==
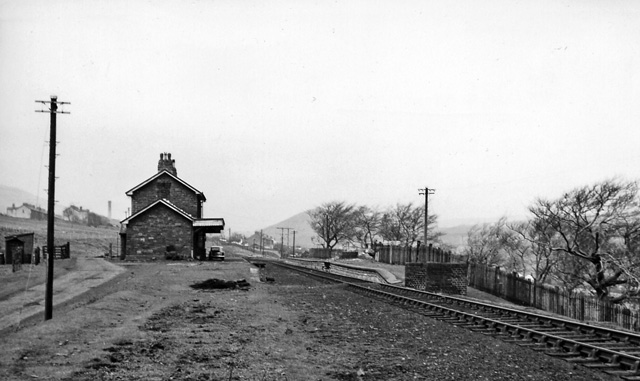
Remains of Blaenavon High Level station in 1965

The line from Brynmawr to Blaenavon was originally built in 1866 by the Brynmawr and Blaenavon Railway and immediately leased to the London and North Western Railway to transport coal to the Midlands via the Heads of the Valleys line. The line was completed in the late eighteen sixties and the LNWR were operating passenger trains over the line by 1872.

Eight years later it was extended to meet the Great Western Railway at Abersychan & Talywain. Here the line carried on down the valley through Pontypool Road Station to the coast at Newport. In 1922 the LNWR was grouped into the London, Midland and Scottish Railway. In later years the line saw a variety of GWR locomotives operating from pit to port, however the railway retained its LNWR infrastructure up until the very last days before its closure.

The line was closed to passengers in 1941 due to the exigencies of the Second World War. Blaenavon shed closed in 1942 and eventually goods also ceased in 1954. The line was retained for wagon storage until 1953, and around 1960, a temporary siding was laid in connection with opencast workings on the Blorenge nearby.

Not long after closure to passengers all the buildings on both the up and down platforms were demolished by British Rail. All, except some vestigial remains of the up platform were swept away, post-war, when the area was later occupied by a concrete works.

== Preservation ==
Despite the fact that virtually everything had been demolished, the preservation society were determined to save what had remained.

Firstly the volunteers cleared away the undergrowth the limited remains of the platform, with its attractive stone front wall and stone coping stones came into view. Unfortunately a minor setback occurred when the majority of the cut coarse stone was stolen within a year or two of its reconstruction. This forced the society to incorporate straightforward dense concrete blocks laid broad face down to replace what was taken from vandal attacks.

In late 2008 as work continued it was discovered that much of the original waiting room remained. Although the building had been demolished to the level of the original platform, the foundation walls were still retained, much of the brickwork was simply thrown into the intact cellars below. These walls were massively thick, and although their geometry was complicated, with some picking about, a clear footprint of the building emerged.

With the extension to Blaenavon (High Level) now re-opened, the railway preservation society intends to rebuild the entire original waiting room and replace the LNWR signal box on the platform in due course, returning the station to its original appearance and former glory.

Preceding station	Heritage railways	Following station
Furnace Sidings towards Whistle Inn Halt	Pontypool & Blaenavon Railway	Terminus
Planned extension
Furnace Sidings towards Whistle Inn Halt	Pontypool & Blaenavon Railway	Varteg Terminus
