= Contraband (coal mine) =

Items forbidden from coal mines for safety

Contraband in coal mines means items which are not allowed to be taken underground in a coal mine because if there is firedamp about they may start a fire or explosion. This includes: matches, tobacco and other smoking materials, anything that may cause sparks, anything with electric components except what has been safety-approved. They have to be declared before going down and left there, and collected after coming out of the mine.
