= Abersychan =

Town in Wales

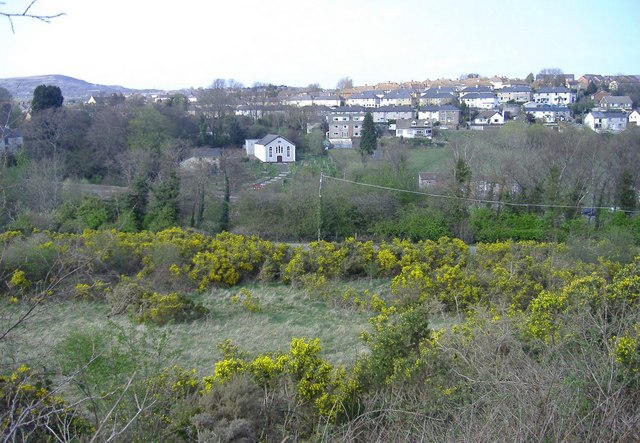
- Abersychan, viewed from Pen-twyn

- Location within Torfaen
- Area: 24.78 km^{2} (9.57 sq mi)
- Population: 7,064 (2011)
  - Density: 285/km^{2} (740/sq mi)
- GSS code: W04000759
- OS grid reference: SO 269 038
- Community: Abersychan
- Principal area: Torfaen
- Preserved county: Gwent
- Country: Wales
- Sovereign state: United Kingdom
- Post town: PONTYPOOL
- Postcode district: NP4
- Dialling code: 01495
- Police: Gwent
- Fire: South Wales
- Ambulance: Welsh
- UK Parliament: Torfaen
- Senedd Cymru – Welsh Parliament: Sir Fynwy Torfaen
- List of places UK Wales Torfaen 51.7239°N 3.0587°W Map of the community

Abersychan is a town and community north of Pontypool in Torfaen, Wales, and lies within the boundaries of the historic county of Monmouthshire and the preserved county of Gwent.

Abersychan lies in the narrow northern section of the Afon Lwyd valley.

The town includes two schools; Abersychan Comprehensive School and Victoria Primary School; together with various shops and other amenities including Abersychan Rugby Club.

Abersychan was the birthplace of the politicians Roy Jenkins, Don Touhig and Paul Murphy (member of parliament for Torfaen); and of the rugby footballers Wilfred Hodder, Candy Evans and Bryn Meredith.

== History ==
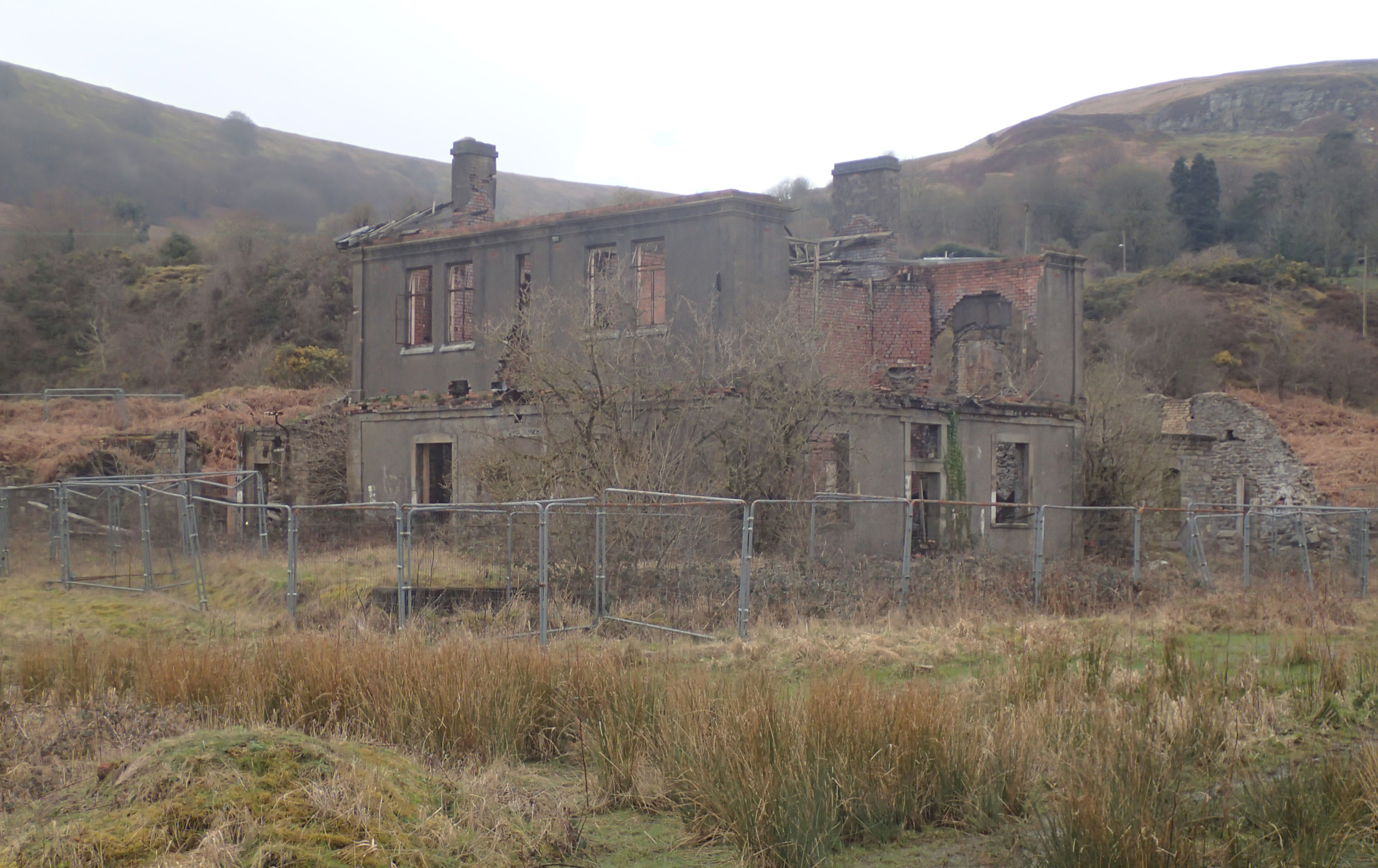
The ironwork's derelict main office building, designed by architect Decimus Burton

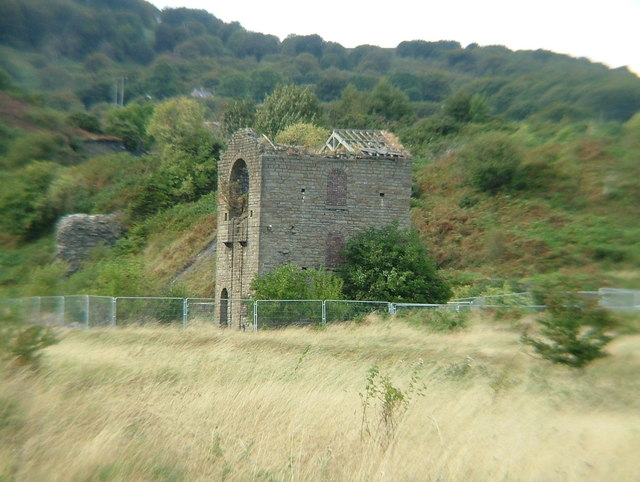
Disused pumping engine house at British Colliery

Like many of the 17th century isolated agricultural hamlets in the forested South Wales Valleys, Abersychan became a thriving industrial centre in the 19th and early 20th centuries, particularly for iron production.

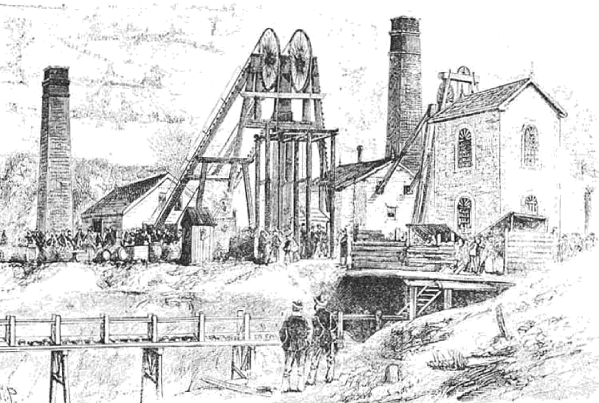
The Llanerch Colliery Disaster, the Pit's Mouth, from The Illustrated London News, 15 February 1890

After the discovery of iron stone locally, the principal ironworks were built by the British Iron Company in 1825, served mainly by the London and North Western Railway's Brynmawr and Blaenavon Railway. The ironwork's main office building and quadrangle were designed by architect Decimus Burton, best known for his design of London Zoo. The works passed to the New British Iron Company in 1843 and to the Ebbw Vale Company in 1852, before closing in 1889. On 6 February 1890, an underground explosion at Llanerch Colliery killed 176.

The site of the former ironworks today is a core site of 71 hectares (180 acres), and a total land area of 526 hectares (1,300 acres), includes a number of listed buildings:

- Abersychan Limestone Railway: built c. 1830 to carry limestone from Cwm Lascarn quarry to the British Ironworks.
- Air Furnace at British Ironworks
- British Colliery Pumping Engine House: a Cornish beam pumping engine house built by the British Iron Company. Built of sandstone with a slate roof, and retains several fixtures
- Cwmbyrgwm Colliery: Site of former colliery including remains of a water-balance headgear, chimney, oval shafts, water power dams, tramroad routes, and waste tips.

Various proposals have been made over the years to redevelop the site, currently under the ownership of HSBC, but none have so far passed the requirements of Torfaen county council.

== Local government ==
Abersychan constitutes a community and electoral ward of the county borough of Torfaen. The area was part of the ancient parish of Trevethin, in Monmouthshire. On 3 June 1864 Abersychan was constituted a local government district, governed by a local board. In 1894 Abersychan became an urban district and civil parish. The urban district was abolished in 1935, with most of its area passing to Pontypool urban district, and a small area going to Abercarn UD.

In 1974 the area became part of the borough of Torfaen, in the new local government county of Gwent. The community of Abersychan was formed in 1985, but no community council has yet been formed. Abersychan and Cwmavon is now a ward for the Pontypool Community Council. In 1996 Torfaen became a unitary authority.

The Abersychan community includes Abersychan, Cwmavon, Garndiffaith, Pentwyn, Talywain, Varteg, and Victoria Village.

== Local transport ==
The nearest railway stations to Abersychan are Pontypool & New Inn (3 miles), Llanhilleth (3.5 miles) and Abergavenny (7 miles). Abersychan was served by the following (disused) stations:

- Abersychan and Talywain railway station
- Abersychan Low Level railway station

== Places nearby ==
=== Pentwyn ===
Pentwyn, Torfaen is a small village located in the district of Abersychan. It contains a post office, several houses and a small play park. The village has a cricket team (Pontnewynydd CC) and is located right next to the old railway line. The cricket club celebrated its 100-year anniversary in 2006 with a successful tour to Cork, Ireland.

=== Victoria Village ===
Victoria Village is a small hamlet located in the district of Abersychan. It comprises a small village school and a number of houses. A small group of houses on Incline Road mark the beginning of the village and the village boundary is near Cwmavon. Victoria Primary School is also in this area, housed in large grounds. Many homes are built around the school's boundaries. Victoria Village primary school was opened in 1903 and closed by the council in 2018. The last head of the school was Miss Joy Dando.
