= Pontypool Crane Street railway station =

Former railway station in Wales

Pontypool Crane Street

General information
- Location: Pontypool, Torfaen; Wales
- Coordinates: 51.7007°N 3.0414°W
- Grid reference: SO281007

Other information
- Status: Disused

History
- Original company: Monmouthshire Railway and Canal Company
- Pre-grouping: London and North Western Railway and Great Western Railway
- Post-grouping: London, Midland and Scottish Railway and GWR

Key dates
- 30 June 1852: Opened
- 30 April 1962: Closed
Location

Pontypool Crane Street railway station served the town of Pontypool in the Welsh county of Monmouthshire.

Stations and junctions near Pontypool in 1909.

== History ==
With industry in the South Wales coalfield needing improved transport links the Monmouthshire Railway and Canal Company (MR&CC) opened the first line between Newport to Pontypool in 1852. The line initially terminated at Crane Street Station in Pontypool and was extended to Blaenavon in 1854. A second line, initially run by the LNWR and known locally as the "upper" or "high level" line, was opened in 1879 from just north of Crane St to Blaenavon High Level station and on to Brynmawr. The station was enlarged in 1894.

Crane Street was on the Newport to Blaenavon line which closed for passengers in 1962 (passenger services on the line to Brynmawr had ended in 1941). Part of the station building was used in the creation of a station on the Pontypool and Blaenavon Railway. The site of the station is now occupied by Tesco's car park in Pontypool.

Preceding station	Disused railways	Following station
Blaendare Road Halt	Great Western Railway; Monmouthshire Railway and Canal Company	Wainfelin Halt
