= Abersychan and Talywain railway station =

Disused railway station in Torfaen, Wales

Coordinates: 51°43′46.6″N 3°4′21.3″W

Abersychan and Talywain
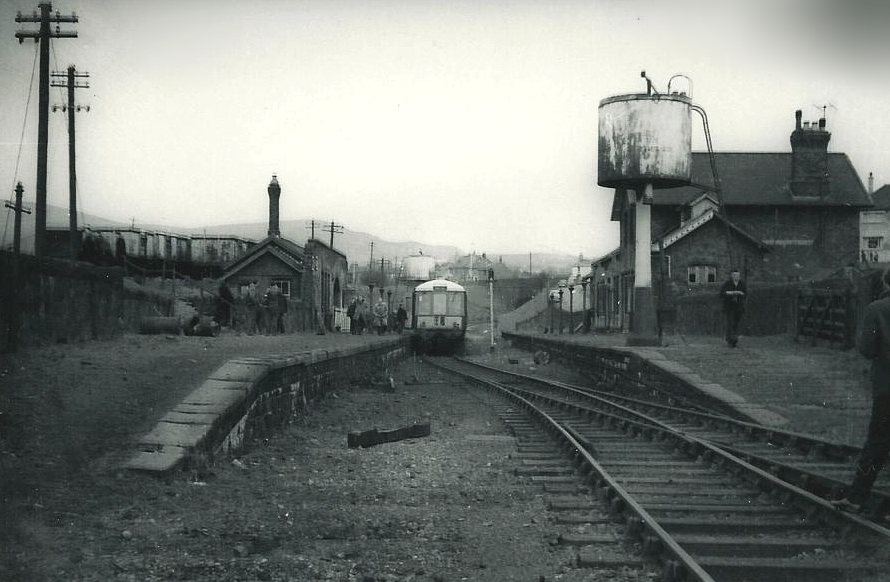
- Station in 1967.

General information
- Location: Torfaen; Wales
- Grid reference: SO260039
- Platforms: 2

Other information
- Status: Disused

History
- Original company: Brynmawr and Blaenavon Railway
- Pre-grouping: London and North Western Railway and Great Western Railway
- Post-grouping: London, Midland and Scottish Railway and GWR

Key dates
- 1 May 1878: Station opens
- 2 May 1941: Station closes
Location

Abersychan and Talywain station served the town of Abersychan in the Welsh county of Monmouthshire. The station was the meeting point for two major pre-grouping railways as they competed for the South Wales coal traffic.

== History ==
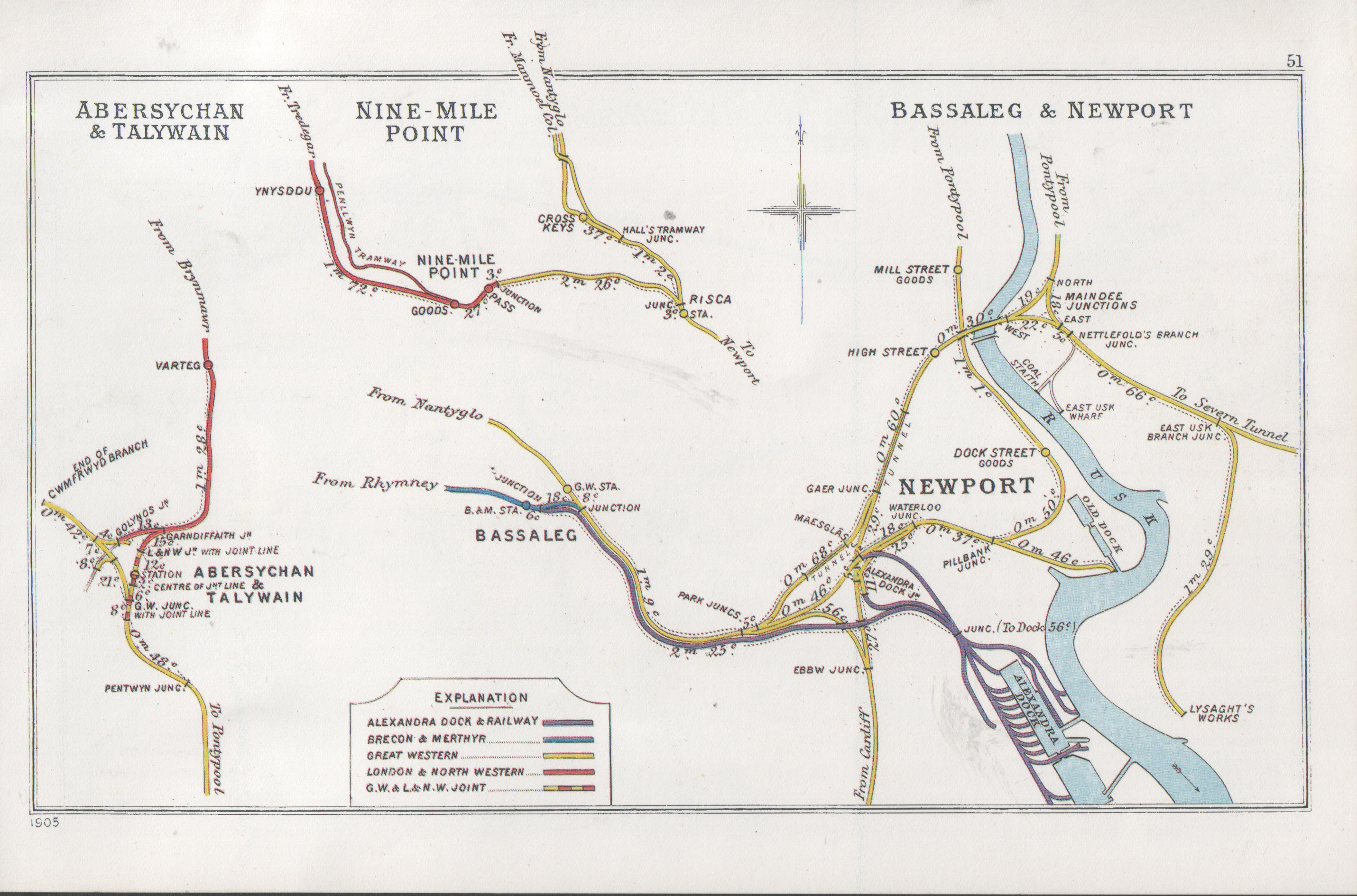
A 1905 Railway Clearing House Junction Diagram showing (left) railways in the vicinity of Abersychan and Talywain

Opened on 1 May 1878 by the Brynmawr and Blaenavon Railway, it became part of the London and North Western Railway which through the connection with the Heads of the Valleys Line was able to take coal directly to destinations in the Midlands. A junction with the Pontypool and Blaenavon Railway led to joint use once that railway was absorbed into the Great Western Railway.

Passenger use ceased during the Second World War, the first day without service being 5 May 1941, but general goods were carried until 1954 and the line was used by the Big Pit at Blaenavon until the coal mine closed in 1980.

== The station site today ==
The line through the station site can still be traced on an OS map. A cycle path has been built along the former line and through the site of the former station. The former goods shed of Abersychan and Talywain station near Church Road has also survived and is now used by private firm C & M Haulage.

Whilst the large goods shed was given listed building status on 28 July 1997 by the local Torfaen authority. Reopening the station is one of the long-term aims of the preserved Pontypool and Blaenavon Railway, whom aim to also rebuild the station as part of its expansion plans.

== Notes ==
Preceding station	Disused railways	Following station
Garndiffaith	Great Western Railway; Brynmawr and Blaenavon Railway	Pentwyn Halt
