= Blaenavon Low Level railway station =

Disused railway station in Torfaen, Wales

Coordinates: 51.7705°N 3.0845°W

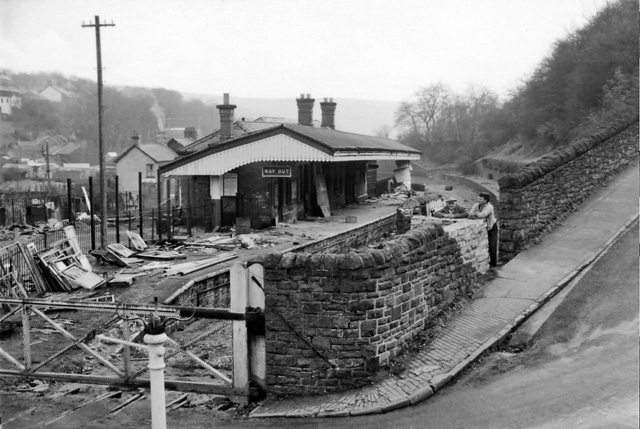
Blaenavon Low Level station in 1965, three years after closure

Blaenavon Low Level railway station was the northern terminus of the Monmouthshire Railway and Canal Company line from Pontypool to Blaenavon in Monmouthshire, Wales.

== History ==
The station opened as Blaenavon on 2 October 1854, along with the rest of the line from Blaenavon to Pontypool. Low Level was added to its name on 19 July 1950 The GWR "lower line", which ran along the valley floor to Blaenavon Low Level, closed on 30 April 1962, a year before the Beeching I report. A number of passenger lines in Monmouthshire were closed around this time due to falling passenger numbers.

== Today ==
Nothing visible remains of the station; the site has been used for housing.
