= Brynmawr and Blaenavon Railway =

Railway in South Wales

The Brynmawr and Blaenavon Railway was a railway line in South Wales, within the historic boundaries of Brecknockshire and Monmouthshire, originally built in 1866 and immediately leased to the London and North Western Railway to transport coal to the Midlands via the Heads of the Valleys line. The line was completed in the late 1860s and the LNWR were operating passenger trains over the line by 1872. Eight years later it was extended to meet the Great Western Railway at Abersychan & Talywain. Here the line carried on down the valley through Pontypool Crane Street railway station to the coast at Newport. In 1922 the LNWR was grouped into the London, Midland and Scottish Railway. In later years the line saw a variety of GWR locomotives operating from pit to port; however, the railway retained its LNWR infrastructure up until the last days before its closure.

== History ==
Brynmawr and Blaenavon Railway Act 1866
- Act of Parliament
- Parliament of the United Kingdom
- Long title: An Act for making a Railway from the Merthyr, Tredegar, and Abergavenny Railway near the Brynmawr Station thereof to Blaenavon; and for other Purposes.
- Citation: 29 & 30 Vict. c. ccix

Dates
- Royal assent: 16 July 1866

Text of statute as originally enacted

From the turn of the century the line served mining activity centred on several pits and collieries. The branch served several collieries between Brynmawr and Waunafon. The first of these was the Waun Nantyglo colliery, which was situated a little east of a tramway which later carried the B4248 Brynmawr to Blaenavon Road. The connection was removed by 1925. As Waunafon was approached on a facing branch to the left was built, leading to Clydach colliery, but these had gone by 1915, to be replaced by New Clydach Colliery sidings. Vestiges of these remained until 1950. Some 300m south of Waunafon station a branch, built in 1870, veered to the West to serve the Milfraen Colliery. The space between the single platform station at Waunafon and the branch was occupied by a series of loops and sidings. In 1913 a small platform, called Garn-yr-Erw Halt was built just north of the Whistle Road Bridge. This halt had no timetable for passengers as it was used only by miners.

By 1938, Milfraen Pit had ceased production having exhausted its own coal reserves, the branch line that served it was removed in 1937. The line was closed to passengers, not during the Beeching Cuts which befell the GWR route to Blaenavon Low Level, but in 1941 due to the exigencies of the Second World War. Blaenavon shed closed in 1942 and eventually goods also ceased in 1954. The line was retained for wagon storage until 1953, and around 1950, a temporary siding was laid in connection with opencast workings on the Blorenge, branching east roughly at the point where the Milfraen Colliery branch had previously branched west. The declining situation continued through the 1950s, then Varteg Hill subsequently closed in 1964 leaving Big Pit as the primary exporter of coal left. The once double track to Pontypool was then singled in June 1965. Although passenger and goods traffic had long ceased to Brynmawr the track was re-laid by the NCB to just south of Waunavon station again during the 1970s for the Black Lion Disposal Point washery.

== Locomotives ==
The passenger services were operated by the GWR & the freight services by the LMS. An impressive variety of locomotives operated over the years on this line, including:

- LNWR 0-6-2 Webb Coal Tanks
- LNWR 0-8-4 Beames Tanks
- GWR 0-6-0 Pannier Tanks
- GWR 2-8-0 Class 42xx heavy freight locomotives
- GWR 2-8-2 Class 72xx heavy freight locomotives

In its BR days the line was solely operated as a mineral line although several "specials" operated passenger trips over the line in the late 1970s, leading to several unusual visitors :

- Class 37 (the mainstay of the line in terms of motive power)
- Class 25 (often double headed)
- Class 31 (special trains)
- Class 20 (special trains)
- Class 45 (special trains)
- Class 101 DMU (special trains)
- Class 116 DMU (special trains)

== Closure and preservation ==
Although the track along the whole route to Brynmawr was finally lifted in July 1961. The 13-mile long section from Llantarnam Junction on the Newport-Hereford line to Furnace Sidings remained in use for coal trains from other local mines until 3 May 1980 following the closure of Big Pit. It was the last remaining railway in the Eastern Valleys. The line from Cwmbran was dismantled right up to outside Blaenavon High Level station whilst the washery and other colliery buildings were all but demolished during 1987. Much of the railway today has now become part of the National Cycle Network Route 46.

In 1980 a heritage railway movement was started, and is now operated exclusively by volunteers who form the Pontypool and Blaenavon Railway Company (1983) Ltd. and its support group the Pontypool & Blaenavon Railway Society. The society started running trains in the same year and have continued for over twenty five years.

The railway did not increase in track size for a quarter century after its opening, but increased as a going concern, with a larger number of volunteers, a larger amount of operational rolling stock, and more definite plans for the railway's future. The Pontypool Blaenavon Railway Company was then granted an Order under the Transport and Works Act to extend and operate the line. In May 2010 the railway was extended towards the town of Blaenavon, the nearest town to the railway's headquarters, a distance of roughly a mile and a quarter, to the site of the former Blaenavon High Level station, the London and North Western Railway's terminus station in the town.

Eventually, restoring and reopening the entire existing route from Brynmawr station to Pontypool Wainfelin marks the long-term goal and aspirations of the society.
