= Pontypool and Blaenavon Railway =

Heritage railway in South Wales

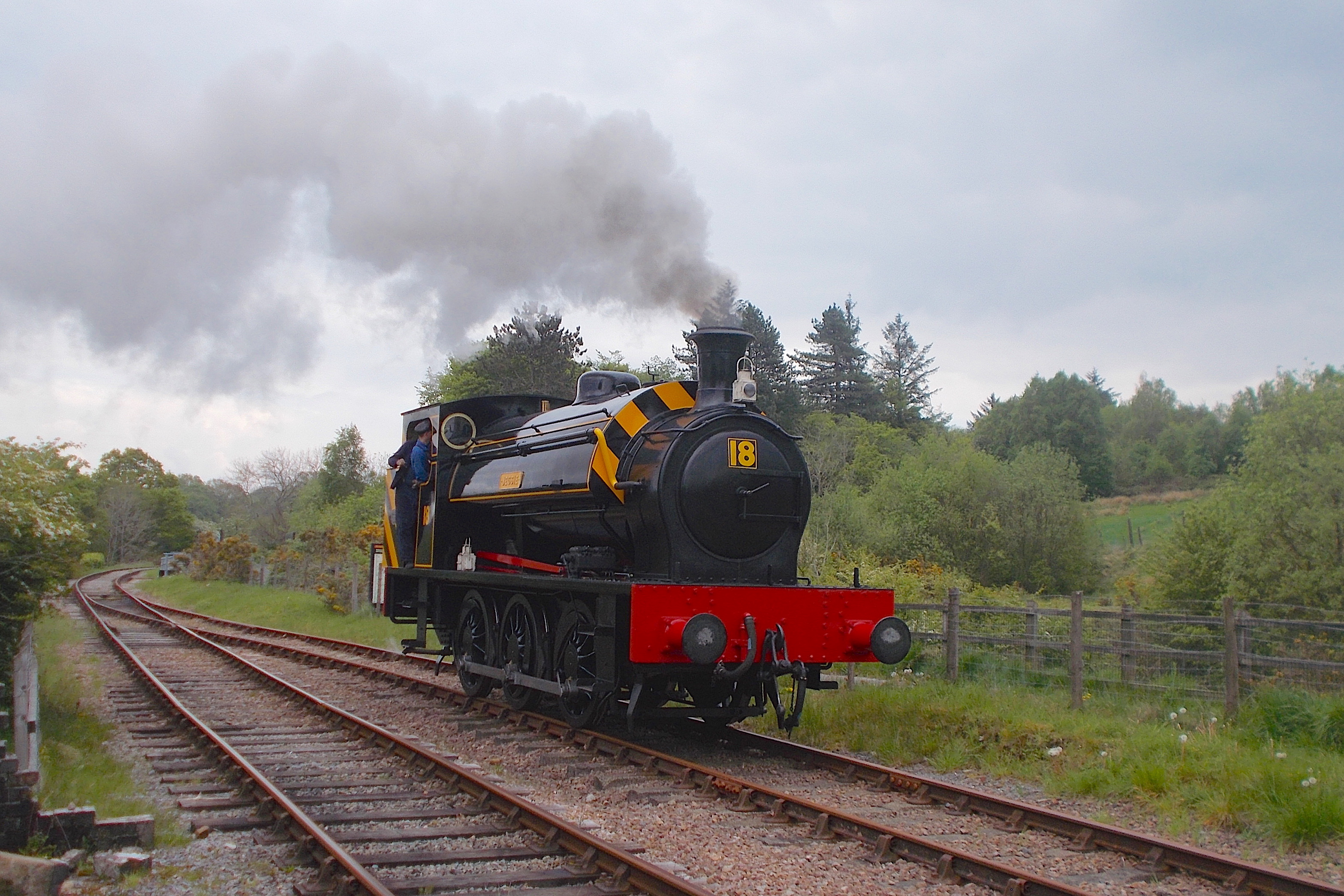
- Hunslet 18 Inch 0-6-0ST Eastmoor Steelworks No. 18 'Jessie' runs round the train at Blaenavon High Level
- Locale: Blaenavon
- Terminus: Blaenavon High Level

Commercial operations
- Name: Brynmawr and Blaenavon Railway
- Original gauge: 4 ft 8 1/2 in (1,435 mm) standard gauge

Preserved operations
- Operated by: Pontypool and Blaenavon Railway Company Ltd
- Stations: 4
- Length: 3.5 miles (5.6 km)
- Preserved gauge: 4 ft 8 1/2 in (1,435 mm) standard gauge

Commercial history
- Opened: 1866
- 1922: Absorbed by London, Midland and Scottish Railway
- Closed: 1941

Preservation history
- 1983: Taken over by the preservation society
- 2004: Work starts on extension to Blaenavon High Level
- 2010: Opening of extension to Blaenavon High Level
- 2011: Opening of extension to Big Pit Halt
- 2013: P&BR marks 30 years of running (and operating services along) the line
- 2015: The Little Engine That Could Events

Website
- www.bhrailway.co.uk

The Pontypool and Blaenavon Railway (Welsh: Rheilffordd Pont-y-pŵl a Blaenafon) is a 3.5-mile (5.6 km) volunteer-run heritage railway in South Wales, running trains between a halt platform opposite the Whistle Inn public house (famed for its collection of miners' lamps) southwards to the town of Blaenavon via a two-platform station at the site of former colliery furnace of the Big Pit National Coal Museum.

The line is the highest preserved standard-gauge line in the United Kingdom, and also uniquely having the only standard-gauge rail-over-rail bridge within preservation.

== History of the line ==
The line from Brynmawr to Blaenavon was originally built under the Brynmawr and Blaenavon Railway Act 1866 (29 & 30 Vict. c. ccix) by the Brynmawr and Blaenavon Railway and immediately leased to the London and North Western Railway (LNWR) to transport coal to the Midlands via the Heads of the Valleys line. The line was completed in 1869 and the LNWR commenced operating passenger trains over the line the following year (1870). Eight years later it was extended to meet the Great Western Railway (GWR) at Abersychan & Talywain. Here the line carried on down the valley through Pontypool Crane Street Station to the coast at Newport. In 1922, the LNWR was grouped into the London, Midland and Scottish Railway. In later years the line saw a variety of GWR locomotives operating from pit to port, however the railway retained its LNWR infrastructure up until the very last days before its closure.

=== Coal traffic ===
From the turn of the century the line served mining activity centred on several pits and collieries between Brynmawr and Waunafon. The first of these was the Waun Nantyglo colliery, which was situated a little east of a tramway which later carried the B4248 Brynmawr to Blaenavon Road. The connection was removed by 1925. As Waunafon was approached on a facing branch to the left was built, leading to Clydach colliery, but these had gone by 1915, to be replaced by New Clydach Colliery sidings. Vestiges of these remained until 1950. Some 300 yards (270 m) south of Waunafon station a branch, built in 1870, veered to the West to serve the Milfraen Colliery. The space between the single-platform station at Waunafon and the branch was occupied by a series of loops and sidings. In 1913 a small platform, called Garn-yr-Erw halt was built just north of the Whistle Road Bridge. This halt had no timetable for passengers as it was used only by miners.

=== Closures ===
By 1938 Milfraen Pit had ceased production having exhausted its own coal reserves, the branchline that served it was removed in 1937. The line was closed to passengers, not during the Beeching Cuts which befell the GWR route to Blaenavon Low Level, but in 1941 due to the exigencies of the Second World War. Blaenavon shed closed in 1942 and eventually goods also ceased in 1954. The line was retained for wagon storage until 1953, and around 1950, a temporary siding was laid in connection with opencast workings on the Blorenge, branching east roughly at the point where the Milfraen Colliery branch had previously branched west. The declining situation continued through the 1950s, then Varteg Hill subsequently closed in 1964, leaving Big Pit as the primary exporter of coal left. The once double track to Pontypool was then singled in June 1965. Although passenger and goods traffic had long ceased to Brynmawr the track was re-laid by the NCB to just south of Waunafon station again during the 1970s for the Black Lion Disposal Point washery.

Although the track along the whole route to Brynmawr was finally lifted in July 1961, the section from Blaenavon to Pontypool was still in use for coal trains from other local mines until Big Pit finally closed in 1980. The line from Cwmbran was dismantled right up to outside Blaenavon High Level station whilst the washery and other colliery buildings were demolished during 1987. Much of the railway today has now become part of the National Cycle Network Route 46.

== Visitor attraction ==
The railway between Furnace Sidings and Whistle Inn Halt was opened to visitors in 1983. It runs every weekend between spring and September. There is also a selection of special weekends through the spring and summer, daily (with the exceptions of Monday and Fridays) in August, as well as Santa Specials nearing Christmas.

The railway did not increase its length of track for a quarter century after its opening, but increased as a going concern, with a larger number of volunteers, a larger amount of operational rolling stock, and more definite plans for the railway's future.

== Expansion of the P&BR ==
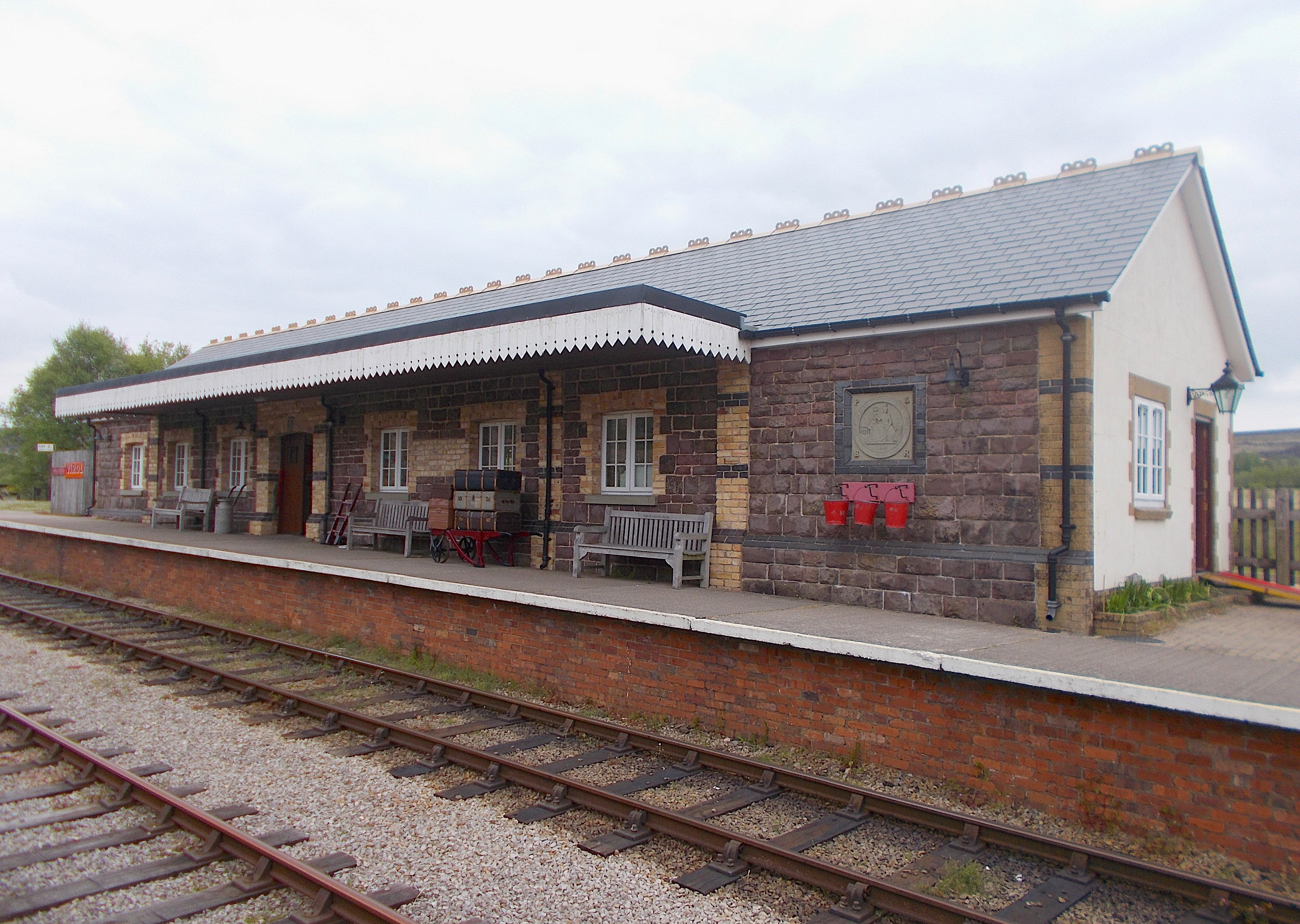
The new building at Blaenavon Furnace Sidings railway station

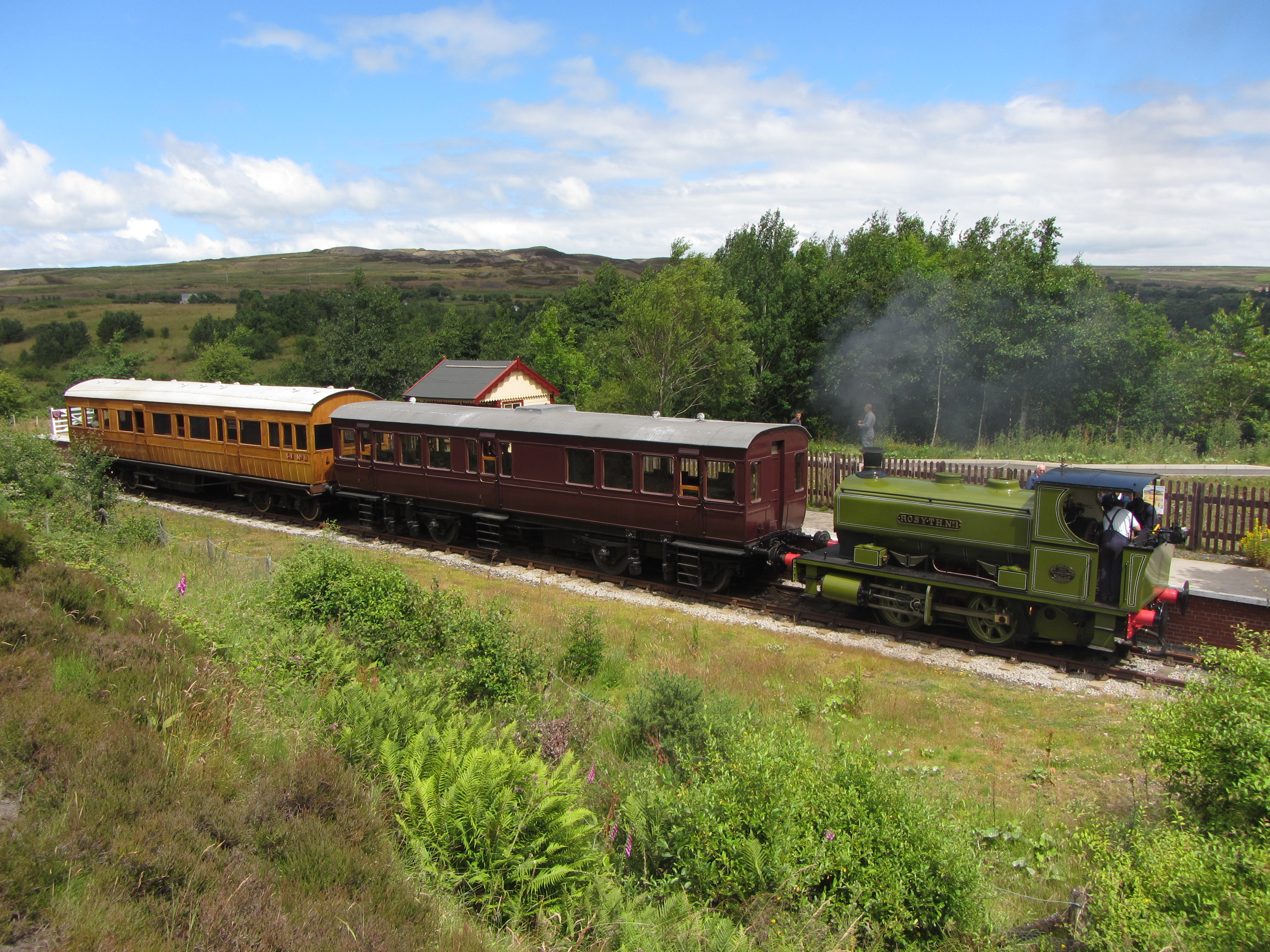
Andrew Barclay 0-4-0ST 'Rosyth' at Big Pit Halt

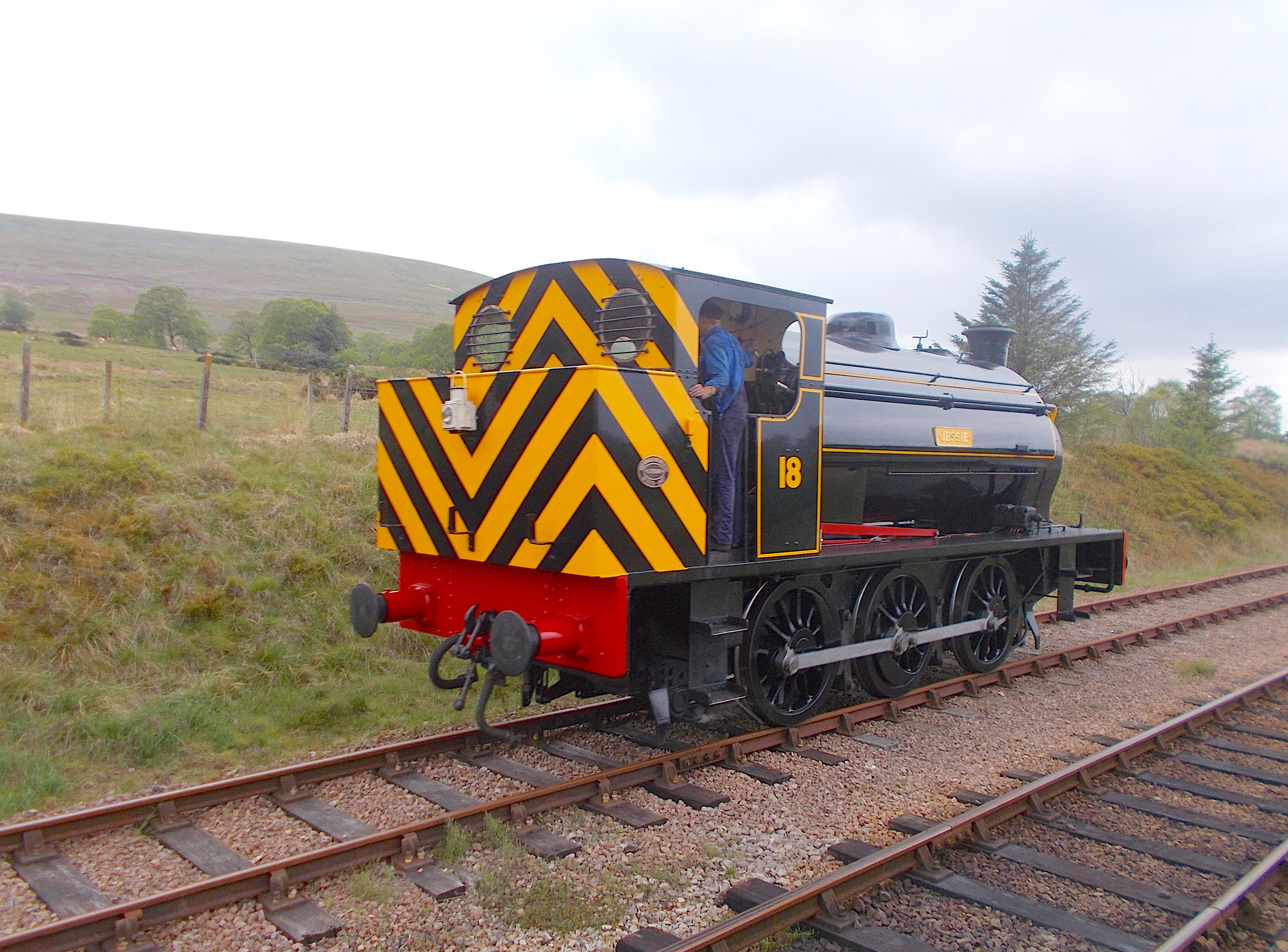
Hunslet 18 Inch 0-6-0ST Eastmoor Steelworks No. 18 'Jessie' runs round the train at Blaenavon Furnace Sidings

In May 2010 the railway was extended a distance of roughly one-and-a-quarter-mile (2.0 km) southwards to the site of the former Blaenavon High Level station (once the London and North Western Railway's station in the town).

The Pontypool Blaenavon Railway Company was granted an order under the Transport and Works Act 1992 (c. 42) to extend and operate the line.

Work, which started in late 2004, was initially complicated by difficulty in determining who built the railway. The order allowing most of the initial construction was the Brynmawr and Blaenavon Railway Act 1866 (29 & 30 Vict. c. ccix), but a short section in the south was built under the London and North Western Railway (Wales, &c.) Act 1874 (37 & 38 Vict. c. cxxx). Once the two months spent on this research was complete matters progressed rapidly so that a formal application to the Welsh Assembly was made on 3 May 2005. By the end of June 2005 the application became public with a two-month subsequent period allowed for formal objection.

By 28 November 2005, the inspector appointed by the National Assembly for Wales, Stuart B. Wild, MRTPI, MCMI made his report to the assembly. Subsequently, a full meeting of the planning Decision Committee of the National Assembly for Wales, chaired by Carwyn Jones, Minister for Environment, Planning and Countryside, approved the application on 24 January 2006.

The minister in turn wrote to Winckworth Sherwood on 31 January. The order, called the Pontypool and Blaenavon Railway (Phase I) Order 2006 (SI 2006/1691) was finally made on 20 June 2006 and came into force on 21 June 2006.

The route southwards was made difficult by the need to refurbish a number of bridges en route. A substantial report issued by the Company to Torfaen County Borough Council, the successor to the Welsh Development Agency, and other interested parties, estimated the lowest cost for the extension and the provision of a minimal station at High Level at between £235K and £395K, with cost of the bridges lying between £162K and £323K—by far the dominant item in the total cost.

The company eventually achieved funding from the Welsh Assembly Government's Heads of the Valleys programme to meet much of the refurbishment costs. Blaenavon (High Level) station is close to the centre of Blaenavon town centre, and as a result, a substantial increase in passenger numbers is confidently expected. Blaenavon is the centre of the World Heritage Site of the Blaenavon Industrial Landscape, which includes Big Pit National Coal Museum and Blaenavon Ironworks.

The presence of the railway there is expected to significantly add to the visitor experience and tourist potential of the town.

With phase 1 achieved, the railway constructed a branch line into the National Mining Museum in 2011 before turning towards extending the line northwards, under a small road bridge and along the still intact track bed to Waunafon, the summit of the line which at 1,400 feet (430 m) above sea level was the highest standard-gauge station in both England and Wales.

There is also growing political interest for the preserved line to extend further again to Brynmawr which takes the railway over the local authority boundary from Torfaen into Blaenau Gwent and also the historic county boundary from Monmouthshire into Brecknockshire. However the emphasis with the local authority is that this phase will serve as a community link, rather than a tourist attraction.

On 10 September 2021, a new locomotive shed was opened.

== Future expansion ==
With extensions southwards to Varteg and beyond, it has been found that the deck of Varteg Road bridge was beyond economical repair, and could not simply be refurbished as was the case with the other bridges on the line. The local authority replaced the deck with two new bridges, one for the railway, and the other for the cycleway in April 2011.

As of 2009 it was impossible to advance more than about 400 yards (370 m) before coming into conflict with the cycleway. Torfaen County Borough Council has recognised the railway's potential to expand towards Talywain and have included this within their local development plan. This will also allow for route sharing to accommodate both Cycle Route and future line proposals whilst ensuring measures are taken to minimise any conflict occurring in dual operation.

Southward expansions to Wainfelin may be jeopardised by recent land reclamation schemes presented by Spring UR Ltd. These plans require the destruction of the Big Arch, a brick-lined tunnel structure built in 1879 which is a Grade II listed structure. The plans opt for its demolition in order to breach the disused railway embankment, in order to create a wider access route for heavy road traffic for open-casting west of Talywain village to commence. This would not only prevent future line extensions but also impede the Celtic Trail cycle path. As of 2008 these proposals were still in the early stages of public meetings.

After Pontypool (Wainfelin), any further restoration of the original route down the valley is now virtually impossible as the line through Pontypool to Newport via Clarence Street was lost in the 1980s to the construction of the A4043 bypass. Retail development such as Tesco now occupies the site of Pontypool Crane Street station; however, the preservation society managed to rescue the up-platform station building by deconstructing it brick-by-brick and storing it for eventual re-construction. As of January 2014, the stonework has been used to decorate the new station building at Furnace Sidings.

== Appearance in popular culture ==
The railway has been used in various episodes for the BBC series The Indian Doctor.

== Motive power ==
Main reference

=== Steam locomotives ===
- Andrew Barclay 0-4-0ST "Rosyth No. 1" built in 1914. Stored awaiting overhaul from 2024.
- W.G. Bagnall 0-6-0ST No. 3061 'Empress' built in 1954. Previous overhaul completed in 2014. Purchased from Mangapps Railway Museum in September 2018. Withdrawn for overhaul in 2022.
- Hunslet 0-6-0ST No. 1873 'Jessie' built in 1937. Operational. Moved from the Llangollen Railway and converted from Thomas the Tank Engine in early 2019. Returned to steam in 2024 and purchased from private owner by the railway in 2026.
- Hunslet Austerity 0-6-0ST No. WD71515 "Mech Navvies" built in 1945. Withdrawn September 2018, overhaul started July 2019.
- Andrew Barclay 0-6-0ST No. 2074 "Llantarnam Abbey" built in 1939. Returned to steam in 2026.
- Andrew Barclay 0-4-0ST No. 1260 "Forester" built in 1911. Donated by Newport City Council, it had previously been on static display in Newport. Undergoing overhaul off site at Williton on the West Somerset Railway
- 1680 Avonside Engine Company 0-6-0ST 'Sir John' built 1914 - Owned by Vale of Neath Railway. Stored awaiting overhaul.

=== Diesel locomotives ===
- BR Co-Co Class 37 No. 37 216 (D6916) Nearing end of restoration back into early BR green.
- BR Co-Co Class 37 No. 37 023 (D6723) Undergoing Restoration.
- BR Co-Co Class 37 No. 37 029 (D6729) Undergoing Restoration.
- BR Co-Co Class 31 No. 31 203 (D5627) 'Steve Organ G.M' operational in early BR green
- Hudswell Clarke 0-4-0DH No. 1344. Operational.
- John Fowler & Co. 0-6-0 No. RT1. Undergoing Restoration
- Hunslet 0-8-0DH No. 170 "Ebbw". Undergoing restoration.
- Hunslet 0-6-0DM No. 5511. Operational.
- Wickham 6947. Undergoing Restoration

=== Diesel multiple units ===
- BR Class 117 DMS No. 51351. Stored unserviceable
- BR Class 117 DMS No. 51397. Undergoing restoration. In lined green livery

== Burglary ==
After the railway's 2018 four-day Halloween event which attracted more than 4,000 visitors, a burglary occurred resulting in £14,000 being stolen in one night along with hundreds of pounds worth of damage to glass. The safe in the station building at Blaenavon was ripped from the floor and taken hours after volunteers had finished locking up on Wednesday night. The crime scene was discovered the next morning. The railway set up a fundraiser, which as of 2 November 2018 had raised more than £6,000.

== See also ==
- List of closed railway stations in Britain
- List of closed railway lines in Great Britain
