= Grade II* listed buildings in Torfaen =

Torfaen shown within Wales

In the United Kingdom, the term listed building refers to a building or other structure officially designated as being of special architectural, historical, or cultural significance; Grade II* structures are those considered to be "particularly important buildings of more than special interest". Listing was begun by a provision in the Town and Country Planning Act 1947. Once listed, strict limitations are imposed on the modifications allowed to a building's structure or fittings. In Wales, the authority for listing under the Planning (Listed Buildings and Conservation Areas) Act 1990 rests with Cadw.

== Buildings ==
Name	Location Grid Ref. (Note: Sometimes known as OSGB36, the grid reference is based on the British national grid reference system used by the Ordnance Survey.) Geo-coordinates	Date Listed	Function	Notes	Reference Number	Image
Church of Saint Peter, Henllys	Henllys; ST2677191038; 51°36′48″N 3°03′32″W	3 January 1963	Church	Situated in a rural location some 2.8km south of the old village at Henllys.	2915	See more images
The Shell Grotto, Pontypool Park	Trevethin; SO2933401028; 51°42′13″N 3°01′26″W	7 February 1962	Grotto	At the summit of the hill in the north east corner of Pontypool Park.	3112	See more images
Church of St Michael and All Angels	New Inn; SO3013301101; 51°42′16″N 3°00′45″W	7 February 1962	Church	Situated at the bottom of the 'Pitch' next to the Horse & Jockey public house.	3114	See more images
Crane Street Baptist Church	Pontymoile; SO2810400928; 51°42′09″N 3°02′30″W	7 February 1962	Church	In Pontypool town centre backing onto Pontypool Market.	3118	See more images
Pontypool Museum	Pontymoile; SO2826701058; 51°42′13″N 3°02′22″W	7 February 1962	Museum	To the north of Pontypool town centre and immediately to the west of Pontypool Park house, now St Alban's RC School.	3120	See more images
St Michael's Church, Llantarnam	Llantarnam; ST3069793155; 51°37′59″N 3°00′10″W	5 January 1951	Church	In a churchyard on the SE side of Newport Road some 140m SW of its junction with Llantarnam Road.	3121	See more images
Pentre-Bach and attached outbuildings	Llantarnam; ST2855492075; 51°37′23″N 3°02′00″W	6 June 1962	Farmhouse	Reached via a track N off Pentre Lane on the W side of Llantarnam.	3126	Pentre-Bach and attached outbuildings
Llanyrafon	Llanyrafon; ST3032894587; 51°38′45″N 3°00′30″W	3 April 1952	Farmhouse	17th century gentry house.	3140	Llanyrafon
Church of All Saints, Ponthir	Ponthir; ST3203793628; 51°38′14″N 2°59′00″W	22 January 1981	Church	In a rural location on the NE side of Llanfrechfa some 300m E of the junction of Church Road and the B4236.	3142	See more images
Former St Peter's School, Blaenavon (now the Blaenavon World Heritage Centre)	Blaenavon; SO2506408825; 51°46′23″N 3°05′15″W	4 July 1989	School	Situated half way up Church Road immediately downhill from the other St Peter's school buildings and with south-east front facing the churchyard. Below the level of the road and set back behind iron railings on dwarf walls.	3150	See more images
Former British Ironworks office and foundry quadrangle	Abersychan; SO2572203624; 51°43′35″N 3°04′37″W	13 September 1994	Office	The most prominent building in the area of the former British Ironworks, about 1000m south west of St Thomas's Church, Talywain.	14870	Former British Ironworks office and foundry quadrangle
St Peter's Church, Blaenavon	Blaenavon; SO2512408778; 51°46′22″N 3°05′12″W	2 September 1995	Church	Situated at the bottom of Church Road, on the south side, set back behind railings.	15273	See more images
Pit head building, headframe and tram circuit, Big Pit National Coal Museum	Blaenavon; SO2389108762; 51°46′20″N 3°06′16″W	2 September 1995	Pit Head	Situated at the north-east edge of the site.	15280	See more images
Miners' baths and canteen, Big Pit National Coal Museum	Blaenavon; SO2372008733; 51°46′19″N 3°06′25″W	2 September 1995	Mine Baths	Situated at the top of the site to the south-west.	15290	See more images
Entrance Gates to Pontypool Park	Trevethin; SO2905900518; 51°41′56″N 3°01′40″W	29 May 1997	Gates	The entrance on to the main drive from Pontymoel at the very south east extremity of Pontypool Park, at a bend in the road.	18466	See more images
1 Forge Row	Abersychan; SO2703906558; 51°45′11″N 3°03′30″W	5 September 1973	Cottage	Situated at the base of a steep hillside, on the east bank of Afon Lwyd about 40m south of Cwmavon House. Rubble forecourt wall.	3133	1 Forge Row
2 Forge Row	Abersychan; SO2704006547; 51°45′10″N 3°03′30″W	5 September 1973	Cottage	Situated at the base of a steep hillside, on the east bank of Afon Lwyd about 40m south of Cwmavon House. Rubble forecourt wall.	18586	2 Forge Row
3 Forge Row	Abersychan; SO2704106538; 51°45′10″N 3°03′30″W	5 September 1973	Cottage	Situated at the base of a steep hillside, on the east bank of Afon Lwyd about 40m south of Cwmavon House. Rubble forecourt wall.	18587	3 Forge Row
4 Forge Row	Abersychan; SO2704206529; 51°45′10″N 3°03′30″W	5 September 1973	Cottage	Situated at the base of a steep hillside, on the east bank of Afon Lwyd about 40m south of Cwmavon House. Rubble forecourt wall.	18588	4 Forge Row
5 Forge Row	Abersychan; SO2704206520; 51°45′09″N 3°03′30″W	5 September 1973	Cottage	Situated at the base of a steep hillside, on the east bank of Afon Lwyd about 40m south of Cwmavon House. Rubble forecourt wall.	18589	5 Forge Row
6 Forge Row	Abersychan; SO2704306510; 51°45′09″N 3°03′30″W	5 September 1973	Cottage	Situated at the base of a steep hillside, on the east bank of Afon Lwyd about 40m south of Cwmavon House. Rubble forecourt wall.	18590	6 Forge Row
Llantarnam Abbey	Llantarnam; ST3115192913; 51°37′51″N 2°59′46″W	6 June 1962	Country House	In extensive grounds on the E side of Llantarnam. Approached along a drive E from Newport Road under the Cwmbran By-pass.	85246	See more images
Former Nylon Spinners Factory	New Inn; SO3084902365; 51°42′57″N 3°00′08″W	17 October 2005	Factory	A prominent landscape feature, at the south end of the Mamhilad Park Industrial Estate.	85438	Former Nylon Spinners Factory

== See also ==
- Listed buildings in Wales
- Grade II* listed buildings in Monmouthshire
- Grade II* listed buildings in Newport
- Grade II* listed buildings in Caerphilly County Borough
- Grade II* listed buildings in Blaenau Gwent
- Grade I listed buildings in Torfaen
- Scheduled Monuments in Torfaen
