= St Cadocs and Penygarn =

Electoral ward in Wales

Coordinates: 51.711°N 3.040°W

Saint Cadocs and Penygarn is an electoral ward in the county borough of Torfaen in south east Wales.

== Description ==
Saint Cadocs is quite small and holds Saint Cadocs parish church in it. Penygarn is divided into housing estate areas and Old Penygarn, one of the richest places in Pontypool. There are only about 15–20 houses in old Penygarn. Penygarn is semi-rural and is close to American Gardens, Pontypool Park.

The ward was elected one councillor to Torfaen County Borough Council between the 1995 and 2017 county borough elections, represented by a mix of Labour Party and Independent councillors. The ward covered the St Cadocs and Penygarn wards of the Community of Trevethin.

Following a 2021 boundary review, the ward was combined with the Trevithin ward to cover the whole of the Trevithin community, with the new ward being called Trevethin and Penygarn.
