= Allen Forward =

Wales international rugby union player (1921–1994)

- Born: Allen Forward; 4 June 1921 Cwmavon, Wales
- Died: 1 January 1994 (aged 72) Newport, Wales
- School: Varteg School; Abersychan Grammar Technical School
- Occupation: Police officer

Rugby union career
- Position: Flanker
Amateur team(s)
Years	Team	Apps	(Points)
- Blaenavon RFC
–	Pontypool RFC		
–	Monmouth Police RFC		
–	Welsh Police RFC		
–	British Police RFC		
–	Barbarian F.C.		
International career
Years	Team	Apps	(Points)
1951–1952	Wales	6	(0)

Allen Forward (4 June 1921 – 1 January 1994) was a Welsh rugby union forward who favoured the position of flanker. Forward played club rugby for Pontypool and various Police teams. He played in six internationals for Wales and was part of the 1952 Grand Slam winning side. Forward also played for an invitational touring team, the Barbarians, and twice met international opposition for Pontypool: South Africa in 1951 and New Zealand in 1954.

== Personal history ==
Forward was born in the village of Cwmavon near Pontypool in 1921 to Edwin and Sarah (née Allen). He was the second eldest of nine children and was educated at nearby Varteg School, before attending Abersychan Grammar Technical School. He entered the police force, and retired a police sergeant.

== Rugby career ==
Forward came to note as a rugby player as a team member of Pontypool. His favoured position was as a flanker, which is in the forward section. His unusual surname was noted by South African journalist R.K. Stent, who wrote in 1952, "...in the home pack was a forward, called Forward."

Forward was first selected for the Wales national team as part of the 1951 Five Nations Championship, filling the role left by Ray Cale, who had turned professional the previous year. Forward was chosen as a flanker for the second Wales game of the tournament, played away against Scotland. Forward was the only change to the previous team that had easily beaten England two weeks before. Wales crashed to a 19–0 loss to the Scots. Forward was left out for the final two games of the Championship.

During the 1951/52 season, Forward faced the touring South African team twice. His first encounter was as part of a joint Pontypool / Newbridge team that met the Springboks on 18 October 1951. Forward was only one of two internationals in the joint club side, the other being Don Hayward. South Africa won 15–6. His second encounter, playing in his usual role as a flanker, was his second international cap for Wales, and his second international defeat. The game was played at the National Stadium in Cardiff and Wales lost 6–3.

Although Forward had not had the best start to his international career, the 1952 Five Nations Championship would see a reverse in his fortunes as Wales lifted the Championship title and won the Grand Slam. Forward played in all four Wales' games of the tournament as a flanker, with wins over England (8–6) and Ireland (14–3) away, and Scotland (11–0) and France (9–5) at home. The France game was Forward's final international appearance. The 1951/52 season also saw him chosen for invitational touring team, the Barbarians, playing in two matches of the tour, against Cardiff and Newport.

After 1952, Forward continued playing rugby at club level, and for the 1953/54 season he was selected as captain of the senior Pontypool side. He continued in his role as captain, when a joint Pontypool / Cross Keys team was selected to face the 1952/53 touring New Zealand side. Forward was the only international cap in the joint side, which lost to the All Blacks 19–6. During the second half of the match Forward was almost on the score sheet with a try, when he pounced on a cross kick in the All Blacks area; but the referee disallowed it.

Forward not only played rugby for Pontypool, but as a police officer, also represented several Police rugby teams. He played at county level for the Monmouth Police, and at country-wide level with the Wales Police and British Police teams.

=== International matches played ===
Wales

- England 1952
- France 1952
- Ireland 1952
- Scotland 1951, 1952
- South Africa 1951

== Bibliography ==
- Griffiths, John (1987). The Phoenix Book of International Rugby Records. London: J. M. Dent & Sons Ltd. ISBN 0-460-07003-7.
- Jenkins, John M.; et al. (1991). Who's Who of Welsh International Rugby Players. Wrexham: Bridge Books. ISBN 1-872424-10-4.
- Smith, David; Williams, Gareth (1980). Fields of Praise: The Official History of The Welsh Rugby Union. Cardiff: University of Wales Press. ISBN 0-7083-0766-3.
- Stent, R.K. (1952). The Fourth Springboks 1951-1952. London: Longmans, Green and Co.
