= Trevethin Community School =

School in Penygarn, Wales

Coordinates: 51.7069°N 3.0381°W

- Welsh: Ysgol Gymunedol Trefddyn

Information
- Established: 1982
- Closed: 2007

Trevethin Community School (Welsh: Ysgol Gymunedol Trefddyn) was a non-selective state secondary school in the Pontypool suburb of Penygarn, Wales.

The school—established in 1982 as Trevethin Comprehensive School—was originally housed on two sites, the former Pontypool Girls' Grammar School building and the former Trevethin Secondary Modern School, which is now the Welsh-language school Ysgol Gyfun Gwynllyw. This was until 1991, when years 7 and 8 moved to the former girls' school in Penygarn, uniting the school on one site and making way for the Welsh-language school.

The school suffered from declining pupil numbers in its last years and closed in the summer of 2007. The remaining pupils were relocated to either Abersychan Comprehensive School or West Monmouth School. Many residents of Trevethin were bitter about the school's closure and fought hard to keep it open, but to no avail. Trevethin itself is an economically deprived district of Pontypool and this influenced the school's fate.
