= John Hanbury (1744–1784) =

British politician (1744–1784)

- Born: 6 August 1744
- Died: 6 April 1784 (aged 39)
- Children: 3
- Parent(s): Capel Hanbury; Jane Tracy
- Relatives: John Hanbury (paternal grandfather); Thomas, 5th Viscount Tracy(maternal grandfather)

John Hanbury (6 August 1744 – 6 April 1784) was a British heir and politician who sat in the House of Commons from 1766 to 1784.

== Early life ==
John Hanbury was born in 1744. His father, Capel Hanbury served as the Member of Parliament for Leominster. His mother was Jane Tracy. His paternal grandfather was John Hanbury, while his maternal grandfather was Thomas Tracy, 5th Viscount Tracy. His great grandfather, Capel Hanbury (1625–1704), began the building of Pontypool Park House in 1659, where he grew up at Pontypool Park in Wales.

His family was responsible for the industrialisation and urbanisation of the eastern valley through which runs the Afon Llwyd (in English "grey river") in Monmouthshire around Pontypool.

== Career ==
Hanbury was MP for Monmouthshire from 1765 until 1785, before a writ was issued for a by-election.

== Personal life and death ==
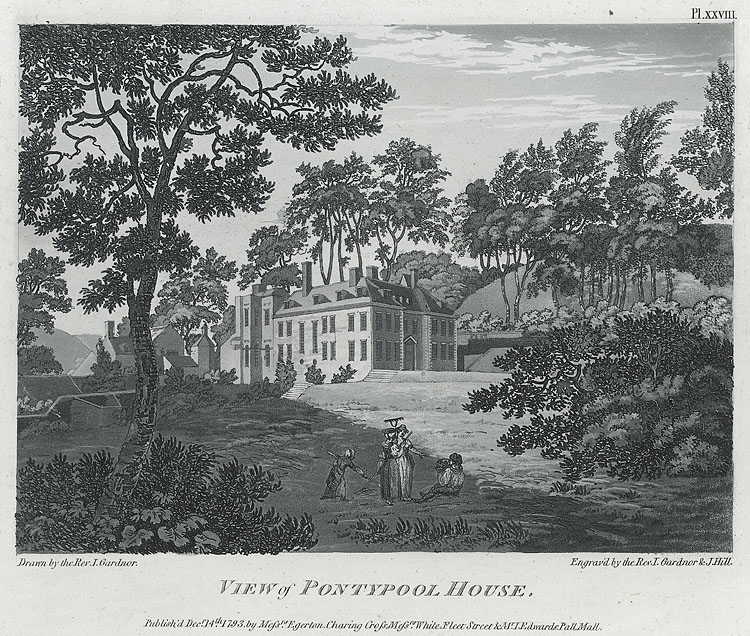
Pontypool House, 1793

Hanbury lived in the manor-house of Hoarstone in Pontypool Park (which now houses St. Alban's R.C. High School and Pontypool Museum). He also built the Shell Grotto, Pontypool and Folly Tower above Pontypool Park. With his wife, he had issue:

- John Capel Hanbury
- Capel Hanbury - later he took the name of Hanbury-Leigh
- Charles Hanbury-Tracy was created Baron Sudeley.

Hanbury died in 1784, aged 39.

Parliament of Great Britain
Preceded by Thomas Morgan, the Younger; Capel Hanbury	Member of Parliament for Monmouthshire; With: Thomas Morgan, the Younger; John Morgan	Succeeded by John Morgan; Henry, Viscount Nevill
