= Clatworthy (surname) =

Clatworthy is a surname. Notable people with the surname include:

- Menna Clatworthy, British immunologist
- Fred Payne Clatworthy (1875–1953), American photographer
- Jodie Clatworthy (born 1972), Australian swimmer
- Robert Clatworthy (art director) (1911–1992), American art director
- Robert Clatworthy (sculptor) (1928–2015), British sculptor
- W. H. Clatworthy (1915–2010), American mathematician
