= Colin Standing =

Welsh rugby league footballer

Personal information
- Full name: Colin J. Standing
- Born: 30 May 1942 Bridgend, Wales
- Died: 18 May 2026 (aged 83) Bridgend, Wales

Playing information
- Height: 6 ft 2 in (1.88 m)
- Weight: 14 st 10 lb (93 kg)

Rugby union
- Position: Number Eight
Club
Years	Team	Pld	T	G	FG	P
1963–67	Bridgend RFC

Rugby league
- Position: Second-row
Club
Years	Team	Pld	T	G	FG	P
1967–69	Wigan	18	2	0	0	6
1969–70	Oldham	4	0	0	0	0
1970	Warrington	1	0	0	0	0
	Total	23	2	0	0	6
Representative
Years	Team	Pld	T	G	FG	P
1969–70	Wales	2

Colin Standing (30 May 1942 – 18 May 2026) was a Welsh rugby union, and professional rugby league footballer in the 1960s and 1970s. He played club level rugby union (RU) for Bridgend RFC, as a number eight, and representative level rugby league (RL) for Wales, and at club level for Wigan, Oldham and Warrington, as a second-row.

== Background ==
Colin Standing's birth was registered in Bridgend, Wales.

== Playing career ==
=== International honours ===
Standing won two caps for Wales (RL) while at Wigan and Oldham in 1969–1970.

=== Notable tour matches ===
Standing played number eight for the combined Bridgend-Maesteg XV in the 12-23 defeat by Fiji during the 1964 Fiji rugby union tour of Europe and Canada at Brewery Field on Saturday 12 September 1964. A quote in the programme of this game. Colin Standing (Bridgend) " No. 8. Aged 21 years. 6ft 2ins. Joined Bridgend 1961-62. Former clubs - Tondu, Cefn Cribbwr, London University. Full back until 18 years old. Glamorgan County and Welsh Trials reserve. One of the outstanding young players in the side. Good handler of the ball, powerful runner, and a natural athlete. No. 8 player that will reach the top. Industrial Chemistry Student."
