= Cwmavon, Torfaen =

Coordinates: 51.752942°N 3.058364°W

Cwmavon: Welsh: Cwmafon
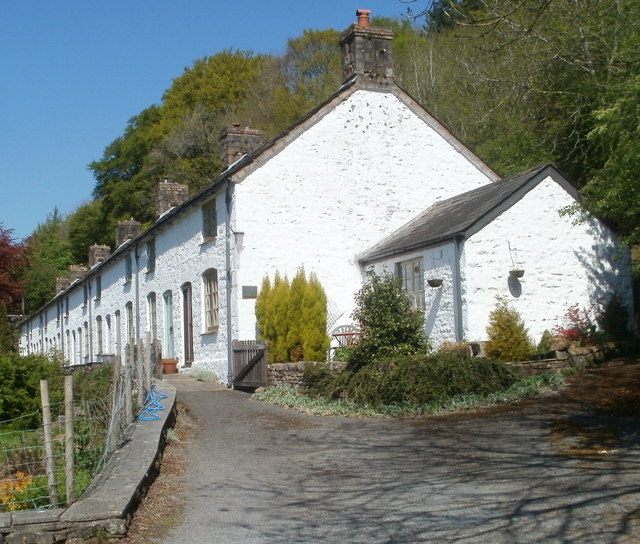
- Forge Row Cottages

- Location within Torfaen
- OS grid reference: SO 27039 06557
- Community: Abersychan
- Principal area: Torfaen
- Preserved county: Gwent
- Country: Wales
- Sovereign state: United Kingdom
- Post town: PONTYPOOL
- Postcode district: NP4
- Dialling code: 01495
- Police: Gwent
- Fire: South Wales
- Ambulance: Welsh
- UK Parliament: Torfaen
- Senedd Cymru – Welsh Parliament: Torfaen

Cwmavon (Welsh: Cwmafon, lit. 'river valley') is a hamlet about 2 miles south of Blaenavon and 4 miles north of Pontypool. The hamlet is part of the community of Abersychan in the county borough of Torfaen in south east Wales, and is within the boundaries of the historic county of Monmouthshire.

Cwmavon is in the south of the Blaenavon Industrial Landscape (a World Heritage Site), the Blaenavon Landscape of Outstanding Historic Interest, and in the Cwmavon Conservation Area.

== Geography ==
The scattered settlement lies in the steep wooded valley of the Afon Llwyd. The agricultural landscape, with irregular field patterns, scattered farmsteads, woodlands, sheep folds, limestone quarries and kilns is typical of the medieval and post-medieval mixed agriculture in the wider region.

The Afon Llwyd is at the eastern edge of the South Wales coalfield, so no coal mining took place in Cwmavon. However, the western side of the valley, in areas such as Varteg and Garndiffaith, included coal mines and ironworks.

== Industrialisation ==
In 1793 the Blaenavon Railroad (a horse drawn tramroad) was completed to link Blaenavon Ironworks with the Monmouthshire Canal. The engineer for both the tramroad and canal was Thomas Dadford, Jr for the Monmouthshire Canal Company. The connection between the canal and tramroad at Pontnewynydd was completed in 1875 and the canal opened in February 1876 for shipping of goods from the ironworks to the port of Newport. A branch was built to connect the nearby Varteg Ironworks (founded in 1802) to the railroad at Cwmavon.

In 1806 a forge was built near the Afon Lwyd to serve the ironworks. At about the same time a row of twelve cottages (Forge Row, Cwmavon) were built for the workers of the forge. The forge closed later but was revived in 1823, and Cwmavon House was built (sometime between 1825 and 1835) about 40m north of Forge Row for Mr Partridge, owner the forge. The forge closed in 1840 and many of the workers moved away.

In 1845 the Monmouthshire Canal Company obtained an Act of Parliament to improve the Blaenavon Railroad and connect it to a new railway to Newport under the control of a new company, the Newport and Pontypool Railway. In 1848, after slow progress on building, the railway company was taken over by the canal company to form the Monmouthshire Railway and Canal Company. The section from Newport to Pontypool was opened in June 1852, but the northern connection to Blaenavon could not be completed until part of the old canal had been drained. The completed line opened in 1854.

In 1860 Varteg Collery opened and an incline linked the colliery to Cwmavon railway station.

Sometime in the 3rd quarter of the 19th century, a file factory opened on the site of the Cwmavon Forge and a house was built nearby.

Cwmavon Reservoir was built in the late 19th century by the Pontypool Gas and Water Company to supply water to Abersychan, and also supplies the village. The reservoir is fed by a spring at its northern end. In 1906 two bodies were discovered in the reservoir in two separate incidents.

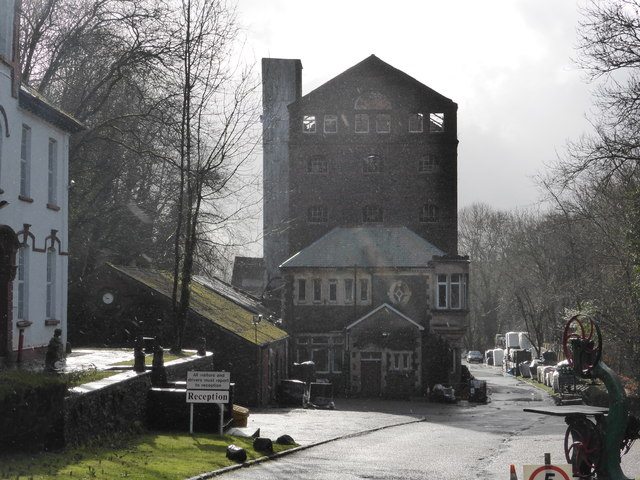
The Old Brewery, Cwmavon - site of much of the work of the Eastern Valley SPS

In 1900 a new brewery for Westlake's of Blaenavon was built in Cwmavon. The site was chosen as the geology of the Afon Lwyd changes nearby to limestone with springs feeding the river, ensuring a good supply of clean water. The design of the five-storey building, by George Adlam & Sons, was acclaimed at the time by the Brewers Journal saying "the plant will be of the most modern description, both scientifically and practically." With its polychromatic tower it was one of Adlam's more flamboyant designs. The site also includes a substantial two storey house with five bays for the manager. By 1907 the brewery had a chain of public houses and in 1911 took over the Castle Brewery in Pontypool.

In 1936 the Old Brewery at Cwmavon was bought and became the main centre of activities of the Brynmawr Experiment, an effort led by Peter Scott to address issues of poverty and unemployment in Brynmawr, South Wales, between 1929 and 1939. At Beili Glas behind the old Brewery in Cwmavon pigs were kept and a small quarry opened for stone.

Initially a relief project response of the Quakers in South-East England, it grew first into an effort to set up small industries and finally an ambitious utopian subsistence agriculture project for unemployed workers, The Subsistence Production Societies. The concept was that in return for voluntary work for the project, members would be able to buy goods and produce more cheaply, and from 1936 unemployed insured workers could continue to collect "dole" payments if they volunteered for the SPS and were available for work if any came available.

At the peak in 1937 there were 400 men in the society, about 9% of the unemployed men registered at the Blaenavon and Pontpool labour exchange at the time. It was decided to expand to form a second SPS with the purchase of two farms nearer Brynmawr and the opening of a coal level. From May 1936 Bauhaus teacher Ludwig Hirschfeld-Mack was employed there in the carpentry workshop before being deported to Australia in 1940 as an 'enemy alien'. His drawing of the brewery is held in the University of Melbourne art collection.

== Transport ==
The A4043 road passes through Cwmavon. An hourly bus service (operated by Phil Anslow Coaches) runs Monday to Saturday in daytime between Blaenavon, Pontypool and Cwmbran. There are stops at the reservoir, bridge, and community centre.

The National Cycle Network route 492 passes to the west of Cwmavon. The traffic-free route (part of the Torfaen Leisure Route) is open to walkers, and also horse-riders (Pontypool to Garn Lakes, Blaenavon only).

== Amenities ==
The village population is very low, but there is a public house close to the village. The other of Cwmavon's pubs, The Westlakes, named after the former brewery of the same name that is nearby. The Westlakes pub was closed 6 years ago and now the nearest one is The Rising Sun in Abersychan or The Crown in the Varteg. The new Cwmavon Village Hall was built nearly 6 years ago.

== Recognition and conservation ==
In 1973 the 12 cottages at Forge Row (by now converted into 6 cottages) were designated as Grade II* listed buildings. The cottages were restored in 1989 by the British Historic Buildings Trust and the National Trust.

The Cwmavon Conservation Area was designated in 1994 by Torfaen Borough Council. The Blaenavon Landscape of Outstanding Historic Interest was one of the landscapes included when the register was first published in 1998. The Blaenavon Industrial Landscape was added to the World Heritage List by UNESCO in 2000.

== Recreation ==
A three-hour circular walk around Cwmavon highlights the industrial and agricultural heritage of area. The Eastern Valley Heritage Ride (34 miles by bicycle) affords views of Cwmavon from the western side of the valley.. The Chartism Trail is 12 mile car tour around Torfaen with stopping points and optional walks, and downloadable MP3 files with commentaries. One of the stops is Forge Row in Cwmavon.
