= Trevethin =

Trevethin: Welsh: Trefddyn
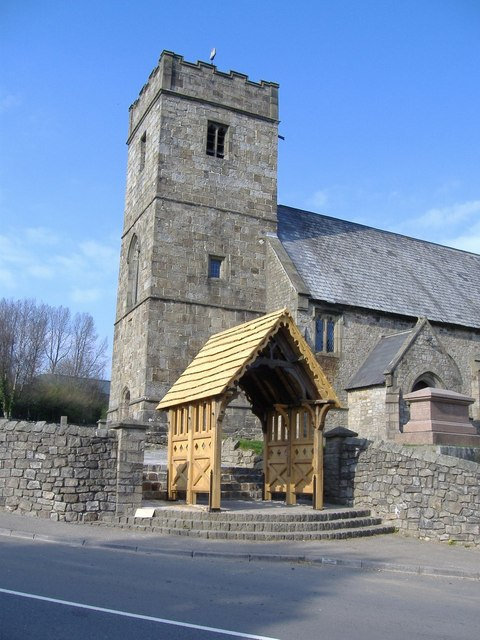
- St Cadoc's Church

- Location within Torfaen
- Area: 4.98 km^{2} (1.92 sq mi)
- Population: 5,147 (2011)
  - Density: 1,034/km^{2} (2,680/sq mi)
- OS grid reference: SO 282 022
- Community: Trevethin
- Principal area: Torfaen
- Preserved county: Gwent
- Country: Wales
- Sovereign state: United Kingdom
- Post town: PONTYPOOL
- Postcode district: NP4
- Dialling code: 01495
- Police: Gwent
- Fire: South Wales
- Ambulance: Welsh
- UK Parliament: Torfaen
- Senedd Cymru – Welsh Parliament: Torfaen
- List of places UK Wales Torfaen 51.713333°N 3.039444°W Map of the community

Trevethin or Trefethin (Welsh: Trefddyn) is a suburb of Pontypool and a community in Torfaen, Wales. The community is coterminous with the electoral ward of Trevethin and Penygarn, which elects councillors to Torfaen County Borough Council. It is in the historic county of Monmouthshire.

== History and amenities ==
Trevethin was a small village that was the seat of the parish of Trevethin in ancient Abergavenny Hundred. It has become a modern suburb, as economic growth led to a construction boom surrounding the village in the 1960s and '70s. Today Trevethin almost imperceptibly merges with nearby Penygarn. In 2005 it was announced that the district's local school, Trevethin Community School, was to close. Pupils were moved to Abersychan comprehensive school and West Monmouth School. The upper-school buildings have since been demolished and a housing estate built on the land. In 1991, Ysgol Gyfun Gwynllyw, a Welsh-medium education secondary school, moved to Trevethin, on the former lower-school site, but in modern buildings. This school has now become a 3-18 school called Ysgol Gymraeg Gwynllyw.

Trevethin is situated in Pontypool and is on the southernmost point of the Brecon Beacons National Park. Near to Trevethin are various famous landmarks including the Folly Tower and Shell Grotto both of which were originally built by the Hanbury family during the 18th century.

Trevethin was part of the Communities First initiative until its closure in 2018. A 2012 Communities First report identified Trevethin as the most deprived community in its cluster of communities, and one of the most deprived in Wales overall.

== Notable people ==
- Morgan Edwards

== Football club ==
Trevethin have a football team, who play in Division Two of the Gwent Central League. According to their website, they play their home games at top pitch, a football pitch near the top of Trevethin.
