= Pen-y-garn =

Pen-y-garn may refer to:

- Pen y Garn - a mountain in Ceredigion
- Penygarn, Torfaen - a village in Torfaen, in the ward of St Cadocs/Penygarn, Wales
- Pen-y-garn, Ceredigion - a village in Ceredigion, Wales
- Pen-y-garn - a former farm near Llanpumsaint, Carmarthenshire, Wales, now part of the area known as Skanda Vale
- Pen-y-Garn, near Pwllheli, Gwynedd
