= St Alban's Roman Catholic High School, Pontypool =

Coordinates: 51°42′13″N 3°02′20″W

St Alban's RC High School
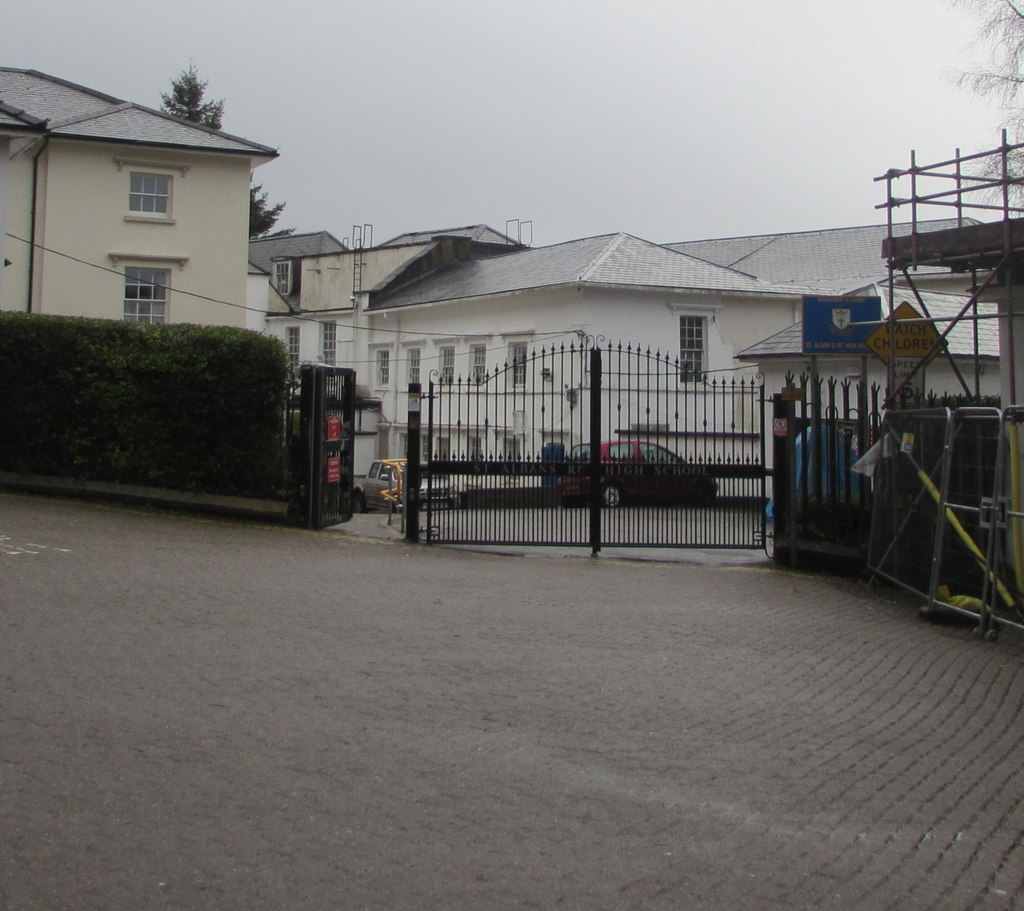

Location
- The Park; Pontypool, Torfaen, NP4 6XG; Wales

Information
- Type: Voluntary aided secondary school
- Motto: Miles Christi Sum (I am a soldier of Christ)
- Religious affiliation: Roman Catholic
- Established: 1924
- Local authority: Torfaen
- Headteacher: Elaine Yates
- Age: 11 to 16
- Enrolment: 1060 (2012)
- Website: http://www.stalbans-pontypool.org.uk

St Alban's RC High School (Welsh: Ysgol Uwchradd Catholig Sain Alban) is a Roman Catholic secondary school in Pontypool, Torfaen, Wales. The school provides education from ages 11–16. The school is situated in Park House, the former home of the Hanbury family in Pontypool Park.

== Park House ==
Built in the late seventeenth century by local ironmaster, Major John Hanbury, the house is in a style popularised by the architect Inigo Jones.

In 1923 the Hanbury family sold the property to the Sisters of the Order of the Holy Ghost. It was initially reopened as a girls' day and boarding school. In 1963, control of the school was passed to the Archdiocese of Cardiff to become St Alban’s RC High School.

In March 2023 - St Albans R.C. High School have opened the doors to its newly refurbished library, thanks to a £1.2 million grant from the Welsh Government.

== 2008 Estyn report ==
According to the Autumn 2008 report by Estyn, the school has a GCSE pass rate of 75% (based on 5 GCSEs, grades A-C) which puts it in equal 17th place in Wales and within the top 10% of secondary schools in Wales. The inspection concluded that: St Alban’s Roman Catholic High School is a very successful school with many outstanding features. Its Christian values pervade its work and are important to all members of the school community.

== Former students ==
- Gareth Maule – Rugby player - Llanelli Scarlets
- Lloyd Burns – Rugby player - Dragons
- Menna Clatworthy - British immunologist who is Professor of Translational Medicine at the University of Cambridge.
- Christian Coleman – Rugby player - Dragons
- Joe Goodchild – Rugby player - Cardiff RFC
- Nick Thomas-Symonds - British Labour Party Politician, barrister and academic - MP for Torfaen, May 2015 – Present
- Kevin Owen - British TV News Anchor - former Senior News Anchor at RT International, Moscow 2006–2022, ex-Sky News, BBC World Service, HTV Wales and West, and BBC Wales.
- Kevin Brennan - British Labour Party Politician, former MP for Cardiff West, 7th June 2001 - 30 May 2024, and member of the House of Lords.
