= Forge Row, Cwmavon =

Forge Row
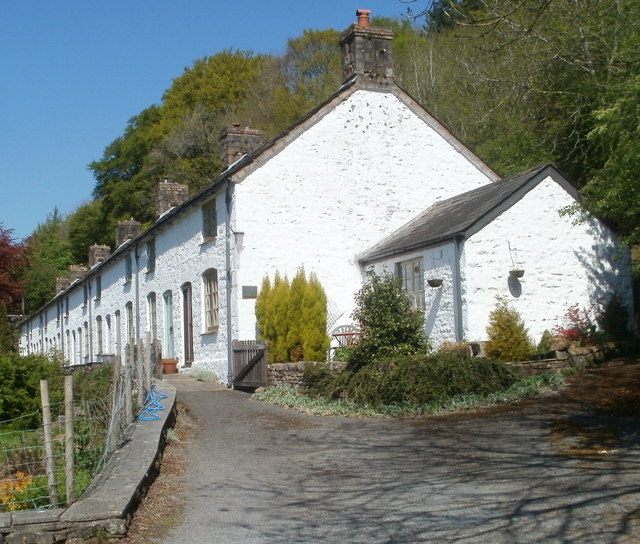
- Side view from the south

- Location within Torfaen

General information
- Coordinates: 51.752942°N 3.058364°W

Listed Building – Grade II*
- Official name: 1–7 Forge Row
- Designated: 9 May 1973
- Reference no.: 3133, 18586-90

Forge Row is a terrace of seven, originally twelve, cottages build around 1804 for workers at a nearby forge in Cwmavon, Torfaen, South East Wales. The cottages have been sympathetically restored. The terrace is regarded as a fine example of early housing for industrial workers in South Wales, and all the cottages are Grade II* listed buildings. The cottages lie to the east of the Afon Llwyd river.

== Building ==
Around 1804 a forge was built at Cwmavon as part of Varteg Ironworks (although the ironmasters of Blaenavon Ironworks also seem to have been involved as the forge was near to the recently completed Blaenavon Railroad).

The row was built for the workers at the forge around 1804-6 as twelve tiny cottages, each only the width of a door and window, with an alternating left and right pattern with shared chimney stacks, so they appear as six cottages.

The cottages each had four rooms on two storeys with the front door opening directly into the kitchen/dining room. Unusually for the time there was also a back door. A winding staircase led to the front bedroom which accessed the back bedroom.

The small size of the cottages contrasts with Cwmavon House, which was built a few years later in 1830 for the manager of the forge. Cwmavon house is a two-storey house with four bays and is about 40 metres (44 yd) north of Forge Row and is a Grade II listed building.

== Occupation ==
The forge closed in 1840 and many of the workers moved away. In 1852 only six of the cottages were occupied, with an average occupation of 4.3 residents.

The row was later bought by the Varteg Hills colliery, on the west of the valley, for its workers and remained fully occupied for many years. A resident of Cwmavon remembers that in the late 1920s No. 5 Forge Row was owned by Mr Llewellyn, the Sunday school superintendent, who ran the cottage as a small shop selling "household goods such as soap, scrubbing brushes and blacklead along with sweets, cigarettes and paraffin". They also remember that Mr. Humphries, the colliery manager, lived at Cwmavon House.

== Decline ==
In 1975 the last resident was rehoused by the local authority and by 1980 the then owners, the National Coal Board, wanted to demolish the row, but the Torfaen Museum Trust bought the buildings to ensure their survival.

== Protection and restoration ==
The six cottages were designated as listed buildings in 1973.

In 1989 restoration of the row was undertaken by the British Historic Buildings Trust and the National Trust with support from Cadw and the Prince of Wales Committee. The original fireplaces and staircases were retained, and extra staircases and downstairs closets were added. The twelve original cottages were combined to create six cottages. The stone walls were whitened and the doors and window frames painted in earth colours. The £200,000 restoration, carried out by Ferguson Mann in 1987-8, retained the original charm of the dwellings while also adding modern facilities. The cost of the restoration was covered by the sale of the cottages. The new owners had to sign covenants to protect the cottages from being spoilt or altered.

Forge Row is further protected as it lies within the Blaenavon Industrial Landscape (a World Heritage Site), the Blaenavon Landscape of Outstanding Historic Interest, and the Cwmavon Conservation Area.

Forge Row is mentioned a number of tourist walks and trails around the area.
