= Pontypool Park =

Park in Pontypool, Torfaen

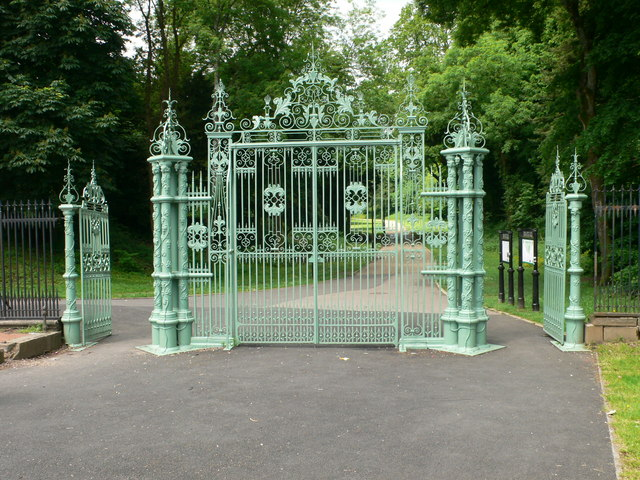
- The Pontymoile Gates - a gift from Sarah Churchill, Duchess of Marlborough

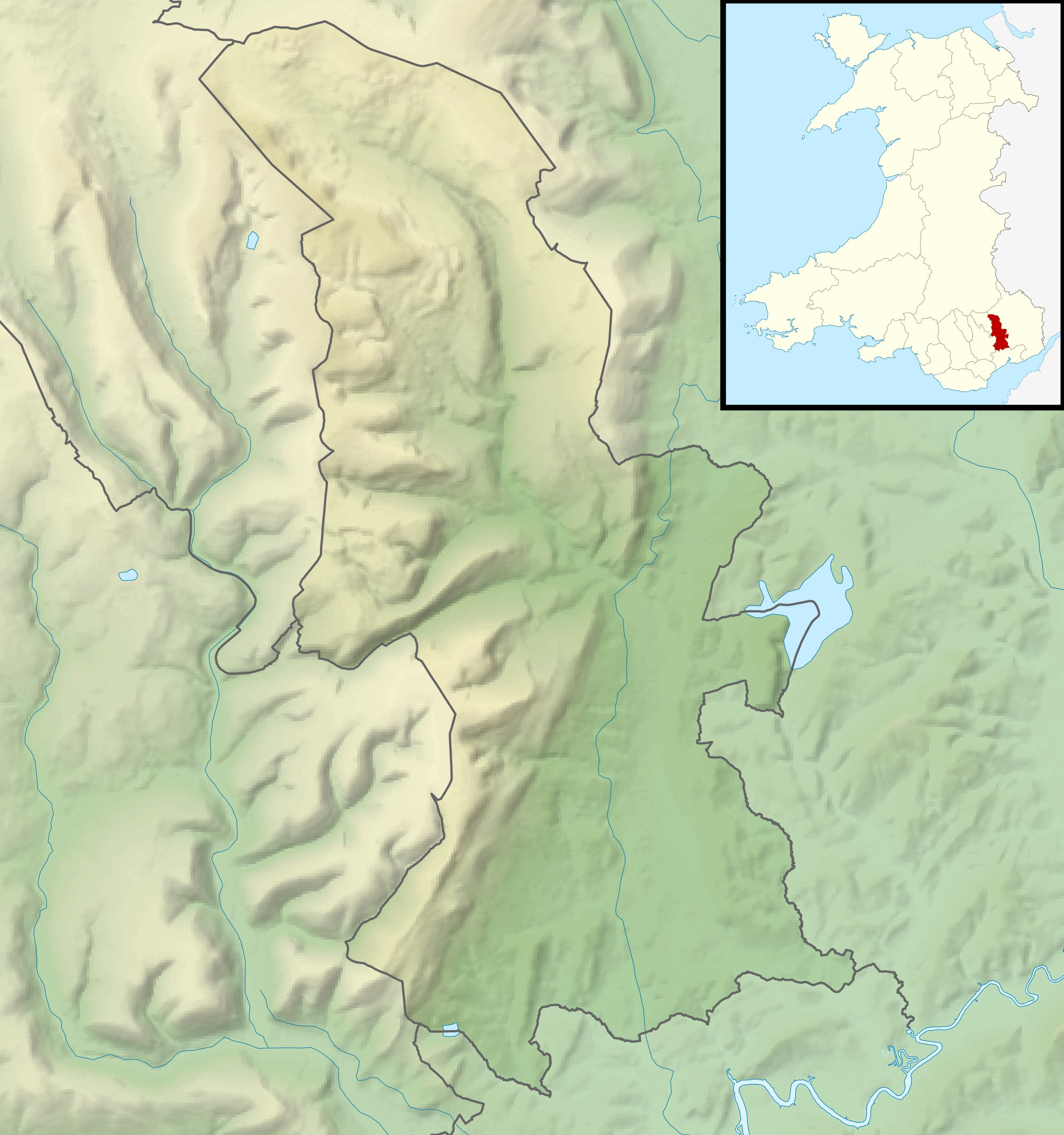
- Location within Torfaen
- 51.7034°N 3.0386°W
- Type: School
- Location: Pontypool, Torfaen

History
- Built: Early 18th century

Listed Building – Grade II
- Official name: St. Alban's R.C. School
- Designated: 2 July 1962
- Reference no.: 3119

Listed Building – Grade II*
- Official name: The Valley Inheritance Museum
- Designated: 2 July 1962
- Reference no.: 3120

Listed Building – Grade II
- Official name: Double icehouse in Pontypool Park
- Designated: 28 August 1997
- Reference no.: 18811

Listed Building – Grade II*
- Official name: Shell Grotto
- Designated: 2 July 1962
- Reference no.: 3122

Listed Building – Grade II*
- Official name: Entrance Gates to Pontypool Park.
- Designated: 29 May 1997
- Reference no.: 18466

Pontypool Park (Welsh: Parc Pont-y-pŵl) is a 150-acre (0.61 km^{2}) park in Pontypool, Torfaen, Wales. The park was formerly the grounds of Pontypool House and was laid out in the closing years of the 17th century for John Hanbury, an ironmaster, who is closely associated with Japanware. The grounds were purchased by the local authority in 1920, while the estate house was leased, and later sold, to the Sisters of the Holy Ghost to become St. Alban's RC High School. The former stables now house the Torfaen Museum. The grounds contain a number of structures including a double ice house, the Folly Tower and the Shell Grotto. The park is entered through the Pontymoile Gates. The gates, the grotto and the stables are all Grade II* listed structures, while the former hall and the ice house are listed Grade II. The park itself is designated at Grade II* on the Cadw/ICOMOS Register of Parks and Gardens of Special Historic Interest in Wales.

== History ==
John Hanbury (1664–1734) had developed the family ironworks at Pontypool into a successful commercial enterprise, and began the creation of the Pontypool Park estate, although nothing of his 17th century house remains. His second wife, Bridget Ayscough, was a close friend of Sarah Churchill, Duchess of Marlborough, and this connection led to Hanbury's appointment as one of the executors of John Churchill's will. The Pontymoile Gates, which now stand at the entrance to the park, were a gift from Sarah, and originally stood between Hanbury's house and the stables, before being moved to their present position in around 1835. They have a Grade II* listing.

The present house at Pontypool Park was developed by John Hanbury (1744–1784) in the late 17th or very early 18th century. Hanbury continued his grandfather's development both of the business and the estate and in around 1762, he built the folly tower as an eyecatcher. His third son, Capel Hanbury, who subsequently appended Leigh to his surname, also worked to enhance the estate. Archdeacon Coxe stayed during his Welsh tours in 1799-1800, and described a visit to the tower in the company of Hanbury-Leigh and his wife: "From this eminence, the wild and fertile parts of Monmouthshire are beautifully combined. No traveller should quit Monmouthshire without enjoying the singular and almost boundless prospect". In the 1830s, Hanbury Leigh undertook a large expansion of the house, doubling its size, the construction of new stables to the northwest of the house, and the Shell Grotto in the park. The stables, which now house the Torfaen Museum, are listed Grade II* on Cadw's historic buildings record.

After the death of John Capel Hanbury in 1921, his daughter Ruth Julia Margarette Hanbury inherited the wider Pontypool Park Estate. After marrying on 18 December 1923 and deciding to raise a family at her husband's Anglo-Irish estate in County Monaghan, Ireland, Ruth sold-off parts of the estate, selling the gardens and park to Pontypool Urban District Council and giving the house to the Roman Catholic Church. The house continues as a school, and the park is maintained by Torfaen County Borough Council.

== Landscape ==
=== Location ===
The park occupies a large area to the east of Pontypool town centre. The main park starts at the Pontymoile Gates near New Inn and Pontymoile Basin, and finishes to the north close to St Alban's RC High School and Torfaen Museum. To the east the land rises to the tower and the grotto. Its western border follows the Afon Lwyd river and Pontypool Leisure Centre, and Italian Gardens are located close to the western periphery. There are landscaped areas such as the Italian Gardens (refurbished in 2006) and the Nant-y-Gollen Ponds (originally one large millpond used to power a forge downstream). Three main avenues divide the park; they all merge at the leisure centre near the park's centre.

=== Features ===
The park is set mostly to open grassland and mixed woodland with many old sweet chestnuts. One of the oldest, a 400-year-old hollow tree, was voted Welsh Tree of the Year for 2019. In 1923, the Gorsedd stone circle was created in time for the park to host the 1924 National Eisteddfod of Wales. The park is listed at Grade II* on the Cadw/ICOMOS Register of Parks and Gardens of Special Historic Interest in Wales.

The Folly Tower is a three-storey tower near the eastern edge of the park. Originally constructed by John Hanbury in 1762, it was demolished during the Second World War, after fears that it would act as a marker for German aircraft. The present tower is a replica, constructed in 1994. A short distance from this folly is the Shell Grotto. Designed by S. Gunston Tit, the structure was commissioned by Capel Hanbury Leigh and built in the 1830s. The garden historian Elisabeth Whittle describes the grotto as a "magnificent survivor". The interior is decorated with shells and bones, reputedly the work of Hanbury Leigh's first wife, Molly Mackworth. Both sites are open to the public at weekends from May to September. Restored in the 1990s, the grotto is a Grade II* listed building.

There is also a double ice house near the old Pontypool House and Torfaen Museum. It has a Grade II listing. There is also a bandstand that forms part of the venue (along with nearby Torfaen Museum) for the annual Jazz in the Park festival.

A second set of gates into the Italian Gardens at the southern edge of the park forms the town's war memorial. They were erected in 1924, following the gift of the gardens to the town of Pontypool in 1920, by Ruth Tenison on her coming of age. They are a Grade II listed structure.

==== Sport ====
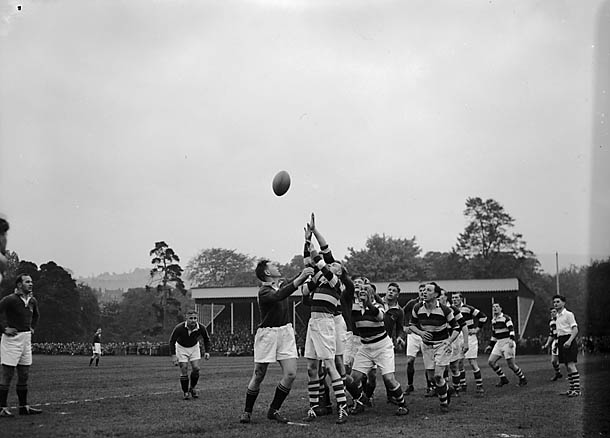
18th October 1951: A large crowd watches the combined Newbridge and Pontypool team plays a rugby match against the visiting South Africa team at Pontypool Park during their tour of Europe.

Pontypool Park has an iconic status within Rugby Union, as the home ground of Pontypool RFC since 1945. While today the capacity at the Park is 8,800, matches would formerly draw crowds of tens of thousands and the venue was considered one of the most feared and famous rugby grounds in the world, hosting touring teams from New Zealand, South Africa and Australia as well as group matches for the 1991 Rugby World Cup. In 2012, Pontypool RFC informed their supporters that they would leave the Park following vandalism of the ground and the clubs own financial difficulties. However new investment plus support from Torfaen County Borough Council, supporters and local businesses saw the club remain at the Park, renovating the stadium as an enclosing ground to prevent further vandalism and creating the "The Ray Prosser Stand".

Pontypool's main leisure centre is located within the park. A dry ski slope was constructed in the park in 1975 and remains in use. The park also has outside tennis and netball courts and a bowling green.

== Gallery ==
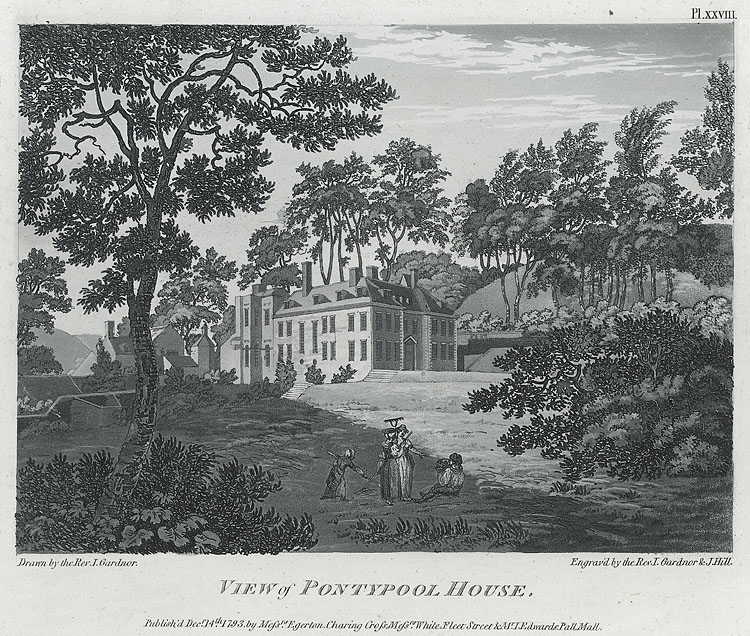
Pontypool House, 1793

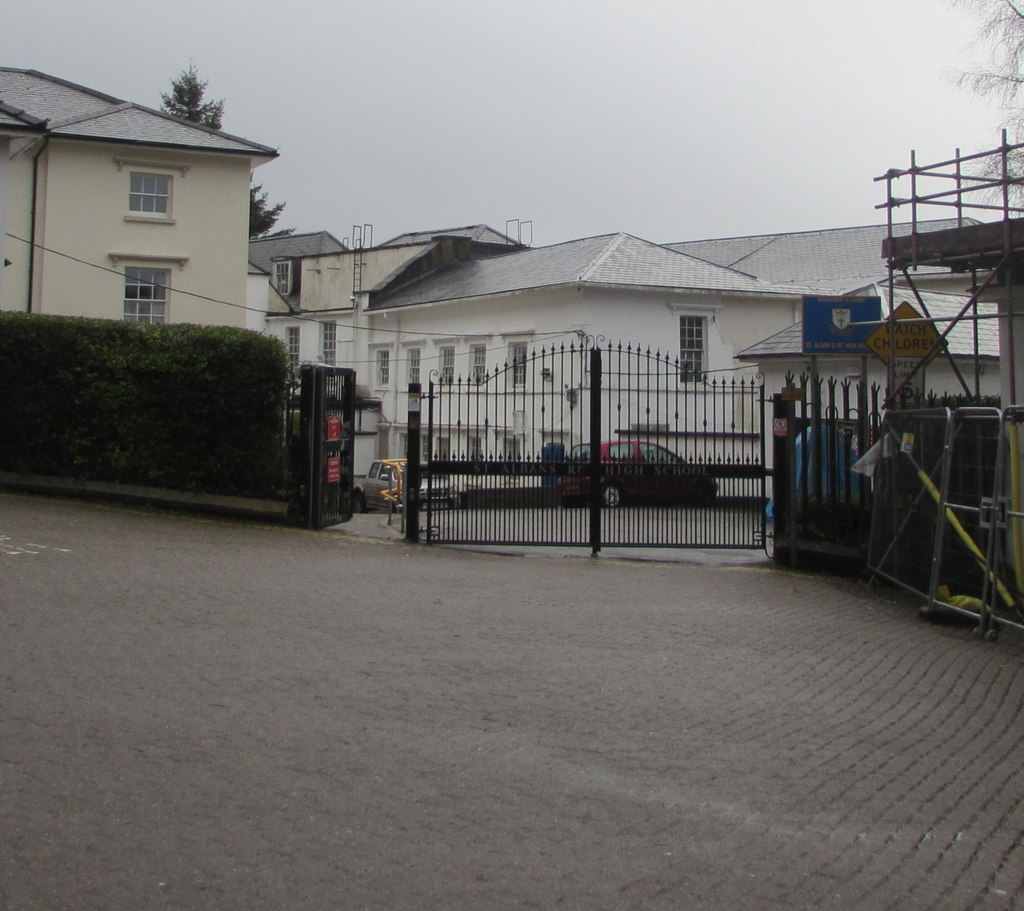
Entrance gates to the former Pontypool Park, now St Alban's Roman Catholic School

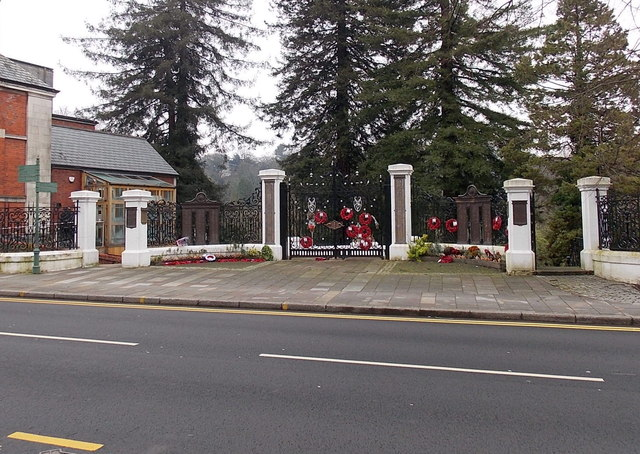
Gates to the Italian Gardens

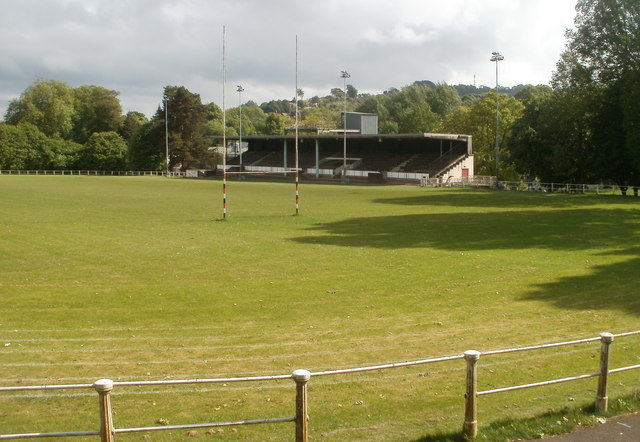
Pontypool Park Rugby Ground, home of Pontypool RFC

== See also ==
- Folly Tower, Pontypool
- Shell Grotto, Pontypool

== Sources ==
- Coxe, William (1995) [1801]. An Historical Tour of Monmouthshire. Vol. 2. Cardiff: Merton Priory Press. ISBN 978-1-8989-3708-1. OCLC 34476778.
- Headley, Gwyn; Meulenkamp, Wim (1999). Follies, Grottoes and Garden Buildings. London: Aurum Press. ISBN 9781854106254. OCLC 1008038820.
- Schubert, John Rudolph Theodore (1957). History of the British iron and steel industry from c. 450 B.C. to A.D. 1775. London: Routledge and Kegan Paul. OCLC 903567183.
- Newman, John (2000). Gwent/Monmouthshire. The Buildings of Wales. London: Penguin. ISBN 0-14-071053-1.
- Whittle, Elisabeth (1992). The Historic Gardens of Wales. Cardiff: CADW. ISBN 9780117015784. OCLC 611958059.
