= Trevethin and Penygarn =

Electoral ward in Torfaen, Wales

Coordinates: 51.714°N 3.037°W

Trevethin and Penygarn (Welsh: Trefddyn a Phenygarn) is an electoral ward in the county borough of Torfaen in south east Wales. Created in 2022, it is coterminous with the community of Trevethin.

== Description ==
Trevethin and Penygarn was created by a 2021 boundary review and The County Borough of Torfaen (Electoral Arrangements) Order 2021, coming into effect from the 2022 Torfaen County Borough Council election in May 2022. The ward elects two councillors to Torfaen County Borough Council.

The ward includes the villages of Trevethin and Penygarn. Trevethin is ranked the 40th most deprived community in Wales, and the most deprived in Torfaen.

== Representatives ==
Sue Malson volunteered as Torfaen Council's 'Gypsy Traveller Champion'. However, in January 2024 the council was made aware of a "sweary video" by Malson on social media, made in response to comments from male trolls. Malson was given advice by the council's monitoring officer. In November 2024 it was announced she had stood down from the council "for her personal wellbeing".

At a by-election in February 2025, Trevethin and Penygarn elected a Reform UK councillor, Stuart Keyte, the first Reform UK councillor elected in Wales.

== Elections ==
=== 2022 ===
Torfaen County Borough Council, 5 May 2022
Party	Candidate	Votes	%	±%
Labour	Sue Malson ^{o}	676		N/A
Labour	Jon Horler	574		N/A
Conservative	Andrew White	215		N/A
Turnout			23	
Labour win (new seat)				
Labour win (new seat)				

^{o} existing councillor, though because of boundary changes not for the same ward

=== 2025 by-election ===
The by-election was caused by the resignation of one of the ward's Labour councillors. Stuart Keyte was the first Reform UK councillor elected in Wales, though Torfaen already had three Reform UK councillors who had originally been elected as Independents.

Trevethin and Penygarn by-election, 13 February 2025
Party	Candidate	Votes	%	±%
Reform UK	Stuart Keyte	457	47.0	N/A
Labour	Toniann Phillips	259	26.6	
Independent	Catherine Howells	117	12.0	N/A
Independent	Louise Shepphard	114	11.7	N/A
Green	Tony Clark	25	2.6	N/A
Majority		198		N/A
Turnout			24.7	+1.7
Reform UK gain from Labour				
