= Ysgol Gymraeg Gwynllyw =

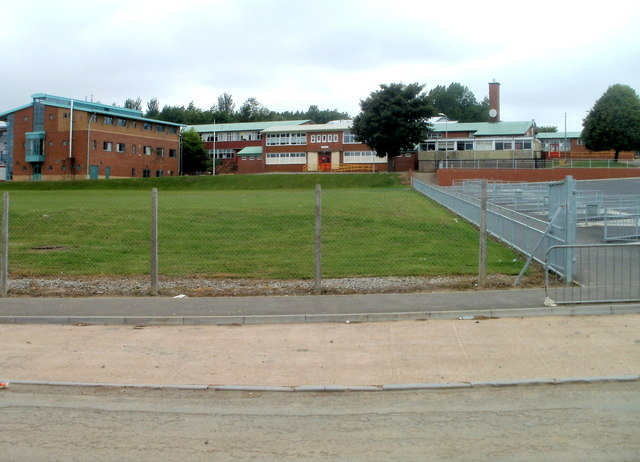

Location
- Heol Folly; Torfaen, NP4 8JD; Wales; 51.7150°N 3.037°W

Information
- Type: Co-educational (Welsh Medium)
- Motto: 1988–2017: "Cerddwn Ymlaen" ("Forward we March"); 2017–present: Bydd pob dysgwr yn llwyddo (Every learner will succeed)
- Established: 1988
- Local authority: Torfaen
- Chair of Governors: Lesley Bush
- Head teacher: Cath Evans
- Staff: 61
- Age: 3 to 19
- Enrollment: 750 (2023)
- Houses: Ebwy; Llwyd; Rhymni; Wysg
- Colours: Green, Navy and Grey
- Website: ysgol-gymraeg-gwynllyw.weebly.com

Ysgol Gymraeg Gwynllyw is a Welsh-medium all-age school located in Trevethin, Pontypool in Torfaen, Wales and named for Saint Gwynllyw. The school had 781 pupils on roll in 2024. The school changed its name from Ysgol Gyfun Gwynllyw to Ysgol Gymraeg Gwynllyw, in 2022, dropping "Comprehensive" and instead highlighting the Welsh language, due to its move from a High School to an all-age school for ages 3 to 18, the first in South East Wales. This area has one of the lowest proportion of Welsh speakers in Wales.

== History ==
The school was founded in 1988 as the first Welsh-medium school in the former Gwent LEA area and is housed in accommodation previously used for Trevethin Comprehensive School.

For its first three years Ysgol Gyfun Gwynllyw was housed in the old Abercarn Infant School house, but it soon outgrew the building. As one of the fastest growing schools in Wales, bigger premises were needed and the old Trevethin upper school was suggested by the education authority. The school is in Trevethin, Pontypool, Torfaen.

Pupils at the school are taught in Welsh and come from a range of Welsh-language feeder schools from four different counties: Torfaen, Blaenau Gwent, Monmouthshire and Newport. The aim is to immerse pupils in Welsh and to enable them to be educated entirely in it as their native language. The number of new pupils enrolled at the school has fallen every year since 2016, when the new Ysgol Gyfun Gwent Is Coed opened in Newport, shrinking the catchment area of Gwynllyw.

An inspection report by Estyn in 2008 stated 94.5% of the pupils came from homes where English is the main language; 5.3% came from Welsh-speaking homes. The same report also said that all pupils speak Welsh as a first language or to an equivalent standard.

A subsequent inspection by Estyn in 2019 placed the school in special measures, with the school rated as "unsatisfactory" overall and "needing urgent improvement" in three of the five areas assessed. This was a fall from its assessed rating of "Good" five years earlier, in 2014.

In 2009 the school was given a grant to make improvements and to replace the majority of the old static cabins with a new complex building. Construction was completed in 2012. In 2018 the school was given £3 million to develop a primary school, and in 2020 the work began on construction, beginning with the demolition of the three remaining static cabins, which stood on the site of the future primary school. The new primary school opened in September 2022 with capacity for 210 students.

== Notable former pupils ==
- Aimee-Ffion Edwards, actress
- Cerys Hale, rugby player
- Luca Hoole, football player
- Matthew Jones, politician
- Lloyd Lewis, Rugby Player and TV presenter
- Steffan Lewis, politician
- Aneurin Owen, rugby player
- Niamh Salkeld, politician
- Omar Taylor-Clarke, football player
