= Terry Shaw (rugby union) =

- Full name: Terence Windsor Shaw
- Born: 9 August 1962 (age 64) Ystrad Mynach, Wales
- Height: 6 ft 5 in (196 cm)

Rugby union career
- Position: Lock
International career
Years	Team	Apps	(Points)
1983	Wales	1	(0)

Terence Windsor Shaw (born 9 August 1962) is a Welsh former rugby union international.

Born in Ystrad Mynach, Shaw was a Newbridge lock who was capped once for Wales, as one of six debutants against Romania in Bucharest in 1983. The 21-year old was normally a front-jumper but was placed in the middle of a line-out which performed poorly, as Wales lost 6–24 to the hosts and he was never picked for Wales again.

Shaw, an engineer by profession, had a stint with New Zealand club Pleasant Point in 1986 and represented the provincial team South Canterbury in a match against the touring Wallabies. He also played some rugby with Cardiff RFC.

== See also ==
- List of Wales national rugby union players
