= Folly Tower, Pontypool =

Coordinates: 51.71678°N 3.02190°W

Folly Tower
- Welsh: Tŵr Ffoledd
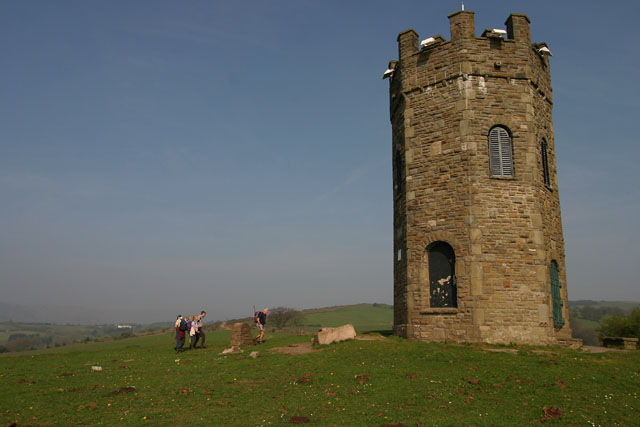
- The Folly Tower, Pontypool
- Interactive map of the Folly Tower area

General information
- Status: Complete – demolished, but rebuilt
- Type: Folly
- Architectural style: Stone tower with crenelated top
- Location: Pontypool Park, Torfaen, South Wales, Pontypool, Wales
- Coordinates: Grid ref: SO 2954902550
- Elevation: 1,000 ft (305 m) above sea level
- Completed: 1765 to 1770
- Renovated: 1831 & 1994
- Demolished: 9 July 1940
- Client: John Hanbury
- Owner: Torfaen County Borough Council

Height
- Height: 40 ft (12 m)

The Folly Tower (Welsh: Tŵr Ffoledd) is a folly located within the grounds of a working farm, close to Pontypool Park, Torfaen, South Wales (Grid ref: SO 2954902550). It is a prominent local landmark above the A4042 Pontypool to Abergavenny road and overlooks Pontypool to the west and rural Monmouthshire to the east.

The Folly is octagonal in shape and roughly 40 ft (12 m) high and is approximately 1,000 ft (305 m) above sea level on the eastern hill range of the Eastern Valley of Monmouthshire, just south of Mynydd Garn-Wen. Less than a mile from the folly is the Shell Grotto.

== Early history ==
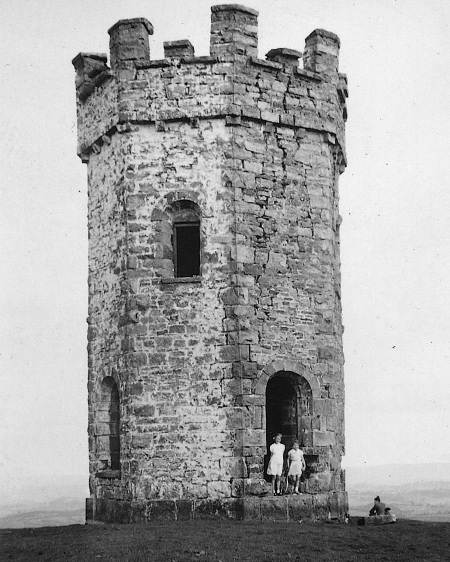
The Folly Tower, Pontypool, circa 1930s, before being demolished during the Second World War

The precise date of construction is unknown but it is generally thought that the original tower was built around 1765 to 1770 by John Hanbury, a local landowner and ironmaster who owned Pontypool Park.

The local name of The Folly was in use as far back as 1865 when the Free Press of Monmouthshire described it as:

"...an elevated spot where a Tower (formerly a Roman watch-tower) was many years since rebuilt as an observatory and which is popularly known as 'The Folly'."

It is thought that the tower was renovated around 1831 by Capel Hanbury Leigh. This date is derived from a keystone from the doorway bearing an '1831' inscription. The tower provides a vantage point over the local area and quickly became a popular and a well known feature of the area.

In May 1935, an estimated 15 to 20,000 people gathered at the Folly Tower to celebrate the Silver Jubilee of King George V with the lighting of a bonfire.

However, the Folly, being open to the elements, began to fall into a state of disrepair during the late 1930s. Pontypool Park Estate Office attached notices to the structure informing visitors of the potential dangers of falling masonry. Its draw on the locals though remained unstinted and local poet and illustrator Myfanwy Haycock penned the following verse in 1937:

Here where the hill holds heaven in her hands,
High above Monmouthshire the grey tower stands,
He is weather-worn and scarred, and very wise,
For rainbows, clouds and stars shine through his eyes.

== Demolition ==
On 9 July 1940 the War Office ordered that, as a security measure under the Emergency Powers (Defence) Act 1939, the Folly was to be demolished. This was in the belief that its presence would be a landmark for the Luftwaffe seeking to raid the nearby Royal Ordnance Factory at ROF Glascoed to the east beyond Little Mill, Monmouthshire.

== Initial rebuilding schemes ==
In 1946, Pontypool Chamber of Trade led the first campaign to rebuild the local landmark, but the project quickly stalled. Another attempt in the 1948 campaigns started to collect public donations to rebuild the Folly Tower; however, an attempt to get local council funding was thwarted during a local council meeting in July of that year. The council's priority at the time being post-war house building programs in the local area.

== Rebuilding ==
At the beginning of 1990, a number of local historians and conservationists decided it was time to restore the Folly Tower to its former glory. A committee was set up to canvas various funding bodies as well as open negotiations with the National Park Authority. The creation of the Campaign for the Reconstruction of the Folly Tower (CROFT) then achieved sufficient backing so that the required £60,000 was raised to rebuild the Folly Tower. Contributions were made by The Prince of Wales' Committee and European Regional Development Fund.

In April 1990, the original foundations of the tower were unearthed and the original dimensions of the tower were obtained. Planning permission for the reconstruction was given by Brecon Beacons National Park authorities in October of the same year.

In May 1991, 175 tons of dressed stone from the recently demolished Cwmffrwdoer Primary School was donated to the campaign by Torfaen Borough Council. Rebuilding work commenced on the tower by a local building company (Davies and Jenkins) during November 1992. Building work ceased during the winter and resumed in the spring of 1993. The tower stood at approximately 20 ft (6 m) by September 1993 before work ceased again for the oncoming winter. Work restarted in the spring of 1994 and by July work on both the interior and exterior was complete.

The tower was officially reopened by the Prince of Wales on 22 July 1994. A plaque on the side of the tower commemorates the opening and reads:

"Folly Tower, Rebuilt 1994. This scheme has been financed by the European Regional Development Fund, Torfaen Borough, Croft Pontypool, Gwent County Council, The Prince of Wales' Committee"

== Visitor information ==
Access to the Folly Tower is via a field which is part of a working farm. Livestock is often present, not only in this field, but on the common land surrounding the council car park. A barrier was erected in 2010 to protect the area to prevent campers and other visitors overstaying.
