= Don Hayward =

GB & Wales international rugby union & league footballer

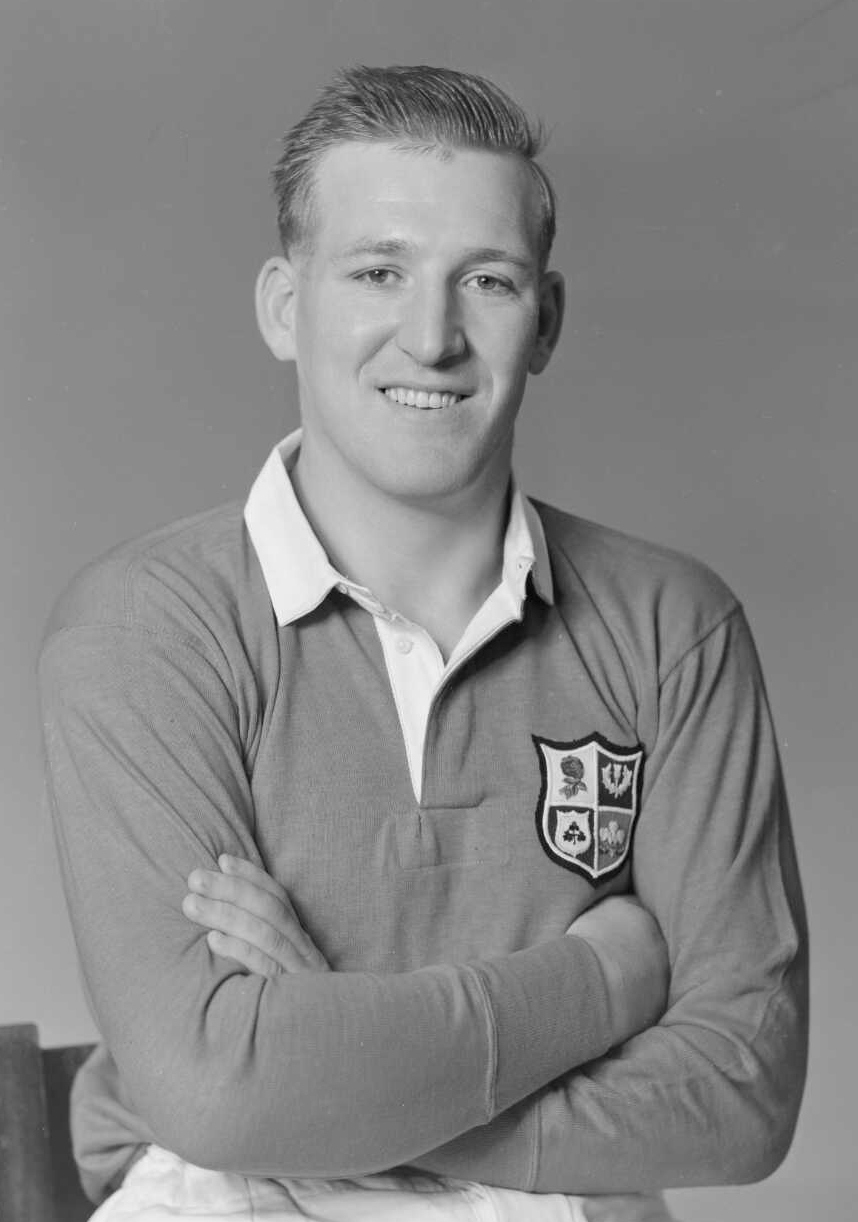
- Hayward in New Zealand in 1950
- Born: Donald James Hayward; 30 June 1925 Pontypool, Wales
- Died: 16 February 1999 (aged 73) Lower Hutt, New Zealand
- Occupation(s): railwayman, fireman

Rugby union career
- Position(s): Lock, Prop
Amateur team(s)
Years	Team	Apps	(Points)
- Newbridge RFC
International career
Years	Team	Apps	(Points)
1949–1952	Wales	15	(0)
1950	British Lions	3	(0)
- Rugby league career

Playing information
- Position: Prop
Club
Years	Team	Pld	T	G	FG	P
1954–55	Wigan	35				9

Donald James Hayward (30 June 1925 – 16 February 1999) was a Welsh international prop who played club rugby for Newbridge and Wigan RLFC. He won 15 caps for Wales, and was selected to play in the British Lions on the 1950 tour of Australia and New Zealand. Hayward is considered to be one of the finest forwards to represent Wales in the early post-war period. He was an excellent lineout specialist and was an aggressive mauler in the loose. Hayward was also an extremely strong tackler and played with total conviction.

== Rugby career ==
Born in 1925 in Pontypool and played for 'second class' team Newbridge, who before 1939 would rarely be selected for Welsh trials, but this changed after World War II. With an improved list of opponents, and an impressive roster of players, Newbridge gained trials for several of its players including Hayward and Ray Cale who were both selected. Hayward was first selected for Wales in 1949 after Rees Stephens pulled out of the game against England. Although Stephens regained his place, Hayward was back in the 1950 season and held his place throughout the Five Nations Championships in 1950 through to 1953.

In 1951, Hayward faced the touring South Africans on two occasions, as part of the Welsh pack, and also as part of a joint Newbridge / Pontypool side. Although Newbridge were beaten by the Springboks, it was an historic game and Hayward proved a formidable opponent.

Hayward would later emigrate to New Zealand, but returned to Britain to play rugby league.

=== International matches played ===
Wales

- England 1949, 1950, 1951, 1952
- France 1949, 1950, 1951, 1952
- Ireland 1950, 1951, 1952
- Scotland 1950, 1951, 1952
- South Africa 1951

== British Lions ==
During the 1950 British Lions tour Hayward was over-selected in the early games, playing in the first three tests against New Zealand, but looked tired in the third test and was far below his normal form. In total he played 18 matches on the tour.

- New Zealand 1950, 1950, 1950
