= Menna Clatworthy =

British immunologist and academic

Menna Clatworthy FRCP FMedSci FLSW
- Education: Cardiff University School of Medicine; Pembroke College, Cambridge (PhD)
- Awards: Medical Research Society Young Investigator Award (2005); British Renal Association Raine Award (2006); Pilkington Prize, University of Cambridge (2017); European Federation of Immunological Societies-Immunology Letters Lecture Award (2019); EMBO Member (2022)
- Scientific career
- Fields: Nephrology; Immunology
- Workplaces: University Cambridge; National Institutes of Health; Wellcome Sanger Institute

Menna Ruth Clatworthy is a Welsh physician and academic in the fields of nephrology and immunology. Clatworthy is Professor of Translational Medicine at the University of Cambridge and the Director of the Cambridge Institute for Immunology and Infectious Disease. She is Fellow and Director of Studies in Clinical Medicine at Pembroke College, University of Cambridge, and holds an Associate Faculty position in the Cellular Genomics programme at the Wellcome Sanger Institute. As a Consultant Nephrologist, she provides care to patients undergoing kidney transplants. She was elected as a Fellow of the Academy of Medical Sciences in 2020, and was elected to the European Molecular Biology Organization in 2022. In October 2026, she was appointed to the Regius Professorship of Medicine at the University of Oxford.

== Early life and education ==
Clatworthy was born and grew up in South Wales and went to St Alban's RC High School, Torfaen in Pontypool. Clatworthy completed an undergraduate degree in medicine at the University of Wales College of Medicine, Cardiff, and moved to the University of Cambridge to undertake general medical and nephrology training, becoming a member of the Royal College of Physicians of London in 2001. She completed a PhD in immunology at Cambridge and Pembroke College, supported by a Wellcome Clinical PhD Fellowship under the supervision of Professor Ken Smith, studying IgG antibody receptors. For this work, she received the UK Kidney Association Raine Award and the Academy of Medical Sciences / Medical Research Society Young Investigator Award. She subsequently undertook postdoctoral studies funded by a Wellcome Intermediate Fellowship, based at Cambridge and the National Institutes of Health in Ron Germain's lab.

== Research and career ==
Clatworthy looks to understand the types of immune cells that live within human organs, and how their local environment impacts their function. She studies human tissue immunity in lymphoid and non-lymphoid organs, using genomic technologies (including single cell genome sequencing) and advanced imaging to uncover how environmental cues shape immune responses in health and disease. Clatworthy established the Cambridge Tissue Immunity Laboratory, and has generated data for the kidney cell atlas and the bladder cell atlas. As part of the international Human Cell Atlas consortium, she is Network Coordinator of the Kidney Biological Network, which aims to create a comprehensive reference atlas of the kidney across the lifespan, sex and ancestry backgrounds, and has also contributed to additional Human Cell Atlas studies with collaborators Sarah Teichmann, Muzlifah Haniffa and Sam Behjati.

Clatworthy has made important contributions to our understanding of kidney immunity. For example, she discovered that high salt in the medulla of the kidney provides a cue for epithelial cells to produce cytokines that attract immune cells, and promotes the antibacterial activities of these cells. Clatworthy's lab produced one of the first kidney single cell atlases, which included the finding that pelvic epithelial cells produced anti-microbial peptides and signals to recruit neutrophils, in order to fight bacteria from the bladder. Her lab discovered that healthy urine contains neutrophils that are poised to undergo NETosis, and that one of the commonly used tests in medicine, the urine dipstick leucocyte esterase test, is an indicator of NETosis. She has also made discoveries in how IgG antibodies mediate infection and autoimmunity, for example in malaria, sepsis and inflammatory bowel disease, and how circulating IgG immune complexes lead to joint pain.

Clatworthy has studied the role of the immune system in the central nervous system, particularly in the meninges, making use of mouse models. In collaboration with Dorian McGavern at the National Institutes of Health, she observed that antibody-producing B cells and plasma cells within the dura (the outer part of the meninges) were aligned along the border of the dural venous sinuses, and that these cells produced Immunoglobulin A, antibodies which are typically found in the gut. These antibody-producing cells originated in the intestine before migrating to the brain, and their antibodies protect the brain when microbes enter the blood stream. A following study discovered clusters of lymphoid tissue within the meninges that support immunity at the border of the central nervous system. Clatworthy has also contributed to studies investigating immune contributions to neurological disorders, including Parkinson's disease and depression.

During the COVID-19 pandemic, Clatworthy investigated the immune responses of people who suffered severe and asymptomatic COVID-19 and defined how patients with obesity respond differently to COVID-19, contributing to increased risk of severe disease.

Clatworthy has also made extensive contributions to medical education, including as an author of medical textbooks.

On 14th October 2026, it was announced that the King had approved Professor Clatworthy as Regius Professor of Medicine at the University of Oxford in succession to Professor Sir John Bell. Clatworthy is the first woman appointed to this Regius Chair, and will take up this role and become a Fellow (or Student) of Christ Church, Oxford from 1 March 2027.

== Recognition ==
In 2006, Clatworthy was awarded the Raine Award from the UK Kidney Association for her contribution to immune inhibition in the kidney. In 2012, Clatworthy was made a Fellow of the Royal College of Physicians (FRCP). In 2017, Clatworthy received the Pilkington Prize for outstanding contribution to medical education at the University of Cambridge. In 2019, she was chosen by the UK Kidney Association to deliver the Chandos Lecture that recognises outstanding contributions to kidney research. In 2019, Claworthy was awarded the European Federation of Immunological Societies - Immunology Letters Lecture Award for her research in clinical immunology. In 2020, Clatworthy was elected a Fellow of the Learned Society of Wales (FLSW) and a Fellow of the Academy of Medical Sciences (FMedSci), and in 2022 was elected to European Molecular Biology Organisation (EMBO).

== Selected publications ==
- Smith KG & Clatworthy M. FcgammaRIIB in autoimmunity and infection: evolutionary and therapeutic implications. Nature Reviews Immunology. 2010.
- Clatworthy M. Transplantation at a Glance. 2012.
- Stewart BJ et al. Spatiotemporal immune zonation of the human kidney. Science. 2019.
- Fitzpatrick Z et al. Gut-educated IgA plasma cells defend the meningeal venous sinuses. Nature. 2020.
- Stewart AP et al. Neutrophil extracellular traps protect the kidney from ascending infection and are required for a positive leukocyte dipstick test. Science Translational Medicine. 2024.
- Fitzpatrick Z et al. Venous-plexus-associated lymphoid hubs support meningeal humoral immunity. Nature. 2024.
