= Torfaen Museum =

Local museum in Pontypool, Wales

- Amgueddfa Torfaen (Welsh)
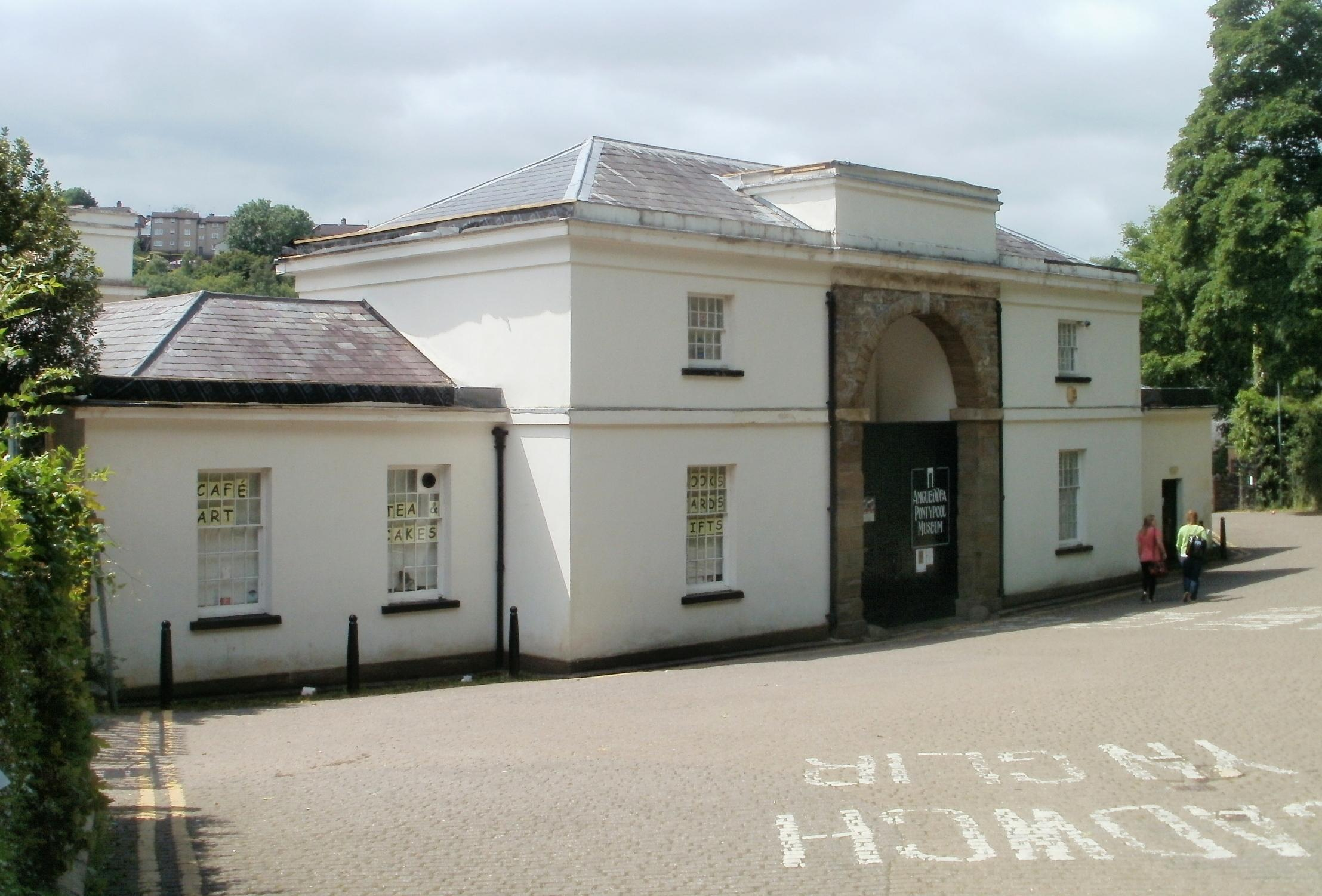

- Location within Torfaen
- Location: Pontypool Park, Pontypool, Torfaen, Wales
- Coordinates: 51.7035°N 3.0398°W
- Visitors: 35,000 per year
- Website: torfaenmuseum.org.uk

Torfaen Museum (Welsh: Amgueddfa Torfaen; formerly the Valley Inheritance Museum and Pontypool Museum) is a local history museum located in Pontypool, Torfaen, South Wales. It is managed by a trust.

The museum is situated within the Georgian stable block that once formed part of residence of the Hanbury family – local ironmasters during the 18th and 19th centuries.

== Background ==
It is an accredited museum, and is located in Pontypool, Torfaen. It is managed by the Torfaen Museum Trust (Welsh: Ymddirieolaeth Amgueddfa Torfaen).

== Collections ==
The museum has permanent and visiting exhibitions throughout the year detailing the industrial, social and cultural heritage and history of the Torfaen valley and Pontypool. Collections include local artefacts (clocks, household objects, ephemera) and a large collection of Pontypool & Usk Japanware, which was produced from the mid-18th century. Local artists show at the museum.

The Dobell-Moseley Library & Archive is available for doing research into the local area.
