= Myfanwy Haycock =

British writer

Myfanwy Haycock (1913–1963) was a Welsh poet, illustrator, BBC broadcaster, and journalist. She was born Blodwen Myfanwy Haycock in Pontnewynydd, Wales, near Pontypool, in the traditional county of Monmouthshire, .

== Early life and education ==
She was the youngest of three daughters born to James David Haycock, a miner and his wife, Alice Maud. She was educated locally at Cwm-ffrwd-oer Primary School and Pontypool Grammar School for Girls, entering Cardiff Technical College.

She worked as a black and white illustrator but had success with her poetry, winning at the Welsh National Eisteddfod in Port Talbot in 1932.

She decided to forsake a career as an art teacher for that of a freelance journalist.

From 1936 she wrote poems and short stories and often illustrated them with woodcuts and black and white illustrations. These were regularly published in the Western Mail newspaper, based in Cardiff, and other South Wales papers. She also submitted work to journals and other publications.

== World War II ==
During World War II she initially became a wages clerk in a munitions factory at ROF Glascoed between Pontypool and Usk, then Assistant Welfare Officer in a Cardiff barrage balloon factory, a teacher and then an Information Officer at the local agricultural college at Usk.

In 1943 she joined the BBC in London where two of her radio plays were broadcast. She gave regular readings over the airwaves and she entered journalism in 1945, also in London, writing articles for various papers.

She also designed cards, had poems published, illustrated books and became a member of the Society of Women Journalists.

== Marriage and family life ==
In the summer of 1947 she married Dr. Arthur Meirion Williams of Borth, a hospital Consultant based in Surrey. They lived at Buckland near Reigate, bringing up three children.

Her health gradually deteriorated although she still wrote articles and even read some of her poems on television.

She died in 1963.

== Legacy ==
She is known for 'Mountain Over Paddington' 1964 and collections of her poetry, 'Poems' 1944 and 'More Poems' 1945.

In 2023 the Myfanwy Haycock Poetry Trail was launched in her hometown, taking in all of the places from which Myfanwy drew poetic inspiration. A giant wooden sculpture of Myfanwy on a carved wooden book, engraved with her poems marks the start of the trail in The Italian Gardens, Pontypool Park. A collaboration between broadcaster and BBC continuity announcer, Jenni Crane, and Pontypool Community Council three Trails are accompanied by an audio poetry app.

The Statue was made by artist Chris Wood and unveiled by Jack Hanbury-Tenison and councillor Gaynor James on 22 July 2023.

Pontypool-born broadcaster Jenni Crane tells the astonishing undiscovered story of Myfanwy Haycock – one of the town's most endearing and talented female poets in BBC Radio Wales Arts documentary "My hill of dreams : Myfanwy Haycock."

Her work and bardic chair can be seen on display at Torfaen Museum.
