= 1964 Fiji rugby union tour of Europe and Canada =

Summary
P	W	D	L
Total
12	5	1	6
Test match
3	1	0	2
Opponent
P	W	D	L
Wales XV
1	0	0	1
France
1	0	0	1
Canada XV
1	1	0	0

The 1964 Fiji rugby union tour of Europe and Canada was a series of matches played by the Fiji national rugby union team in Wales, France, and Canada between September and October 1964. Twelve matches were played, three against national sides.

== Results ==
Scores and results list Fiji's points tally first.

Opposing Team	For	Against	Date	Venue	Status
Bridgend & Maesteg	23	12	12 September 1964	Bridgend	Tour match
Glamorgan & Monmouth	22	23	16 September 1964	Newport	Tour match
Western Counties XV	12	6	19 September 1964	Stradey Park, Llanelli	Tour match
Wales XV	22	28	26 September 1964	Arms Park, Cardiff	Test match
Abertillery & Newbridge	11	11	29 September 1964	Abertillery	Tour match
South East XV	8	28	3 October 1964	Lyon	Tour match
Languedoc-Roussillon	20	5	7 October 1964	Perpignan	Tour match
France B	12	22	10 October 1964	Toulouse	Tour match
South West XV	11	20	14 October 1964	Biarritz	Tour match
France	3	21	17 October 1964	Yves-du-Manoir, Colombes	Test match
British Columbia	23	5	22 October 1964	Vancouver	Tour match
Canada XV	13	3	24 October 1964	Victoria	Test match
