= Blaenavon Railroad =

The Blaenavon Railroad was a horse drawn tramroad built to link Blaenavon Ironworks with the Monmouthshire Canal in south east Wales.

== Background ==
In 1789 most of the building of Blaenavon Ironworks had been completed and the lease for the land was signed in November. At this time transport of goods between Blaenavon and Newport was by teams of packhorses and mules using hillside tracks and parish roads.

A more efficient method of transport was needed and Thomas Hill I, the leading partner behind the ironworks, became one of the promoters of the Monmouthshire Canal. In 1791 a parliamentary bill proposed the canal and was given assent in 1792. The Canal Act also allowed for the building of tramroads to nearby collieries, quarries, and mines.

== Construction ==
The newly formed Monmouthshire Canal Company appointed Thomas Dadford, Jr. as engineer for both the canal and tramroad. Construction started in 1793 and the tramroad/canal link to the port of Newport opened in February 1796.

The tramroad was originally built with a 3 ft 4 in (1,016 mm) gauge. The route to the canal at Pontnewynydd was 5 miles (8.0 km) and descended 600 feet (180 m).

== Closure ==
In 1845 the Monmouthshire Canal Company obtained the Newport and Pontypool Railway Act 1845 (8 & 9 Vict. c. clxix) authorising improvements to the Blaenavon Railroad and the connection of it to a new railway to Newport under the control of a new company, the Newport and Pontypool Railway. The completed 4 ft 8 1/2 in (1,435 mm) gauge line opened in 1854, replacing the tramroad.

== Remains ==
Very little evidence of the tramroad is visible but an iron milepost exists on the road that was once the route of the tramroad.
