= Pontypool =

Town in Torfaen, Wales

Coordinates: 51.703°N 03.041°W

Pontypool: Welsh: Pont-y-pŵl
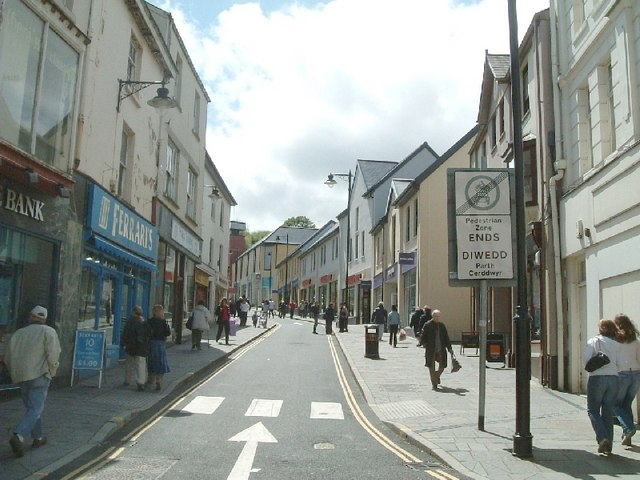
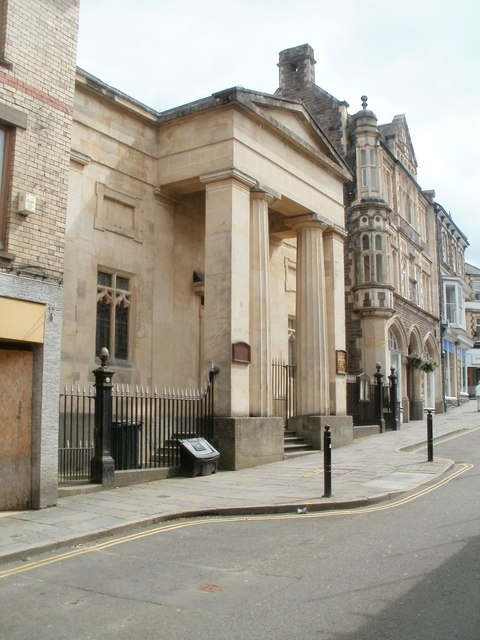
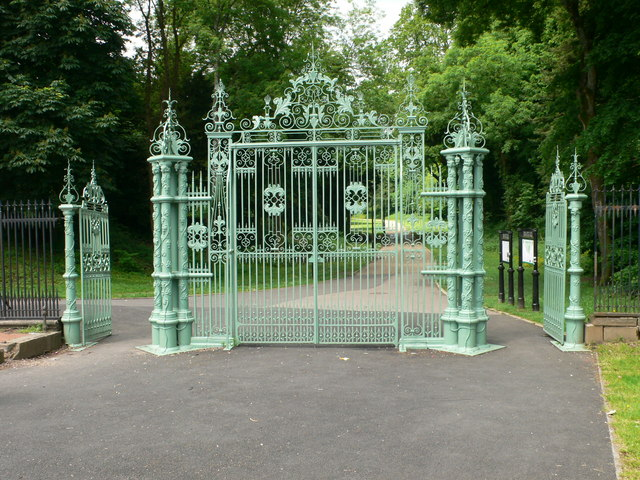
- From the top, Crane Street, Baptist Chapel, Pontypool Park

- Location within Torfaen
- Population: 29,062
- OS grid reference: SO285005
- Principal area: Torfaen
- Preserved county: Gwent
- Country: Wales
- Sovereign state: United Kingdom
- Post town: PONTYPOOL
- Postcode district: NP4
- Dialling code: 01495
- Police: Gwent
- Fire: South Wales
- Ambulance: Welsh
- UK Parliament: Torfaen
- Senedd Cymru – Welsh Parliament: Torfaen

Pontypool (Welsh: Pont-y-pŵl [ˌpɔntəˈpuːl]) is a town and the administrative centre of the county borough of Torfaen, within the historic boundaries of Monmouthshire in South Wales. As of 2021, it has a population of 29,062.

== Location ==
It is situated on the Afon Lwyd river in the county borough of Torfaen. Located at the eastern edge of the South Wales coalfields, Pontypool grew around industries including iron and steel production, coal mining, and the growth of the railways. A rather artistic manufacturing industry which also flourished here alongside heavy industry was Japanning, a type of lacquer ware.

Pontypool covers several areas, hamlets, villages and towns including New Inn, Griffithstown, Sebastopol (Panteg.) Abersychan, Cwmffrwdoer, Pontnewynydd, Trevethin, Penygarn, Wainfelin, Tranch, Brynwern, Pontymoile, Blaendare, Cwmynyscoy, Talywain, Garndiffaith, Pentwyn, and Varteg.

== History ==
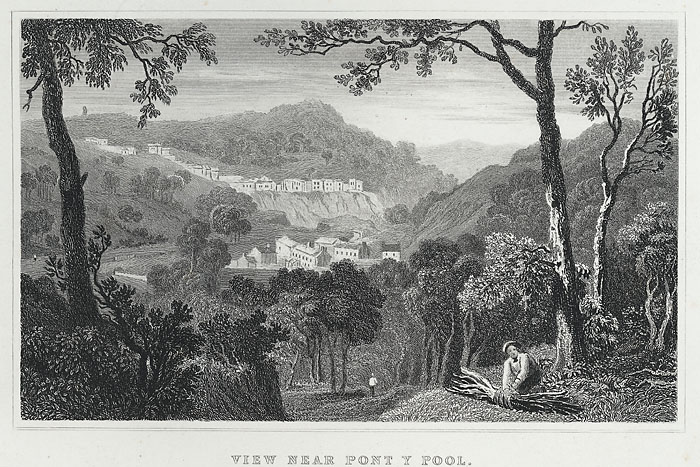
View of Pontypool, 1830

The name of the town in Welsh – Pont-y-pŵl – originates from a bridge ('pont') associated with a pool in the Afon Lwyd. The Welsh word pŵl is a borrowing from English pool and is found in other place-names in Gwent. Pontypool is an anglicised form of the Welsh name.

Pontypool has a notable history as one of the earliest industrial towns in Wales. The town and its immediate surroundings were home to significant industrial and technological innovations, with links to the iron industry dating back to the early fifteenth century when a bloomery furnace was established at Pontymoile. During the sixteenth century, largely due to the influence of the Hanbury family, the area developed its association with the iron industry and continued to consolidate its position in the seventeenth century, when the development of the town began in earnest. Throughout the eighteenth and nineteenth centuries, the metallurgical and extractive industries of the area, along with the development of the canals and railways, provided the impetus to the expansion of Pontypool and its surrounding villages and communities.

=== Industrial development ===
The Afon Lwyd valley, in which Pontypool is situated, provided an abundance of resources for the manufacturing of iron, including coal, iron ore, charcoal and waterpower. The wider technological developments of the Tudor period, such as the utilisation of blast furnaces to produce iron, allowed for the greater exploitation of the mineral resources of south Wales. A blast furnace was in use at Monkswood, near Pontypool, from as early as 1536 and was followed by the erection of other blast furnaces in the area surrounding Pontypool. An ironworks was established in what later became Pontypool Park in c. 1575. Forges, where cast iron could be converted into wrought iron, were also developed and included Town Forge within Pontypool, which was in operation during the last quarter of the sixteenth century, and the Osborne Forge, near Pontnewynydd, which produced the renowned Osmond iron.

Richard Hanbury of Worcestershire, a notable entrepreneur, developed interests within the Pontypool area during the 1570s, acquiring and developing forges and furnaces in Monkswood, Cwmffrwdoer, Trosnant, Llanelly and Abercarn. Hanbury acquired leases and rights to utilise the raw materials of the wider area, including a large expanse of woodland to produce charcoal and some 800 acres of land to extract coal and iron-ore at Panteg, Pontymoile and Mynyddislwyn. Furthermore, he secured the rights to extract coal and iron-ore on Lord Abergavenny's Hills in and around Blaenavon. The Hanburys were also active at Cwmlickey, Lower Race and Blaendare during the seventeenth century as the demand for coal was met.

Major John Hanbury (1664–1734) acquired a reputation as an industrial pioneer and through the endeavours of Hanbury and his leading agents, Thomas Cooke, William Payne and Thomas Allgood, significant developments within the British tinplate industry were made in Pontypool, including the introduction of the world's first rolling for the production of iron sheets and blackplate at the Pontypool Park works in 1697. Tinplate was being produced at Pontypool from c. 1706, with an important tin mill in operation at Pontymoile during the early eighteenth century.

During the 1660s, Thomas Allgood of Northamptonshire was appointed manager of the Pontypool Ironworks. Allgood developed the Pontypool 'japanning' process, whereby metal plate could be treated in a way that generated a lacquered and decorative finish. Thomas Allgood died in 1716, having been unable to commence production of his Pontypool Japanware but the increased creation of tinplate at Pontypool from the early eighteenth century allowed for japanning to enter large-scale manufacture. There was a growing demand for these artistic, luxury products and Allgood's sons, Edward and Thomas, established a japanworks in Pontypool, which was producing large quantities of Japanware by 1732. The brothers produced a range of products, including decorative bread baskets, tea trays, dishes and other items, and were renowned for their high-quality work. Following the death of Edward Allgood in 1761, there was a family quarrel between his two sons and a rival japanning factory was established in Usk. Both the Pontypool and Usk concerns had ceased production by the early 1820s.

From the mid to late eighteenth century, as the Industrial Revolution took hold, there was a massive expansion in the economic development of south Wales. Iron-making flourished in emerging towns and settlements, notably at Merthyr Tydfil, Tredegar and Blaenavon. By the early nineteenth century, south Wales was the most important centre of iron production in the world. Whilst Pontypool was not as competitive as some of the larger ironworks towns, it retained a niche in the metallurgical market, producing specialist tinplate. The japanning industry of Pontypool continued to decline and had ceased by the mid-nineteenth century, by which time the economy of the Pontypool area relied on the iron and coal industries, the tinplate industry and the production of iron rails. The twentieth century witnessed a decline in the heavy industries of south Wales and this had a direct impact on the economy of Pontypool and its district.

=== Urban and civic development ===
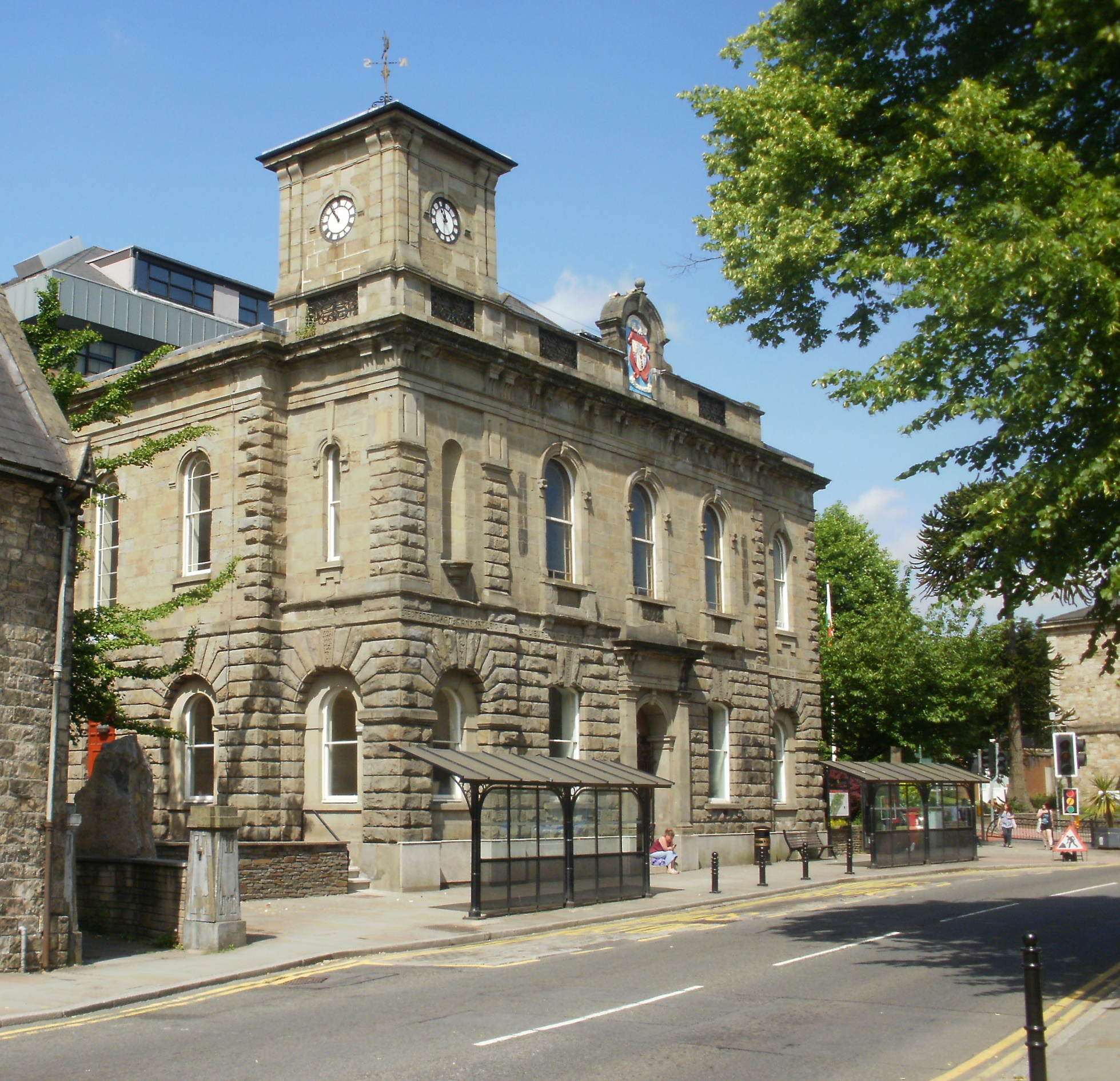
Pontypool Town Hall

The growth of Pontypool accompanied the development of industry. Originally a dispersed, rural settlement, the first centres of growth took place in the hamlets of Trosnant and Pontymoile. However, as the focus of industry and investment became increasingly centred on Pontypool, the town began to emerge as a focal point for the wider, scattered community.

Pontypool was a little village within old Trevethin parish in the ancient hundred of Abergavenny of the County of Monmouth. In 1690, during the reign of William III and Mary II, the Crown accepted a petition for a market to be established in Pontypool, permitting a weekly market and three annual fairs—the village thus officially became a town. A market hall and assembly rooms were erected in 1730–31, thereby elevating the civic position of the community. During the early eighteenth century, the Hanbury family were also developing their Pontypool Park estate as a permanent family residence. The development of industrial works and employment opportunities near the emerging town also precipitated the building of dwellings along the Afon Lwyd to provide housing for the workforce. Trade and commerce also developed and Pontypool, largely due to the endeavours of the Vaughan family, acquired a strong reputation for clock-making during the eighteenth century. By the middle of the eighteenth century, a small town had clearly developed, providing employment, housing and a commercial role, also serving as an important local centre for the surrounding hamlets. By the time Archdeacon William Coxe visited Pontypool at the beginning of the nineteenth century, the town had some 250 houses and a number of thriving shops and businesses, catering for a population of approximately 1,500 people.

Pontypool continued to grow during the nineteenth century, with many new houses and buildings being erected during the late Victorian period. Concurrently, the outlying villages also grew, effectively creating suburbs of Pontypool town centre. Key civic and community buildings were built during the course of the century, including an abundance of chapels and churches, Pontypool Town Hall, which was provided by Capel Hanbury Leigh in 1856, and a great number of shops, banks, public houses, hotels and a public library from 1906.

The town also developed an important educational role. Pontypool became home to a Welsh Baptist College in 1836, when it moved from Abergavenny. The college trained many Welsh Baptist ministers, large numbers of whom went on to lead congregations in Wales and overseas. It relocated to the new University College of South Wales and Monmouthshire, in Cardiff, in 1893. The former Pontypool College became the County Grammar School for Girls in 1897 and, in the following January, West Monmouth Grammar School was opened for boys. The school's origins date back to the early seventeenth century when William Jones, a wealthy merchant, left a considerable fortune to the Company of Haberdashers to provide charitable and educational services in Monmouth. Monmouth School was built in 1615 and many years later, the trustees of the charity decided to invest in additional schools within the county. 'West Mon' School was consequently built, at a cost of £30,000, on a site donated by John Capel Hanbury in 1896.

Urban growth continued in the twentieth century as national social reforms encouraged the provision of public housing schemes to improve the quality of housing in working-class communities. Redevelopment programmes in the latter half of the century resulted in the demolition of old streets and historic buildings, as well as the creation of new road networks to relieve the increased pressure of vehicular traffic.

=== Transport ===
The industries of the area necessitated good transport links. A network of tramroads was established throughout the Pontypool area to connect sites of extraction to the centres of the production and subsequently to export, and market routes. The construction of the Monmouthshire Canal during the 1790s connected Pontnewynydd to Newport and later connected with the Brecknock and Abergavenny Canal at Pontymoile in 1812. Tramroads leading from industrial areas within an eight-mile radius of the canal converged at either Pontnewynydd or Pontymoile.

The tramroads and canals were superseded by the railways in the mid-nineteenth century. From 1845, work commenced on establishing a railway from Pontypool to Newport. The line opened to passengers in 1852 and connected with Blaenavon in 1854. It eventually came under the management of the Great Western Railway. Another line was constructed during the 1860s and 1870s to connect Pontypool with Newport via Caerleon. Connections were also made with Abergavenny, Hereford and the Taff Vale. Pontypool had three railway stations, namely Crane Street, Clarence Street and Pontypool Road. Line closures during the 1960s greatly reduced the valley's railway connections, which were replaced by modern roads. The only passenger line still operating within Pontypool is at an unstaffed station in New Inn. Pontypool & New Inn station is on the Welsh Marches Line with trains provided by Transport for Wales.

=== Pontypool Park ===
Pontypool Park was the historic seat of the Hanbury family, who developed a permanent residence in Pontypool in c. 1694 and, under the direction of Major John Hanbury, subsequently established a deer park in the early 1700s. The park became a venue for recreation and enjoyment for the Hanbury family and their associates. An example of the luxury and display demonstrated by the family is the ornate shell grotto summerhouse within the park, completed and decorated during the 1830s.

Pontypool Park House was gradually extended and modified, with major changes in the mid-18th century, the early 1800s and 1872. Alterations were also made within Pontypool Park during the 19th century and included the dismantling of the old ironworks in 1831, the reconstruction of the park gates by Thomas Deakin of Blaenavon in 1835, the planting of trees to increase the privacy of the family from the gaze of outsiders, and the development of the American Gardens in 1851.

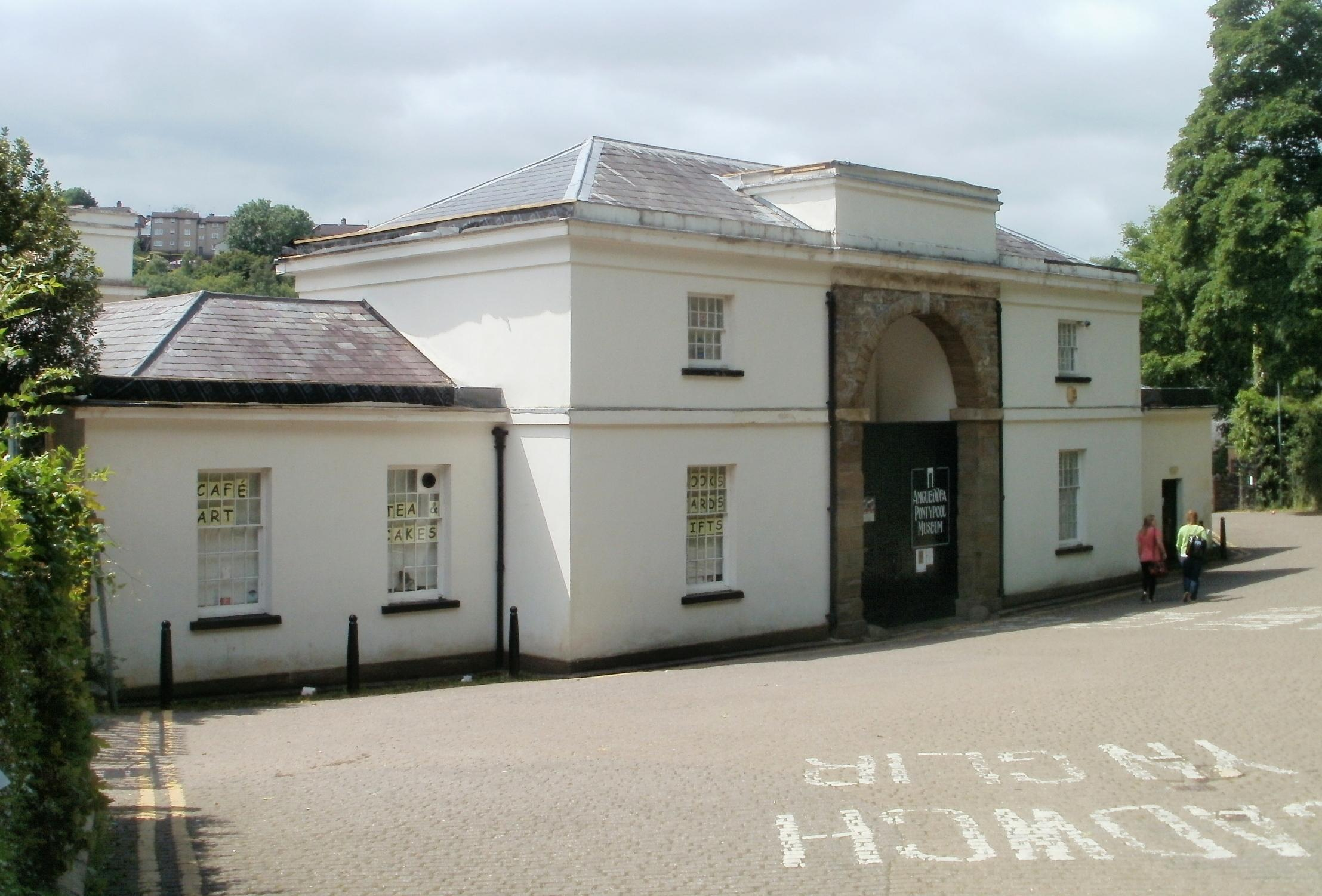
Amgueddfa Torfaen Museum

In 1920, the house and its park entered public ownership, and this allowed for the site to be developed as a public amenity. Developments during the 1920s witnessed the introduction of public tennis courts, a rugby ground and a bowling green. A notable event was the Royal National Eisteddfod, which took place in the park in 1924. A bandstand was added in 1931, allowing the townspeople the opportunity to listen to music in the open air. A leisure centre and artificial ski slope were introduced in 1974.

Pontypool Park House was sold to the Sisters of the Order of the Holy Ghost in 1923, who utilised the building as a girls' boarding school. It eventually became St. Alban's R.C. High School. The adjacent stable block was used for a variety of purposes during the 20th century but ultimately became home to the Valley Inheritance Museum in 1981, which was set up by Torfaen Museum Trust (est. 1978) to accommodate, safeguard and present the collections relating to the heritage of the Afon Lwyd valley.

== Education ==
The town has four comprehensive schools: Abersychan School; West Monmouth School (formerly Jones' West Monmouth Grammar School for Boys); St. Alban's R.C. High School; and Ysgol Gymraeg Gwynllyw, a Welsh-medium education school teaching students between 3 and 19 years old.

Trevethin Community School was closed at the end of the 2007 academic year. This was formerly the Pontypool Grammar School for Girls (also known as 'The County'), although at one time the sole campus was where the Welsh-medium school Ysgol Gymraeg Gwynllyw now stands. Trevethin Community School was also the original site of the Welsh Baptist College.

Having been kept open as a vaccination centre during the COVID outbreak of 2020, Pontypool Campus Coleg Gwent (formerly known as Pontypool College) permanently closed in 2023. The local borough council is now considering the former campus as a potential housing site.

Crownbridge Special School was based in Pontypool; however, in 2012, the school moved to new facilities in Cwmbran.

== Sport and leisure ==
Pontypool Active Living Centre, in Pontypool Park, is a leisure centre with the only swimming venue in Pontypool. It has a 25-metre swimming pool for competitive swimming galas and viewing for up to 200 spectators. It also has a separate teaching pool and two hydroslides. Pontypool Active Living Centre has a fitness suite, as well as a dance studio and sports hall.

Pontypool Park is also home to Wales's oldest and longest artificial ski slope. Built in 1974 and at 230m long, it is used for leisure and by the Welsh Ski Squad for training. The ski slope is closed for part of the year due to local council funding cutbacks.

In the grounds of Pontypool Park there is a play park for children and a skate park, as well as a picnic area and outdoor tennis courts.

With Pontypridd, Pontefract and Pont y Bala, Pontypool forms a group of parkruns known as “The Full Ponty”, a pun on The Full Monty.

Pontypool RFC’s rugby ground is situated in Pontypool Park grounds.

Pontypool has aBrass Band.

=== Rugby ===
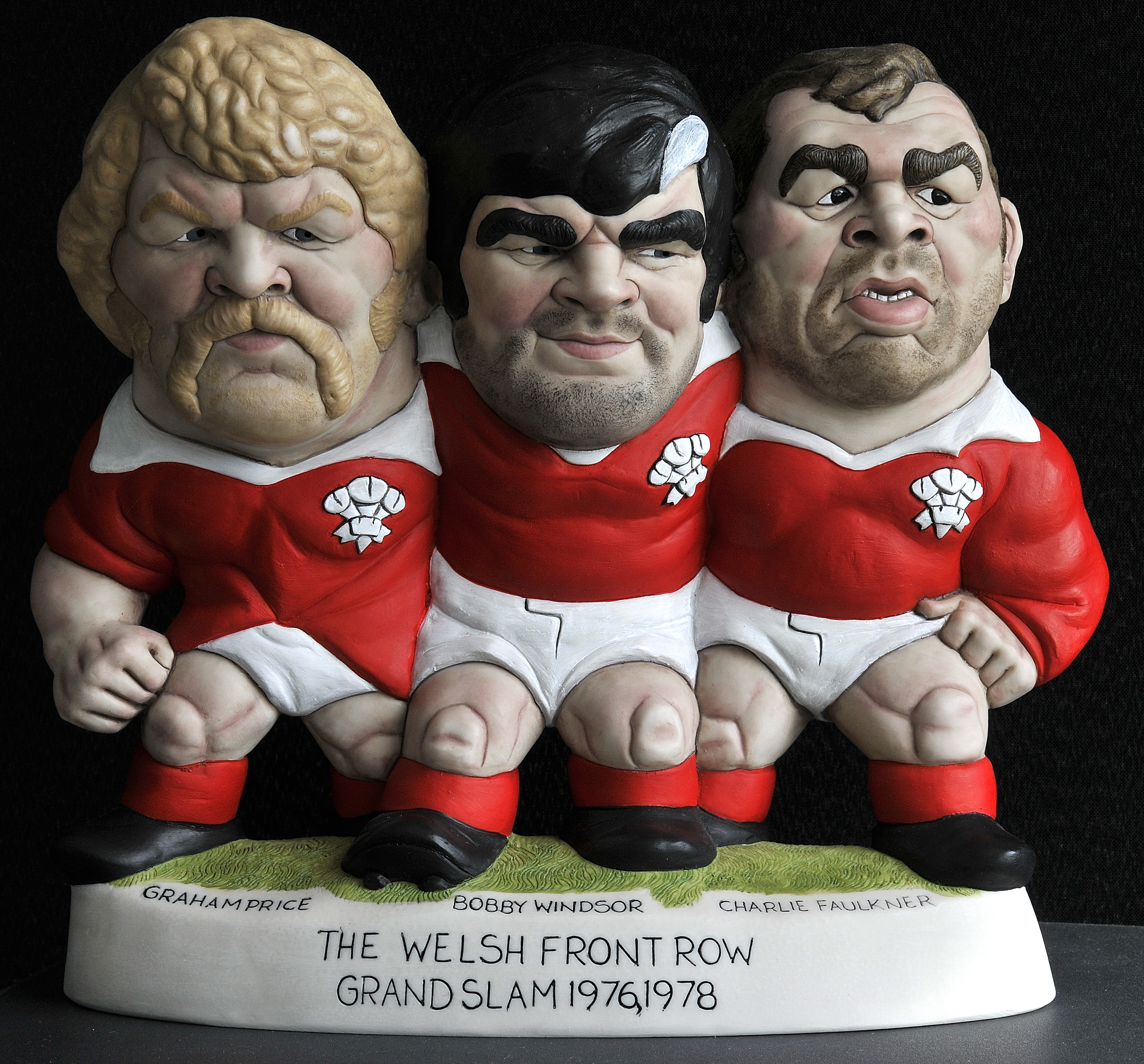
a Grogg of the Pontypool frontrow, (left to right: Graham Price, Bobby Windsor and Charlie Faulkner)

Pontypool Rugby Football Club is one of the town's cornerstones. Founded in the 1970s, the club became a founder member of the Welsh Rugby Union in 1981. Under the captaincy of Terry Cobner, the intervening years saw 'Pooler' become one of the great teams of Welsh rugby. The legendary 'Pontypool Front Row' in the 1970s, of Bobby Windsor, Charlie Faulkner and Graham Price, was immortalised in song by Max Boyce. The club's contribution to Wales was seen again in 1983, when Pontypool's 'forward factory' produced five of the Welsh pack in the Five Nations Championship. Other rugby union clubs based in or near the town are Pontypool United RFC, Abersychan RFC, Garndiffaith RFC, New Panteg RFC, Talywain RFC and West Mon RFC. Pontypool's rugby league club are called the Torfaen Tigers and play in the Rugby League Conference Welsh Premier.

The Pontypool Wizards are a walking rugby team based at Pontypool United RFC’s Memorial ground on Conway Road. They encourage local people to take part and train every Thursday (7pm-8pm). Pontypool Wizards also help in the community, taking part in charity and litter-picking events.

=== Football ===
Football teams in the area are:

- Fairfield United F.C., Garndiffaith
- Griffithstown AFC, Griffithstown
- Panteg AFC, Panteg
- PILCS AFC, New Inn
- Pontnewynydd AFC
- Pontypool Town AFC
- Race AFC, Blaendare
- Tranch AFC, Tranch

== Notable sights ==
- Big Pit National Coal Museum
- Blaenavon Ironworks
- Blaenavon Heritage Railway -Pontypool and Blaenavon Railway
- Llandegfedd Reservoir
- Monmouthshire and Brecon Canal
- Pontypool Park
- Folly Tower, Pontypool
- Shell Grotto, Pontypool
- Pontymoile Basin
- Torfaen Museum

== Notable people ==
See also Category:People from Pontypool

=== Arts and literature ===
- Aimee-Ffion Edwards – actress
- Annabel Giles – model and presenter
- Anthony Hopkins – actor
- David Llewellyn – novelist
- Dame Gwyneth Jones – opera singer
- Jane Arden – experimental film-maker, writer and poet
- James Dean Bradfield – singer and guitarist, Manic Street Preachers
- Jennifer Daniel – actress
- Keri Collins – screenwriter
- Kevin Owen – TV news anchor
- Lee Dainton – member of Dirty Sanchez
- Luke Evans – actor and singer
- Peredur ap Gwynedd – guitarist, Pendulum
- Myfanwy Haycock – poet
- Steve Parry – musician of the band Hwyl Nofio
- Thomas Barker – painter

=== Business and education ===
- Edwin Stevens – inventor of the first hearing aid
- David Gwilym James – Vice-Chancellor from 1952-65 of the University of Southampton
- Rhys Probert – Director from 1973-80 of the Royal Aircraft Establishment

=== Clergy ===
- Edmund Jones Welsh Dissenting Minister, itinerant preacher, spiritualist, historian and writer who built the Pontypool Meeting house
- Elzear Torreggiani – Capuchin friar and superior 1860–76, later 2nd bishop of Armidale NSW.
- Frank and Seth Joshua – Welsh Revival Evangelists
- Noel Debroy Jones – Bishop of Sodor and Man
- Sarah Clark, Bishop of Jarrow
- Morgan Edwards – historian of religion

=== Public service ===
- Alun Gwynne Jones, Baron Chalfont, politician
- Don Touhig – politician
- Joan Ruddock – politician
- Ivor Bulmer-Thomas – politician
- Paul Murphy – politician
- Roy Jenkins – politician
- Matthew Jones – politician
- Nick Thomas-Symonds – politician, barrister and academic
- Steffan Lewis – politician
- Theodore Huckle – Counsel General for Wales
- William Jones – (1809–1873), chartist

=== Sport ===
- Allen Forward – rugby player
- Aneurin Owen – rugby player
- Bryn Meredith – rugby player
- Caleb McDuff – racing driver
- Cerys Hale – rugby player
- Ellie Curson – professional footballer
- Gareth Maule – rugby player
- Graham Price – rugby player
- Iestyn Thomas – rugby player
- Lenny Woodard - rugby player
- James Waite – football player
- Ken Jones – rugby player
- Lloyd Burns – rugby player
- Luca Hoole – football player
- Mako Vunipola – rugby player
- Marcus Ebdon – footballer
- Mark Taylor – rugby union player
- Ryan Doble – footballer
- Taine Basham – rugby player
- Taulupe Faletau – rugby player
- Terry Cobner – rugby player
- Tony Villars – footballer

== Twinned towns ==
Pontypool is twinned with the following towns:

- Condeixa, Portugal since 1994
- Bretten, Germany since 1994
- Longjumeau, France since 1994

All four towns are twinned with each other and a twinning conference and youth festival is held each year in one of the towns.
