= Kevin Owen =

British news anchor

- Born: 1966 (age 59–60); Plymouth, Devon, England
- Education: Master's in Journalism from Cardiff University
- Occupation: Journalist

Kevin Owen (born 1966) is a British television and radio news anchor, reporter and presenter who was born in Plymouth, UK. He has worked in UK regional and network broadcasting for more than three decades. From 2006 to 2022, he worked at the Russian state-controlled television network RT (formerly Russia Today) as the English network's senior news anchor.

Following a post-graduate diploma in broadcast journalism from Cardiff University, early in his career, Owen presented the BBC Wales news programme Wales Today in the 1980s. He then moved to the commercial station HTV Wales to be one of the main anchors for the station's daily news programme Wales Tonight in the mid-1990s, before moving to sister channel HTV West in Bristol, in 1996. Owen also worked at Channel Television based in Jersey and presented his own radio show on Orchard FM in Somerset. Between 2001 and early 2006, he anchored Sky News and worked extensively for the BBC World Service. Owen moved to Moscow in 2006 to work at RT (formerly Russia Today) as the English network's senior news anchor. He resigned at the end of February 2022 following the Russian invasion of Ukraine.

In 2008, Owen won Russia's TEFI award for "News Anchor of the Year", becoming the first foreigner to win the award. The prize was established in 1995 by the Academy of Russian Television (ART), an association including professionals from leading domestic television companies.
