= Newbridge RFC =

Welsh rugby union club

(Wales) Newbridge RFC
- Full name: Newbridge Rugby Football Club
- Union: Welsh Rugby Union
- Founded: 1888; 137 years ago
- Location: Newbridge, Caerphilly; Wales
- Ground(s): The Welfare Ground
- President: Mr. Robert Collins
- Director of Rugby: Dafydd Lloyd
- Coach(es): Llŷr Davies, Paul "Dire" Edwards, Dawid Rubasniak
- Captain(s): Gavin McDonnell
- League(s): The Welsh Rugby Union Admiral Community Premiership
1st kit	2nd kit

Official website
- newbridge.rfc.wales

Newbridge RFC is a Welsh rugby union club based in Newbridge, Caerphilly, in South Wales. Newbridge RFC was formed in 1888 and joined the WRU in 1911. They currently play in the WRU Admiral Community Premiership

== History ==
Newbridge RFC was established in 1888, but only gained admission to the WRU in 1911, when they secured a ground and facilities up to WRU requirements.

In 1925, Newbridge RFC moved to their present home at the Welfare Ground where they signed a 99-year lease at a shilling a year. A new pavilion had been constructed around this time and the club now share their ground with the local cricket team. The club are presently in their third clubhouse at the site after an explosion and two fires caused damage to past buildings.

On the field, Newbridge have been pioneers of a number of well known rugby traits, most of which were brought to fruition by the pioneering coach Dai Harries during his tenure as club coach in the 1960s. Most recognisably, these are; the tap signal from the hooker to the scrum-half to feed the scrum, the formation of a wall for the taking of penalties and they were also one of the first clubs to introduce the hooker as the player to throw the ball into the lineout. It was during Harries' reign as coach that the club captured the Western Mail Championship to be crowned champions of Wales in the 1964–65 season.

== British and Irish Lions ==
The following players have played for the British and Irish Lions while playing for Newbridge RFC.

- (United Kingdom) Don Hayward

== International honours ==
The following players have been capped at international level while playing for Newbridge RFC.

See also Category:Newbridge RFC players

- (Wales) Billy Gore
- (Wales) Don Hayward
- (Wales) Ray Cale
- (Wales) Ken Braddock
- (Wales) Dennis Hughes
- (Wales) Clive Davis
- (Wales) Terry Shaw
- (Wales) Paul Turner
- (Wales) Andy Allen
- (Wales) Kenny Waters
- (Wales) Andrew Gibbs

== Club honours ==
- Western Mail Championship 1964–65 – Champions
- Snelling Sevens 1990 – Champions
- Snelling Sevens 1992 – Champions
- Ben Francis Cup 2010, 2011, 2022 and 2023 Winners
- WRU League 1 East 2022-2023 - Champions
- WRU National Division 1 Cup 2022-2023 - Champions

== Games played against international opposition ==
Year	Date	Opponent	Result	Score	Tour
1951^{1}	18 October	South Africa	Lost	6–15	1951–52 South Africa rugby union tour of Europe
1962^{2}	24 October	Canada	Won	16-8	1962 tour of the United Kingdom
1964^{3}	24 September	Fiji	Draw	11–11	1964 Fiji rugby union tour of Europe and Canada
1966^{4}	29 November	Australia	Won	12–3	1966–67 Australia rugby union tour of Britain, Ireland and France
1983	18 October	Japan	Lost	14–19	1983 Japan rugby union tour of Wales
1988	15 October	Samoa	Lost	15–16	1988 Western Samoa rugby union tour of Britain and Ireland
1989	23 September	Wales	Lost	4-25	Special Centenary celebration
1990	8 September	Romania	Won	35-21	1990 tour of Wales
1994	9 Mar	Canada A	Lost	8-9	

^{1} A joint Pontypool/Newbridge team.
^{2} A joint Ebbw Vale /Newbridge team.
^{3} A joint Abertillery/Newbridge team.
^{4} A joint Pontypool/Cross Keys/Newbridge team.
