= Shell Grotto, Pontypool =

Shell Grotto
- Welsh: Groto Cregyn
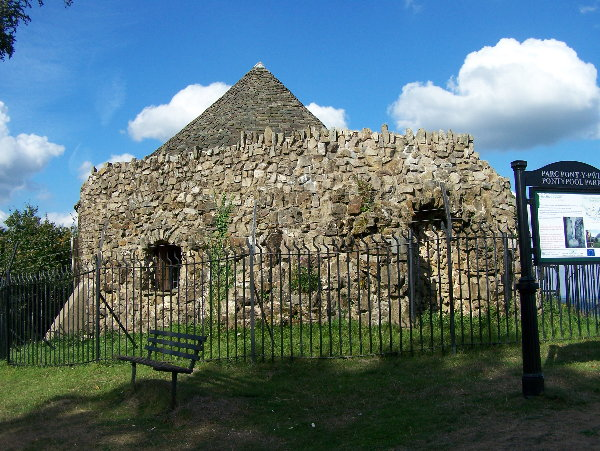
- The Shell Grotto in Pontypool Park
- Interactive map of the Shell Grotto area
- Alternative names: Shell Hermitage

General information
- Status: Completed
- Type: Grotto
- Architectural style: Stone with slate roof
- Location: Pontypool Park, Torfaen, South Wales, Pontypool, Wales
- Coordinates: 51.7031°N 3.0227°W
- Elevation: 700 ft (213 m) above sea level
- Completed: 1784
- Renovated: 1993 to 1994
- Client: John Hanbury
- Owner: Torfaen County Borough Council

Height
- Height: 29 ft (9 m)

The Shell Grotto - (Welsh: Groto Cregyn) - (sometimes called the Shell Hermitage) is a Grade II* listed (as of 7 February 1962) late-18th-century stone built, cylindrical, slate roofed shell grotto decorated with shells and animal bones on the interior. It stands on a prominent ridge 700 ft (213 m) above sea level, within the boundary of Pontypool Park, Torfaen in south Wales. It is considered to be the best surviving grotto in Wales. It is an important local landmark commanding views south towards the Severn Estuary. A little further along the same ridge can be found the Folly Tower.

== History ==
The grotto was commissioned by John Hanbury as a hunting lodge/summerhouse in the late 18th century. The Hanbury family were local ironmasters who owned Pontypool Park. During the early 19th century, Capel Hanbury Leigh (6 Oct 1776 - 28 Sep 1861) undertook renovations of the family house and park's grounds and it is thought that his wife Molly Ann (married 14 Apr 1797, she was the widow of Sir Robert Humphrey Mackworth (died 1794)) was responsible for the interior shell decoration.

Although there is no direct evidence that the shell interior was Molly's invention, it is known that she was an avid collector of shells (and built another shell grotto near her home at Gnoll). The shell decoration within grottoes was common during the 19th century and it follows that Molly may have followed the trend and begun the work to place the shells in the grotto.

The Hanbury family used the grotto for picnics during nearby shoots throughout the 19th century. During 1882 the then Prince of Wales (later Edward VII), is said to have picnicked at the grotto during a shoot.

== Construction ==
The grotto is constructed of local red Pennant sandstone and conical stone tiled with a fan vaulted roof (with six fans rising from six pillars) and the supporting pillars and ceiling are covered with thousands of shells interspersed with minerals and real stalactites removed from caves in the local area. The interior walls are mostly bare stone, with some embedded calcite crystals. The floor incorporates animal bones and teeth forming arcs, circles, stars, hearts and diamonds. The two remaining windows contain coloured glass.

== Restoration ==
During the 20th century the grotto began to fall into disrepair and by the early 1990s the building was beginning to suffer from the elements as well as vandals. The roof of the grotto had collapsed, and some of the outer walls were beginning to crumble. Public access to the grotto was stopped during the 1970s.

Without renovation the grotto could have been lost totally. Initial reviews of the cost of renovating the property were very high and the local council sought external financial assistance.

Although some minor restoration to the roof was undertaken in January 1992, the grotto continued to suffer and the external walls were quickly becoming a major issue. It was during 1992 and 1993 that the intervention of the Welsh Heritage Authority, Cadw, and the European Regional Development Fund, that enough donations were secured to cover complete restoration of the building.

The exterior of the building was restored over eight months during 1993 and 1994 which included repairs to damaged stone work, renovation of the chimney, roof timber replacement, a new roof, a replacement door and new windows and shutters.

The summer of 1994 saw completion of the exterior work, at a cost of £75,000. Although the exterior was now complete the magnificent shell interior was in complete disarray, due to the elements, the collapsed roof and vandals.

In 1995 a campaign was begun to raise funds to match the local council's resources to restore to former glories the interior of the grotto. Donations were secured once again from Cadw and from the Heritage Lottery Fund in Wales.

Restoration of the shell interior commenced in 1996 and a specialist team of conservators - St Blaise Ltd. - did the restoration of the intricate plaster and shell work. Repairs to the ceiling, pillars, walls and floors took four months to complete.

A photographic record had been taken of the shell interior some years earlier and this was invaluable in ensuring that the repairs were true to character. Many of the shells and minerals that had been dislodged had been stored away and these, together with replacement material, were used in the restoration process. British shells provide the majority of the shells used and include mussels, cockles, periwinkles and limpets, accompanied by a few examples of exotic species such as pearl oyster, conch and cowrie.

The restoration of one of the finest shell grottoes in Wales was completed in December 1996, enabling residents and visitors to Pontypool to once again visit the grotto and enjoy the shell interior and panoramic views.

The root work around walls and ceiling was riddled with worm. To stabilise these almost hollow structures a resin and solvent mixture was painstakingly injected into the holes with a hypodermic needle. When the solvent evaporated the resin hardened making the whole root solid.

The rustic chairs were restored by piecing in new segments which were missing, repairing broken sections, and scraping back layers of modern paint. The chairs had originally been painted, the dull green colour being analysed under the microscope and dated to the middle 19th Century. With the new pieces of wood needing to be painted, it was decided to repaint all chairs in a specially mixed colour to match the original.

== Access and opening times ==
Visiting the grotto involves a steep climb over uneven ground so access can be difficult.
