= Abersychan School =

- Ysgol Abersychan
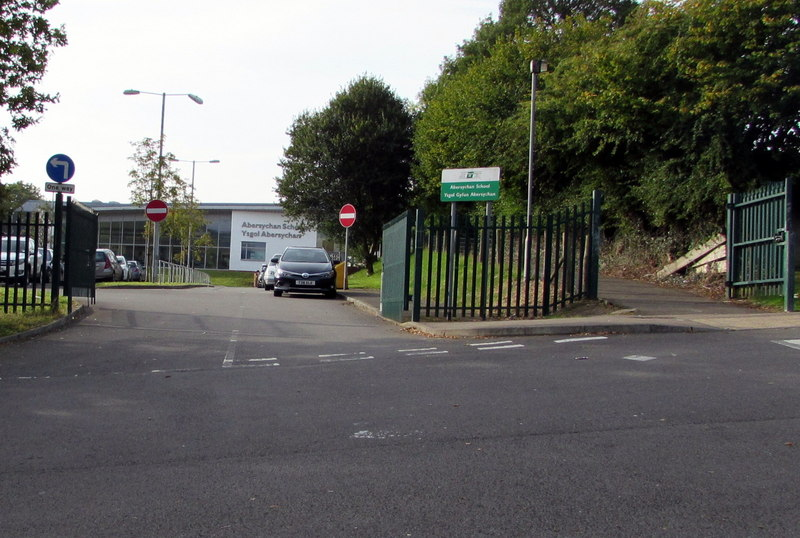

Location
- Incline Road; Abersychan Pontypool, Torfaen, NP4 7DF

Information
- Motto: Dysgu i Fyw (Learning To Live)
- Local authority: Torfaen
- Department for Education URN: 401855 Tables
- Ofsted: Reports
- Chair: Alyson Russen
- Headteacher: Rhodri Thomas
- Staff: Approx. 120
- Gender: Mixed
- Age: 11 to 16
- Enrolment: 759 (2024)
- Language: English-medium
- Houses: Dewi, Glyndwr, Branwen and Gelert
- Colours: Green, Black, White, Silver, and Red (prefects, deputies and headboy/girl)
- Website: www.abersychan.org.uk

Abersychan School is an English-medium 11-16 co-educational comprehensive school in the Pontypool suburb of Abersychan, Wales.

== Admissions ==
As of 2024, Abersychan School had 759 pupils on roll. It serves the north of Torfaen including the communities of Blaenavon, Garndiffaith, Talywain, Abersychan, Pontnewynedd, Cwmffrwdoer, Trevethin, Penygarn and St Cadocs. The local diversity is exemplified by the fact that some areas qualify for Communities First status, while the northern half of the Afon Llwyd encompasses a World Heritage Site.

The school supports a Special Needs Resources Base for pupils in Torfaen with MLD.

== History ==
=== Comprehensive ===
The closure of Trevethin Community School in September 2007 has resulted in large numbers of pupils from its former catchment choosing Abersychan as their preferred school.

The re-organisation of education in the north of the borough was supported by a capital investment in Abersychan School which has improved the teaching and learning facilities, most notably in the form of several classrooms, a sports laboratory, an ICT suite with a 60 PC capacity, an Art and Technology design area, a floodlit astro-turf and a sports field. In 2009 a multi-media learning plaza was opened. In January 2008, the school received a Welsh Secondary Schools Association award for its outstanding contribution to the transition of pupils from the Trevethin Community School to Abersychan School during the period 2006–2007.

== Sports ==
Teams from the school have won regional, national and UK competitions in Magistrates' Courts, Stock Market Challenge, Girls' Rugby, Design and Construction, and Dance.

== Notable alumni ==
=== Abersychan Comprehensive School ===
- Ryan Doble - footballer
- David Llewellyn - novelist
- Mark Taylor - rugby union player

=== Abersychan Grammar School ===
- Prof Geoffrey Arthur, professor of veterinary surgery from 1974 to 1979 at the University of Bristol, and professor of veterinary obstetrics and diseases of reproduction from 1965 to 1973 at the Royal Veterinary College
- Sarah Clark, Bishop of Jarrow in the Church of England
- Allen Forward - international rugby player
- Roy Jenkins, Baron Jenkins of Hillhead - founder of Social Democrat Party, and Labour MP from 1950 to 1977 for Birmingham Stechford, and SDP MP from 1982 to 1987 for Glasgow Hillhead
- Rear-Admiral Brinley Morgan CB, director from 1970 to 1975 of the Naval Education Service
- Robert Ryder, pathologist who found the link between emphysema and coal dust
