= Penygarn, Torfaen =

Coordinates: 51.7071°N 3.0345°W

Pen-y-garn
- Interactive map of Pen-y-garn

Penygarn (officially Pen-y-garn) is a village near Trevethin in Wales.

Penygarn has its own nursery, infant school and junior school. Penygarn has its new housing accommodation, Penygarn heights, built upon the grounds of the old Trevethin community school which has since been demolished.
