= List of Royal Ordnance Factories =

This is a list of Royal Ordnance Factories.

Name	Location	Type	Number
Royal Arsenal Factory No. 1	Woolwich, London, England		No. 1
Royal Small Arms Factory Enfield Factory No. 2	Enfield, London, England		No. 2
Royal Powder Mill	Waltham Abbey, Essex, England	Explosive ROF	No. 31
ROF Aycliffe	County Durham, England	Filling Factory	Filling Factory No. 8
ROF Beech Hill	Wigan, Greater Manchester, England		No. 15
ROF Birtley	Birtley, County Durham, England		No. 3
ROF Bishopton (3 factories)	Bishopton, Renfrewshire, Scotland	Explosive ROF	
ROF Blackburn	Blackburn, Lancashire, England		
ROF Blackpole	Worcester, Worcestershire, England	SAA Factory	No. 20
ROF Brackla	Bridgend, Wales	Filling Factory	Filling Factory No. 11
ROF Bridgend	Bridgend, Wales	Filling Factory	Filling Factory No. 2
ROF Bridgwater	Bridgwater, Somerset, England	Explosive ROF	No. 37
ROF Burghfield (later part of the Atomic Weapons Establishment (AWE)	Burghfield, Berkshire, England	Filling Factory	Filling Factory No. 18
ROF Cardiff (later part of the Atomic Weapons Establishment (AWE)	Llanishen, Cardiff, Wales	Engineering ROF	
ROF Chorley	Euxton, Lancashire, England	Filling Factory	Filling Factory No. 1
ROF Dalmuir	Clydebank, West Dunbartonshire, Scotland	Engineering ROF	
ROF Drigg	Drigg, Cumbria, England	Explosive ROF	
ROF Dunham on the Hill	Dunham on the Hill, Cheshire, England	Explosives storage depot	
ROF Elstow	Bedford, Bedfordshire, England	Filling Factory	Filling Factory No. 16
ROF Fazakerley	Liverpool, Merseyside, England	Rifles Factory	
ROF Featherstone	Featherstone, Wolverhampton, England	Filling Factory	Filling Factory No. 17
ROF Glascoed (later BAE Systems Munitions Glascoed)	Glascoed, Monmouthshire, Wales	Filling Factory	Filling Factory No. 3
ROF Hirwaun	Hirwaun, Rhondda Cynon Taf, Wales		
ROF Irvine	Irvine, North Ayrshire, Scotland	Explosive ROF	
ROF Kirkby	Kirkby, Merseyside, England	Filling Factory	Filling Factory No. 7
ROF Leeds	Leeds, West Yorkshire, England	Engineering ROF	
ROF Maltby	Maltby, South Yorkshire, England	Rifles Factory	
ROF Melmerby	Melmerby, North Yorkshire, England	Munitions Inspection Factory	
ROF Newport	Newport, Wales	Engineering ROF	
ROF Nottingham	Nottingham, Nottinghamshire, England	Engineering ROF	
ROF Patricroft	Eccles, Greater Manchester, England	M/C Shop Engineering ROF	
ROF Pembrey	Pembrey, Carmarthenshire, Wales	Explosive ROF	
ROF Poole	Poole, Dorset, England	Engineering ROF	
ROF Queniborough	Queniborough, Leicestershire, England	Filling Factory	Filling Factory No. 10
ROF Radway Green	near Alsager, Cheshire, England	SAA Factory	No. 13
ROF Ranskill	Ranskill, Nottinghamshire, England	Explosive ROF	
ROF Risley	Risley, Cheshire, England	Filling Factory	Filling Factory No. 6
ROF Rotherwas	Rotherwas, Herefordshire, England	Filling Factory	Filling Factory No. 4
ROF Ruddington	Ruddington, Nottinghamshire, England	Filling Factory	Filling Factory No. 14
ROF Sellafield (later the nuclear establishment Sellafield)	Sellafield, Cumbria, England	Explosive ROF	
ROF Southall	Southall, London, England	SAA Filling Factory	
ROF Summerfield	Birmingham, West Midlands, England	SAA Filling Factory	
ROF Spennymoor	Spennymoor, County Durham, England	SAA Factory	No. 21
ROF Steeton	Steeton, West Yorkshire, England	SAA Factory	No. 22
ROF Swynnerton	Swynnerton, Staffordshire, England	Filling Factory	Filling Factory No. 5
ROF Theale	Theale, Berkshire, England	Engineering ROF	
ROF Thorp Arch	Thorp Arch, West Yorkshire, England	Filling Factory	Filling Factory No. 9
ROF Wrexham	Wrexham, Wales	Explosive ROF	

== See also ==
- Filling Factories in the United Kingdom
