= Cold Meece railway station =

Former railway station in Staffordshire, England

Cold Meece

General information
- Location: Cold Meece, Stafford; England
- Coordinates: 52°53′25″N 2°13′03″W
- Grid reference: SJ 854 325
- Platforms: 4

Other information
- Status: Disused

History
- Original company: London, Midland and Scottish Railway

Key dates
- 10 August 1941: Opened
- 27 June 1958: Last train
- 3 August 1959: Closed
Location

Cold Meece railway station was a short-lived railway station built during the Second World War by the London, Midland and Scottish Railway (LMS) to serve ROF Swynnerton.

== History ==
ROF Swynnerton was a Royal Ordnance filling factory built in 1939–40. It became operational in the middle of 1940 and by mid 1942 the number of people working at the site had grown to approximately 18,500. To meet the need of getting the factory workers to and from the factory the Ministry of Supply asked the LMS to construct a station. The site already had an extensive rail network served from the West Coast Main Line between Crewe and Stafford but the LMS chose to build a new branch line running to the site from the North Staffordshire Railway line between Stone and Norton Bridge. The branch line, which was double track throughout, ran for just under 2 miles (3.2 km) from Swinnerton Junction to Cold Meece station.

The station had four platforms with run round roads between the two groups of two platform lines; station buildings were of brick construction. The station was for passenger traffic only and no goods facilities were ever provided, all freight movements for the factory were dealt with via the West Coast Main Line link.

After the war ended the factory and station both continued in use until 1958. The factory closed in May 1958 and although the last scheduled train ran in June 1958, the station did not officially close until August 1959. The branch had been lifted by September 1963.

== Passenger services ==
During the war the factory worked 24 hours a day and the passenger service to Cold Meece reflected this with nineteen trains a day, Monday to Saturday, serving the station in time for the shift changes at 5:35 am, 1:35 pm and 8:35 pm. Services ran to and from three main destinations; Newchapel and Goldenhill, Silverdale and Blythe Bridge picking up at all stations en route except those between Stoke-on-Trent and Stone. In addition there was one service each way classed as a recreational service for people who lived on the site to get into Stoke. Sunday services comprised two trains each way to Silverdale and Blythe Bridge and three each way to Newchapel and Goldenhill.

From October 1945 on the need for the number of trains decreased as the factory moved to one shift only and the number of trains each way was reduced to eight plus the recreational service. This number was further reduced to three trains each way per day (one to each of the three destinations). From the end of November 1947 the recreational service and Saturday afternoon services had been withdrawn, the remaining services remained the pattern until closure. The last Silverdale and Blythe Bridge services ran in March 1958 and the last Newchapel and Goldenhill ran on 27 June 1958.

As the trains were only run for the workers at the factory and due to the nature of the factory work, they were classed as workmen's trains (Note: A workman's train was a train run specifically for workers often very early or very late in the day and attracting reduced fares.) and did not appear in public timetables.
