= ROF Ranskill =

Former British Army ministry in England

Coordinates: 53.381°N 1.000°W

The Royal Ordnance Factory ROF Ranskill was a United Kingdom Ministry of Supply, World War II, Explosive ROF. It was built to manufacture cordite and the site was located adjacent to what is now known as the East Coast Main Line railway at Ranskill, Nottinghamshire, just north of the town of Retford.

== Background ==
In 1939 to increase the production of solventless cordite for WW2 alongside the propellant R.O.F.s (Royal Ordnance Factory) at Wrexham and Bishopton a new production site was urgently needed. (cordite is a family of smokeless propellants developed and produced in the UK since 1889 to replace gunpowder as a projectile propellant). A suitable site was required; and for safety reasons in the event of an explosion, it must be far from populated and industrial areas. It also required good road and rail access together with an accessible labour force. This site also needed a supply of cooling water, so a nearby river was essential.

Ministry of Works Surveys indicated a suitable site near Retford, at Danes Hill between Lound and Ranskill being the perfect location. The land requisition covered 517 acres (209 ha) south of, and 366 acres (148 ha) north of the road between Lound and Torworth and within an electrified security fence a factory area of 450 acres (180 ha). In addition, 6.8 acres adjacent to the River Idle at Bellmoor for a water settling lagoon, 13 acres at Ranskill for a hostel, 12 acres at Lound crossroads for staff bungalows (six for the Fire Brigade and Police, and eight for senior staff) and 40 acres at Mattersey Thorpe.

To house the workforce from outside the area for married couples’ bungalows were built on a 40-acre site at Mattersey Thorpe. Single personnel were housed in hostels and social buildings on a 13-acre site at Ranskill, while staff requiring accommodation were put up in two houses in Lound, ‘Highfield House’ and ‘White Lodge’.

The public were excluded from the site so ‘stopping up’ orders were made to close the Lound to Torworth road together with the footpath from Manor Farm in Sutton diagonally across the site to Danes Hill Farm. For the construction of the factory much of the material came by rail, the nearest delivery point being Ranskill Station. Road access to Ranskill Station and the R.O.F. site was vital. As Danes Hill Farm was central, Bridge Road (beach tree avenue past the site) was extended to join Common Lane at Ranskill and to the station.

Owing to heavy main line rail traffic over the level crossing, further land adjoining the Ranskill sidings was taken, giving direct access connection from the main line north bound at Ranskill and south bound at Torworth into the eight goods and two passenger sidings and into the factory.

Cordite production ceased in 1945, but the site was retained by the ministry on "care and maintenance" basis for another 30 years. Few of the war-time buildings survive and site has been used as a waste disposal site for years.

== Construction and production ==
Approval for the construction of ROF Ranskill was given was granted in December 1940; and it was built with the Ministry of Works acting as Agents. It was designed, as an almost self-contained, explosive factory producing Cordite, with its own acids plant. It was connected to the national railway network, with its own private sidings.

It was the last Cordite-producing Royal Ordnance Factory to be built in the UK in World War II and was the smallest of the three Cordite ROFs, covering about 494 acres (200 ha). The other two propellant factories being ROF Bishopton and ROF Wrexham. Cordite production at Ranskill commenced in March 1942; and the site took 18 months to reach maximum production. It employed, at maximum production, some 4,000 people.

Once the plant had been constructed, it could produce 300 tons a week of soventless cordite of different diameters to suit the many types of military weapons in use.

== Care and maintenance ==
Production of cordite ceased in 1945, at the end of World War II, but the site was retained by the ROF organisation until 1975 on a "care and maintenance" basis, firstly under the administration of ROF Bishopton and in the latter years by ROF Bridgwater. Cocroft notes that an RDX plant was installed there sometime in the 1950s. The production plant at ROF Ranskill was broken up from 1975 with useful spares for (presumably) the RDX plant being sent to ROF Bridgwater before the site was handed over to what was to later to become the Defence Estates for disposal.

In 1976 a squadron of RTC (Reserve Training Corps) used the site for a short time. Finally, in the late 1970s and early 1980’s the site was decontaminated and dismantled. The large buildings on the north side together with the large water storage tanks adjacent to the Matersey road were demolished. All surface bunkers on were levelled, where possible land being returned to farming. The old gravel pits on the west were landscaped and turned into Danes Hill Lakes. The south side was also landscaped and planted with conifer trees. In the 1990’s the northwest area, (train sidings from Torworth and gun cotton sheds) was turned into a Nottinghamshire County Council land-fill disposal site.
