= ROF Leeds =

UK World War II Royal Ordnance Factory

Coordinates: 53°48′24.0″N 1°26′02.2″W

Royal Ordnance Factory (ROF) Leeds, first opened as a munitions factory in December 1915 and opened as an ROF in January 1936, was one of a number of Royal Ordnance Factories created at the start of the Second World War.

== Early site history and production ==
=== First World War ===
ROF Engineering Factory opened as National Filling Factory No. 1 (Barnbow) in December 1915. Barnbow was Britain's top shell factory between 1914 and 1918, and by the end of the war on 11 November 1918, a total of 566,000 tons of ammunition had been shipped overseas.

== Second World War ==
=== Conversion to an Engineering ROF ===
In the late 1930s, war was seen as a possibility, if not likely, and a sizeable rearmament programme began, probably also activated by the concern that a large proportion of the arsenal was becoming obsolete.

== Post-war activity ==
=== Immediate post-war era ===
In November 1945 full production began on the uparmoured Centurion Mark II with an order of 800. Production lines at Leyland, the Royal Ordnance Factories at Leeds and Woolwich, and Vickers at Elswick were used. The tank entered service in December 1946 with the 5th Royal Tank Regiment.

=== Later years ===
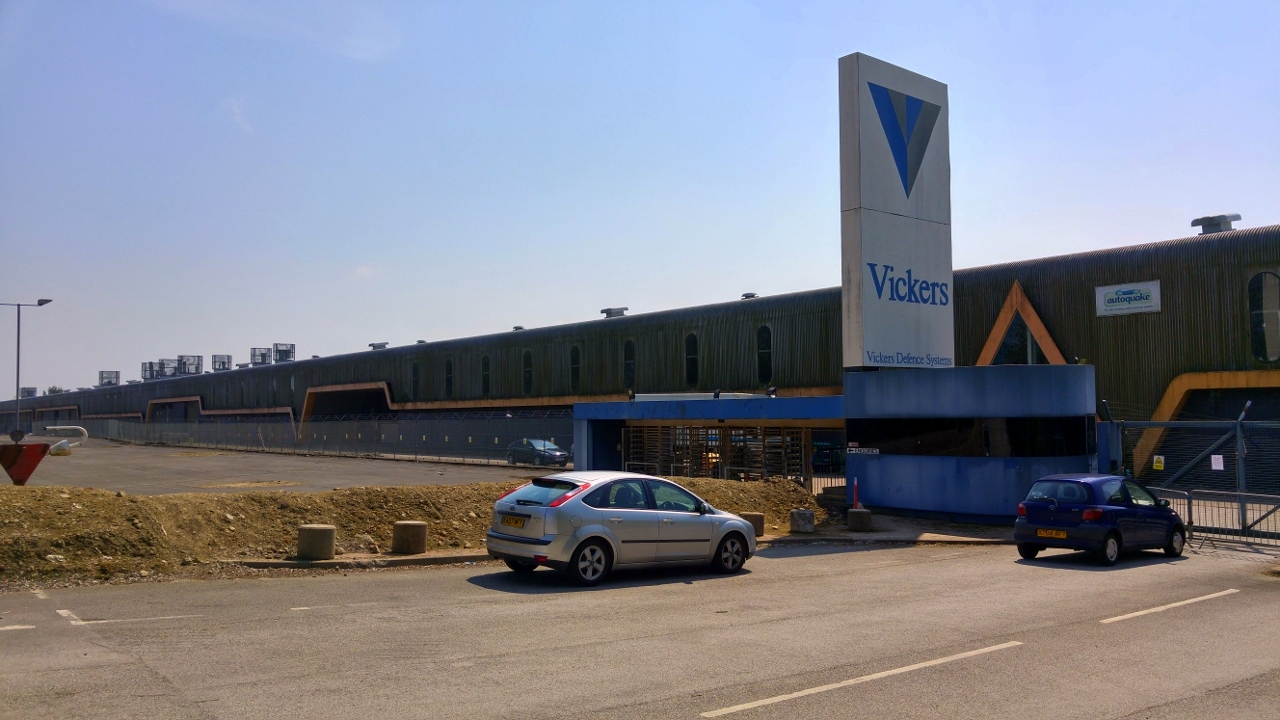
Entrance to the grounds of the closed factory (2016)

The Chieftain Tank was built for many years at ROF Leeds. The site also built lighter vehicles with aluminium armour, such as the Fox armoured reconnaissance vehicle and the FV180 Combat Engineer Tractor. The Challenger was built by the Royal Ordnance Factories (ROF). In 1986, ROF Leeds (and the Challenger production line) was acquired by Vickers Defence Systems (later Alvis Vickers).

== Privatisation of Royal Ordnance ==
On 2 January 1985, vesting day, the twelve ROFs that still remained open, plus the Waltham Abbey South site, RSAF Enfield and three agency factories, became a UK government-owned company: Royal Ordnance plc. Its headquarters was moved to ROF Chorley, Lancashire; with its registered office located in central London. The intention of the government at this stage was to privatise Royal Ordnance as soon as possible through a stock market flotation.

In mid-1985 a target date of July 1986 was set; however, by June 1986 the government announced that flotation would not be possible and that it intended to sell the company privately. The following problems were identified as barriers to a flotation:

- The future of ROF Leeds, notably the uncertain future due to over-capacity in UK main battle tank production.
- The future relationship between the MOD and the company.
- The financial position of the company.
- Liabilities regarding a contract with British Aerospace

The problems associated with ROF Leeds were solved when Royal Ordnance agreed the sale of the factory and intellectual property rights of the Challenger tanks to Vickers plc on 4 October 1986, the final agreement was signed on 31 March 1987 valuing ROF Leeds at £15.2 million. Vickers became Alvis Vickers and, in 2004, became part of BAE Systems, and the Leeds factory was closed. The relationship with the MOD was resolved by certain guarantees given to the company by the MOD regarding future procurement strategies. The financial position of the company was resolved by a Treasury cash injection and the proceeds of the ROF Leeds sale. The liabilities were with regard to a sub-contract for a missile systems between British Aerospace (BAe) and an MOD research establishment transferred to Royal Ordnance on Incorporation; BAe and the MOD reached agreement in February 1987.

Bids for Royal Ordnance plc were invited in October 1986, resulting in six offers. These were eventually reduced to two; one from British Aerospace and one from Guest, Keen & Nettlefolds (GKN). The £188.5 million GBP BAe offer was accepted, and the sale was completed on 22 April 1987.

== Closure ==
ROF Leeds was closed in 2004 and the land was sold for housing. Following the closure and subsequent demolition of the site, very few physical remnants of the factory remain. The Barnbow Social Club, located on the eastern edge of the former site, is now believed to be the last remaining original building associated with the Barnbow munitions and tank factory. Originally opened in 1951 as a paint store, and later becoming a welfare facility for factory workers and their families, the club continues to operate as a community venue. It preserves a direct link to the site's industrial and wartime history and will celebrate its 75th anniversary in 2026.

== See also ==
- Barnbow
- Board of Ordnance
- List of Royal Ordnance Factories
- Royal Ordnance Factory
- Royal Ordnance
- Royal Small Arms Factory

== Sources ==
- Munro, Bill (2005). The Centurion Tank. Crowood Press. ISBN 1-86126-701-0.
