= ROF Pembrey =

Explosive factory in South Wales

Coordinates: 51.679°N 4.293°W

A World War I explosive factory, which was to be later known as NEF Pembrey was built, by Nobel's Explosives, with British Government approval, near the village of Pembrey, Carmarthenshire, Wales. The factory was built on a site consisting of mainly sandhills and sand dunes to provide some protection against damage caused by an explosion. Its main product was TNT (Trinitrotoluene) used for shell filling. The same site was used in World War II to build another explosive factory ROF Pembrey, which also made TNT.

Like all explosives factories, they needed a guaranteed year-round supply of water and good transport links. The site was connected to the Great Western Railway at Pembrey.

== Nineteenth-century dynamite factory ==
A dynamite factory appears to have been built on a 155-acre (63 ha) site at Pembrey in 1882 by the New Explosive Company of Stowmarket; it was bought by their competitors, Nobel's Explosives Company, in 1886 / 1887 and production was partially run-down. Ownership was then transferred to the South Wales Explosive Company, a subsidiary of Nobel's.

== World War I: NEF Pembrey ==
The site was then used by Nobel's Explosives to build a TNT / propellant factory in 1914 with Government approval. Its construction was a response to the need to drastically increase the production of shells in World War I (see Shell Crisis of 1915). The Pembrey site was one of the first purpose-built TNT manufacturing sites, in the United Kingdom, in World War I. The factory was initially owned by Nobel's Explosives, but in 1917 it was taken over by the Ministry of Munitions and it became a National Explosives Factory (NEF Pembrey).

It produced 15,000 tons of TNT and 20,000 tons of propellant. The site was described as some 760 acres (310 ha).

After the end of World War I, it closed and the administration building became a convalescence home for children from the families of unemployed miners. Its water supply works were taken over by the nearby town of Llanelli and used to supply the town with water.

== World War II: ROF Pembrey ==
Work started in July 1938 to build a new factory on the site, with the Ministry of Works acting as Agents. It opened in December 1939 under the control of the Ministry of Supply as one of several explosive Royal Ordnance Factories making TNT. Unlike the other TNT ROF's, however, ROF Pembrey also made tetryl and ammonium nitrate. Some 3,000 people were employed there in World War II.

After the end of World War II, it continued to manufacture TNT and tetryl for military use; and ammonium nitrate for agricultural use as a fertiliser.

From 1944 onwards, ROF Pembrey undertook breakdown of surplus ammunition, such as 4.5 inch anti-aircraft shells and 500 lb (230 kg) bombs. The TNT being steamed out and then burnt.

The chemical properties of explosive products manufactured or otherwise handled here, including TNT and ammonium nitrate, were continually sampled and tested in the chemical laboratory by technicians known as Junior Analysts. They included young women who were exposed to these hazardous materials on a daily basis. The title of Junior Analyst is still (2009) cited as a qualification for employment advertised in the region.

== Closure and disposal ==
ROF Pembrey closed towards the end of 1964.

In July 1965 the majority of the site, 516 acres (209 ha) of leasehold land, was returned to the Forestry Commission and now forms Pembrey Country Park; and 96 acres (39 ha) of freehold land was sold to a construction company.
