= Royal Naval Cordite Factory, Holton Heath =

Former factory in Dorset, England

Coordinates: 50°42′58″N 2°4′23″W

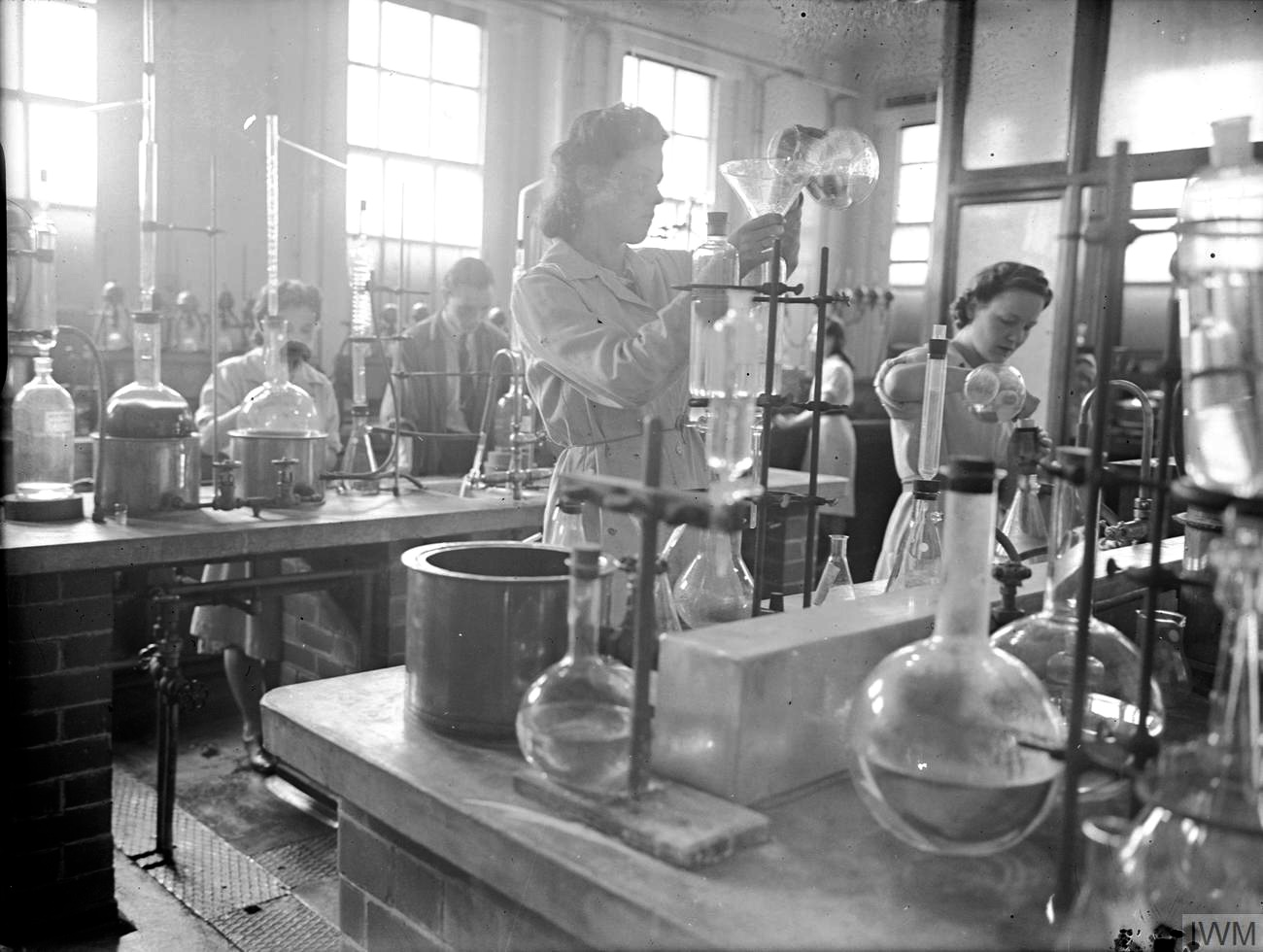
Analytical chemists testing samples of cordite during World War II

The Royal Naval Cordite Factory, Holton Heath (RNCF) was set up at Holton Heath, Dorset, England, in World War I to manufacture cordite for the Royal Navy. It was reactivated in World War II to manufacture gun propellants for the Admiralty; and its output was supplemented by the Royal Navy Propellant Factory, Caerwent.

After the end of World War II, the explosive manufacturing areas of the site were closed down and some areas of the site reopened as the Admiralty Materials Laboratory. A major part of the explosives site became a nature reserve in 1981. Other parts of the site were converted into an industrial estate, and some may be used for housing.

The Admiralty Materials Laboratory was later merged with other departments to become the Admiralty Research Establishment which later became part of Defence Research Agency (DRA); and DRA Holton Heath finally closed in the late 1990s. None of the site is now owned by the Ministry of Defence.

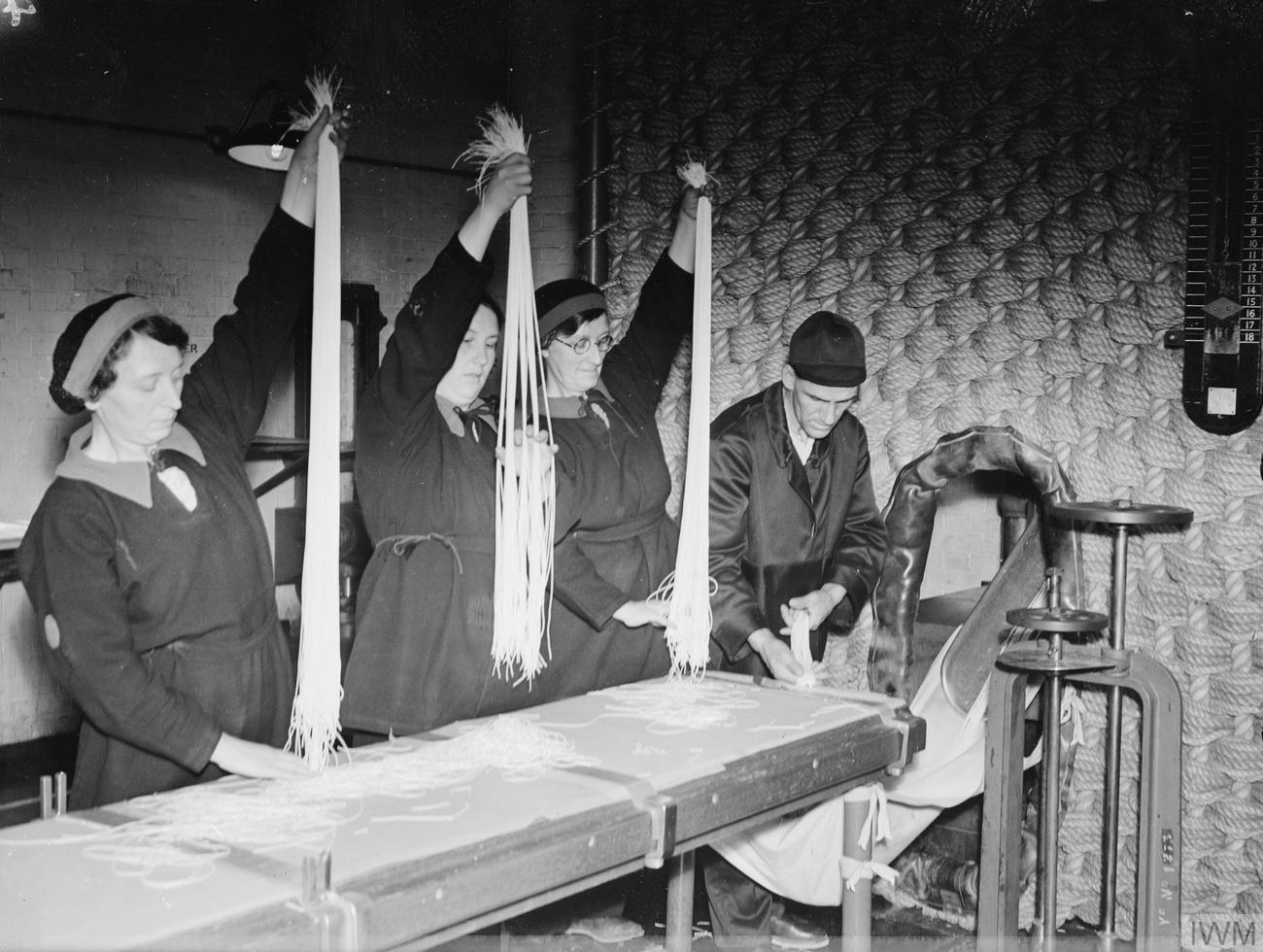
Royal Naval Cordite Factory, Holton Heath

== The site ==
A site was needed because Winston Churchill, the First Lord of the Admiralty, insisted that the Royal Navy had their independent supply of Cordite. The Army was to be supplied with Cordite from the HM Factory, Gretna, at Gretna, Scotland, another remote location. Holton Heath was chosen in 1914 because of its remote location, away from centres of population, and its good transportation links, on a backwater of Poole Harbour, adjacent to the London and South Western Railway, and the A351 Wareham to Poole road.

During construction and during World War I, it was guarded by a detachment of armed Metropolitan Police. After World War I, the site was guarded by the Royal Marine Police; and later the Ministry of Defence Police. There were several scares and false alarms during construction, i.e. claims that various builder's and contractor's English or Irish employees were German spies or saboteurs. All these claims had to be investigated. In 1935, during the Re-armament Period, a new nitroglycerin plant was bought from Cologne, Germany, and installed by German technicians. It was necessary for the police to guard them, as they may otherwise have been attacked due to resentment about the rise in power of Nazi Germany and memories of World War I.

The bridge which formerly carried the cordite factory railway over the LSWR near Rockley Jetty

The main site was bounded by the A351, Station Road and the London and South Western Railway. Holton Heath railway station was opened to serve the RNCF, which was linked to the railway by a siding which entered the site just east of the station. A few administration buildings were built on the other side of Station Road. A coal-fired water pumping house was also built away from the main site, at Corfe Mullen, to pump water from the River Stour. Supplied with coal from its own railway siding on the Somerset and Dorset Railway, which passed nearby, it was linked to a 3.5 million gallon reservoir inside the RNCF by a 16-inch water main.

A jetty, Rockley Jetty, was also constructed in Poole Harbour just outside the main site. It was used to load Cordite onto boats for transport to Priddy's Hard, in Gosport. The jetty was linked into the factory's railway system using standard gauge track. This private track ran parallel to the London and South Western Railway (LSWR) for some distance. It crossed over the top of the LSWR by means of a bridge. As of 2023 the bridge was still visible on Google Maps.

== World War I ==
=== Chaim Weizmann and acetone ===
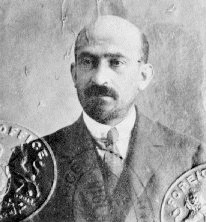
Chaim Weizmann

Production of Cordite required large volumes of the solvent acetone and this was in short supply. At the time, acetone was manufactured by destructive distillation of wood. Chaim Weizmann had developed a process of bacterial fermentation, using Clostridium acetobutylicum, in 1912 but it did not appear to have any commercial value.

Weizmann was introduced to David Lloyd George, Minister of Munitions, and Winston Churchill in 1915 and was given facilities to develop the process. He used a laboratory at the Lister Institute in London and industrial plant at Nicholson's gin distillery in Bow (Three Mills) to perfect it.

A full-scale acetone plant was set up at the RNCF using bacterial fermentation of grain. By 1917 there was a shortage of grain so horse chestnuts were used as an alternative source of starch. School children were asked by the Ministry of Munitions to collect horse chestnuts, and six huge concrete storage silos were built to store them. A larger bacterial fermentation plant was also set up in Canada as they had more maize than the United Kingdom.

After the end of World War I the bacterial fermentation plant was demolished but the silos were kept. In World War II the basements of RNCF silos were converted to air-raid shelters; and the silos were filled with earth to provide protection from any falling incendiary devices. Six of the silos survived beyond the closure of the Holton Heath site; and they are listed in the Scheduled Monument schedule issued by English Heritage, for the Royal Naval Cordite Factory at Holton Heath, on 25th June 2001.

== World War II ==
During the Second World War, the site was a target for German bombers and so a plan to protect it was instigated. This consisted of creating several "Starfish" decoy sites in the village of Arne, three miles to the southeast, containing flammable material that would be ignited to give the appearance of a burning building. This was put to the test on the night of 3–4 June 1942 when bombers dropped hundreds of bombs on the decoy site, practically destroying the village of Arne, but leaving the Cordite Factory unscathed.

Note: The Royal Navy Cordite Factory, Holton Heath, like the Royal Navy Propellant Factory, Caerwent, was never part of the Ministry of Supply / Royal Ordnance Factory management chain; both factories were controlled by the Admiralty. However, they were functionally very similar to the Explosive ROFs.

== Post-war use ==
After the end of World War II, propellant manufacture ceased at Holton Heath, although Caerwent continued to produce Cordite.

The camp was also used as the fictitious "Sandford Army Camp" in the UK television series Bad Lads Army: Extreme in 2006.

== Secrecy of the installation ==
The site was to the north-northeast of Holton Heath station, which was opened during the First World War to allow staff to reach the works. However, the site's location was omitted from WW2 Ordnance Survey maps as can be seen on this side-by-side comparison of the 1940s New Popular Edition 1 inch map with the same area from the 7th Series from a decade or so later..

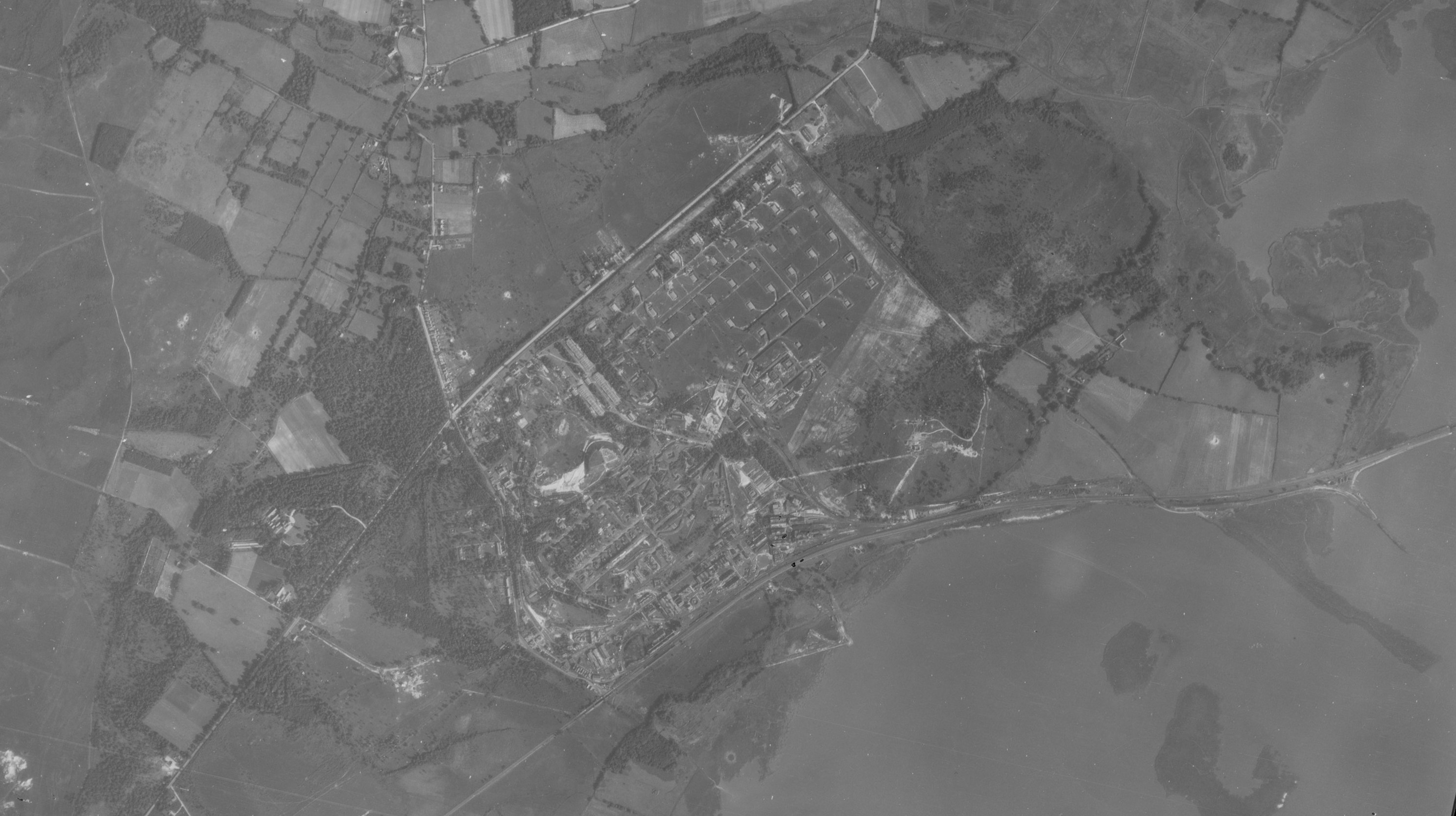
Luftwaffe reconnaissance photograph of Holton Heath factory site taken on 28 August 1942

Despite this precaution, the Germans were well aware of the facility. The RNCF had a dedicated Luftwaffe target dossier, GB 76 11, and it appears in multiple Luftwaffe air reconnaissance photographs in August/September 1942.

== Accidents ==
On 10 September 1927, an explosion killed three men working in an acetone recovery building. Acetone, used as a solvent in the cordite manufacturing process, was piped in vapour form from stoves to the store where it would be recovered for re-use. It was accidentally ignited in the pipe, causing the explosion.

On Thursday 07 November 1929 an explosion in the cordite press house at the factory seriously injured four workers, one of whom died in hospital on 09 November.

On 23 June 1931, an explosion occurred in a nitroglycerin preparation chamber, killing 10 and injuring 19. Three buildings were destroyed and a storage tank was ruptured, spilling sulphuric acid into the area. The explosion, which occurred at 10.45 am, was heard 20 miles away and people working outdoors 2 miles away were knocked over by the blast wave. Houses situated on the main road approximately 1 mile from the blast suffered extensive damage.

== Memorial ==
On 23 June 2015 – marking the 84th anniversary of the major explosion of 1931 – a memorial stone was unveiled and dedicated by Rod Hughes, Jill Charman and Geoff Charman of the Holton Heath Memorial Group. The dedication service was taken by the Revd. Jean de Garis of Lytchett Minster and was attended by relatives of the deceased and ex-employees. The stone was unveiled by Jill Charman, whose grandfather Robert Rubie Taylor was one of the 10 men killed in the 1931 disaster. Hughes said: "The Royal Navy Cordite Factory was not simply a place, or merely a factory of stone and wood, but a community. Close-knit by common goals and purpose. Embodied in this stone is the story of that community."
