= ROF Elstow =

Coordinates: 52.0870°N 0.4755°W

Royal Ordnance Factory (ROF) Elstow was one of sixteen UK Ministry of Supply, World War II, Filling Factories. It was a medium-sized filling factory, Filling Factory No. 16, which filled and packed munitions. It was located south of the town of Bedford, between the villages of Elstow and Wilstead in Bedfordshire. It was bounded on the northeast by the A6 and on the west by a railway line. Hostels were built nearby to accommodate the workers who were mostly female.

It was built with the Ministry of Works acting as Agents; building work started in November 1940 and was completed by August 1941. It was managed as an "Agency Factory" by J. Lyons on behalf of the Ministry of Supply as, by then, the Ministry of Supply was overstretched as regards recruiting and managing the workers needed to staff these munitions factories.

It had 250 buildings and the site does not appear on Ordnance Survey maps made during wartime or in the postwar period.

== Railway system ==
There were 15 miles of standard gauge railway lines which were linked to the London, Midland and Scottish Railway (former Midland Railway) line running between London and Bedford. The junction was controlled from a signal box called Wilshamstead Junction. On the site a small platform called "Wilshamstead" was built to accommodate workmen's trains which ran from Bedford from 6 August 1941 (and Luton from 6 October 1941) until May 1946.

== Wartime production ==
ROF Elstow started filling munitions in February 1942.

It was divided into a number of different filling Groups (see Filling Factories) which occupied different areas of the site. The Groups filled cartridges, high-explosive (HE) and 4,000-pound bombs and shells. Later larger 8,000-pound, 12,000-pound and 22,000-pound bombs were also filled.

The Cordite Group opened in June 1942 and closed in May 1943; it was then employed to recondition shells. The Pellet Group also closed in 1943. After 1943 Elstow was used to store surplus ammunition components and machine tools.

== Closure ==
ROF Elstow closed in 1946. The CEGB took over the site in 1969 with the intention of building a power station but this never came to fruition.

In the early 1980s Elstow was proposed as a site for a UK nuclear waste repository. In 2007 work began on the new town of Wixams on the site. In the process of applying for planning permission for the Wixams development, a survey of the site was carried out which included interviews with former workers. The report, with site maps and annotated photographs, was published in 2009.
