= ROF Thorp Arch =

UK World War II Royal Ordnance Factory

Coordinates: 53.916°N 1.319°W

ROF Thorp Arch was one of sixteen British government-owned Royal Ordnance Factories that operated during the Second World War. It was a medium-sized filling factory (Filling Factory No. 9), which produced munitions by "filling" them.

It was located on the banks of the River Wharfe, north-east of the two villages of Boston Spa and Thorp Arch; and four miles (6.4 km) south-east of the town of Wetherby, West Yorkshire in England.

== Design and production ==
=== War time ===
The Royal Ordnance Factory was constructed for the Ministry of Supply, with the Ministry of Works acting as agents. The site was connected to the London & North Eastern Railway line, which was used in its construction and then for supplying raw materials to the factory and for transporting away filled munitions.

Construction work on Thorp Arch began on 18 May 1940 and the completion date was scheduled for the end of July 1941. The site was divided into a number of separate Filling Groups which occupied different areas of the site and were devoted to filling specific type of ammunition. It produced munitions for both the Army and the Royal Air Force. It is believed to have had 619 buildings.

In the Second World War it produced light gun ammunition, medium gun ammunition, heavy ammunition, land mines and trench mortar ammunition for the Army; medium and large bombs for the RAF; and, 20 mm and other small arms ammunition for all three services. Some of these were produced in quantities measured in millions and hundreds of millions of items.

=== Post-war ===
ROF Thorp Arch closed down twice: firstly, after the end of the Second World War; and then finally, in April 1958 four years after the end of the Korean War, as a result of planned cuts in the British Army published in the 1957 Defence White Paper.

== Current use ==
Part of the site is now in use as the Thorp Arch Trading Estate.

The British Library operates its Northern Reading Room, Northern Listening Service, and Document Supply Centre on the site.

Another part is a prison, originally HMP Thorp Arch, now HMP Wealstun.

== See also ==
- List of prisons in the United Kingdom
- List of Royal Ordnance Factories
