= ROF Patricroft =

Munitions factory in Lancashire, England

Coordinates: 53°29′N 2°22′W

ROF Patricroft was a Royal Ordnance Factory in Patricroft, near the town of Eccles (then in Lancashire, now part of Salford, Greater Manchester), England.

The factory, classified as a Medium Machine Shop, was situated adjacent to both the Liverpool & Manchester Railway and the Bridgewater Canal. Opened in 1941 on an existing site, It remained in use as a Royal Ordnance Factory until the late 1980s.

== Establishment and prior site use ==
On 1 June 1940, The Ministry of Supply took over an existing engineering works to convert it into a Royal Ordnance Factory (ROF).

The Bridgewater Foundry had been the main site of machine tool and locomotive manufacturer Nasmyth, Gaskell & Company, founded in 1836. It had stopped manufacturing locomotives in 1938, but continued on a smaller scale making steam hammers and machine tools until the company ceased trading in November 1940.

Staff from the Royal Arsenal, Woolwich, acted as agents for the Ministry of Supply in taking over the site, and it reopened as an ROF in February 1941. The site consisted of a square mill-like building, known as The Tower, and various surrounding buildings including a machine shop, a foundry and a blacksmith's shop.

== Wartime production ==
ROF Patricroft was opened during World War II to supplement the work of the Royal Arsenal, Woolwich. Some 3,000 men and women were employed at ROF Patricroft during the war.

Parts for the Bofors 40 mm gun were manufactured. Other buildings on the site were used to fabricate welded parts, particularly oil tanks to enable steam locomotives to run on oil instead of coal.

== Post-war production ==
Patricroft was at the forefront of manufacturing rocket motors for missiles such as such as ALARM, Harpoon, Sea Wolf and Sea Dart. Patricroft had developed advanced machining to cover many aspects of ammunition and missile systems. Patricroft also had capabilities in advanced flow forming, Electro Slag Refining (ESR) and vertical forging of Chieftain tank gun barrels.

== Closure ==
ROF Patricroft was privatised in 1984 along with a number of Royal Ordnance Factories to become a constituent part of Royal Ordnance Plc, which was later bought in April 1987 by British Aerospace (BAe). Shortly afterwards, in 1988 and 1989, respectively, both the Royal Small Arms Factory at Enfield Lock, London, and the Patricroft site were closed down and sold off for redevelopment.

The former Royal Ordnance Factory is now part of a business and technology centre, Nasmyth Business Centre.

== See also ==
- List of Royal Ordnance Factories
- Royal Ordnance Factory
