= Explosive ROFs =

An explosive ROF was a UK government-owned Royal Ordnance Factory (ROF), which specialised in manufacturing explosives during and after World War II. In World War I, the name used in the UK for government-owned explosives factories was National Explosives Factory; the cordite factory at Gretna was known as HM Factory, Gretna.

These Second World War factories were built for the Ministry of Supply with the Ministry of Works, in all cases except ROF Irvine, acting as agent. Explosive ROFs specialised in producing either high-explosives, such as TNT (trinitrotoluene) or RDX; or propellants, such as cordite, but there were minor exceptions to this demarcation. The products from these explosive ROFs were shipped to filling factories for filling into munitions.

Pyrotechnics, such as fuses and screening smokes, tended to be made at the Filling Factories and filled directly into munitions.

== Comparable WW II factories not part of the ROF organisation ==
=== ICI and Ministry of Supply agency factories ===
A number of UK World War II explosives factories were built and owned by ICI. These privately owned explosives factories were not considered part of the ROF organisation and they were not called ROFs. ICI also managed numerous munitions factories constructed with Ministry of Supply funding; these were known as agency factories. ICI Nobel's Ardeer site and its World War II agency factories produced, for example, 35% of the combined ROF and Agency Factories output of Cordite and 15% of the combined output of TNT.

=== Royal Naval Factories ===
In both World War I and II the Royal Navy had its own government-owned factories producing propellants and explosives, for naval guns. These were the Royal Navy Cordite Factory, Holton Heath (RNCF), Dorset (World War I & World War II), and the Royal Navy Propellant Factory, Caerwent (RNPF), Monmouthshire (World War II only), respectively. They both were closed as explosive manufacturing sites after World War II. Naval propellants were then manufactured at ROF Bishopton and filled at ROF Chorley, and later ROF Glascoed.

== National Explosives Factories (WW I) ==
- HM Factory, Gretna
- NEF Pembrey
- Barnbow National Filling Factory No 1, later ROF Barnbow

To be expanded

== Royal Navy Factories (WW I and WW II) ==
- Royal Navy Cordite Factory, Holton Heath (RNCF)
- Royal Navy Propellant Factory, Caerwent (RNPF)

== UK high-explosive ROFs (WW II) ==
- ROF Bridgwater
- ROF Drigg
- ROF Irvine
- ROF Pembrey

== Propellant ROFs (WW II) ==
- ROF Bishopton
- ROF Ranskill
- ROF Sellafield
- ROF Wrexham
