= ROF Bridgwater =

Former factory between the villages of Puriton and Woolavington

Coordinates: 51.17783°N 2.95557°W

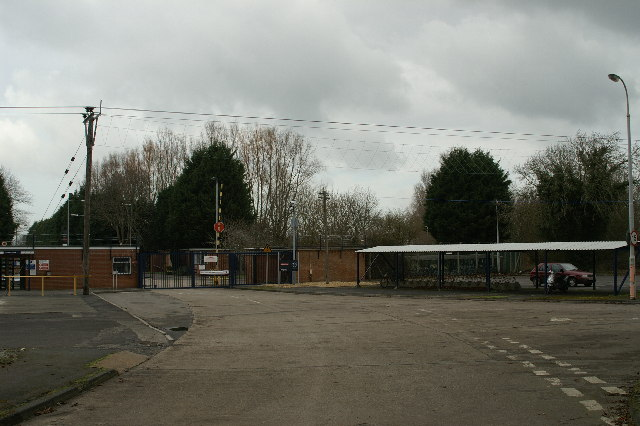
Entrance to BAE Systems, Bridgwater

Royal Ordnance Factory (ROF) Bridgwater was a factory between the villages of Puriton and Woolavington in the Sedgemoor district of Somerset, England, that produced high explosives for munitions. It was slightly above sea level, between the 5-and-10-metre (16 and 33 ft) contour lines on Ordnance Survey maps. BAE Systems closed it when decommissioning was completed in July 2008.

== History ==
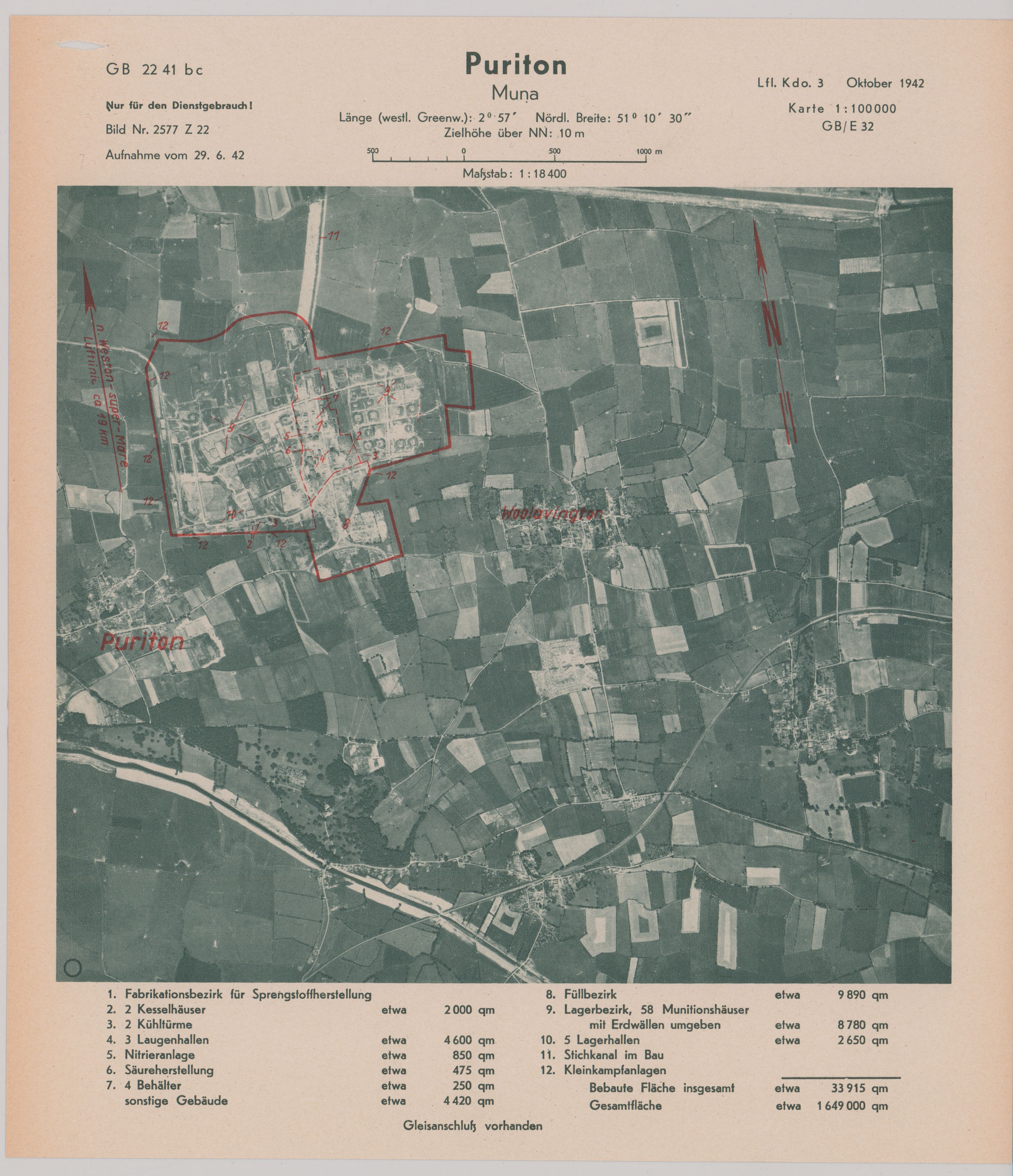
ROF Bridgwater on a target dossier of the German Luftwaffe, 1942

It was constructed early in World War II for the Ministry of Supply, with the Ministry of Works as Agents. It was designed as an Explosive ROF to produce RDX, a new experimental high-explosive developed at the RGPF Waltham Abbey. Construction work started in 1939 and it opened in 1941.

On 29 June 1951, an explosion killed six men. No cause was ever identified.

It was also known as "ROF 37", a name that was reflected in its sports and social association, the "37 Club", just outside the perimeter fence.

=== Infrastructure ===
As munitions production needed a guaranteed year-round clean water supply of several million gallons per day, the site was ideal, being able to obtain supplies from the water-logged Somerset Levels:

- the artificial Huntspill River, dug during construction;
- the King's Sedgemoor Drain, widened at the same time;
- water that accumulated due to the high water table in the "Borrow Pits", dug to produce traverses around the explosive magazines.

Both the waterways are now an integral part of the drainage system of the Somerset Levels.

The factory was essentially self-supporting other than for raw materials. It generated high-pressure steam for heating and production processes using its own coal-fired power station; it could also produce electricity using a steam turbine. During World War II before the National Grid was fully developed, it was connected to two independent power stations, Portishead (now demolished) and Shepton Mallet.

Between 1940 and 1941, housing for workers was built as "pre-fabs" in the adjacent village of Woolavington. Hostels for single workers were built at nearby Dunball, by the King's Sedgemoor Drain.

The site was guarded until shortly after privatisation by the MoD Police, which had its barracks and canteen opposite the main gates. These have long since been demolished. Three brick MoD Police houses are still in use on the Woolavington Road, but they are no longer occupied by the police.

The factory was connected to the Great Western Railway (GWR) by a private, 4 ft 8 1/2 in (1,435 mm) standard-gauge branch line and sidings with its own locomotive. This was used both for supplies, such as acid in tanker wagons from ICI and coal for the power station, and for distribution of the finished product.

A bridge was built in the early 1970s to carry the line over the M5 motorway, just north of junction 23, when the M5 was extended southwards from the M50. The line became disused after the privatisation of the ROFs and the track has been lifted. The British Rail sidings were known as Huntspill (Puriton).

=== Production ===
During the construction period it appears that the decision was made to fill munitions, including the bouncing bomb, with a mixture of TNT and RDX rather than RDX alone. The factory manufactured RDX in two separate production units, then sent to Filling Factories such as ROF Chorley and ROF Glascoed for filling into munitions. It also concentrated and re-cycled its own sulphuric acid.

Like all ROFs at the time, the factory was a production factory: formulation of explosives, propellants and munitions was carried out at separate government-owned research and development establishments such as the Research Department, initially at the Royal Arsenal, Woolwich and then Fort Halstead; and at PERME Waltham Abbey, later transferred to RARDE Fort Halstead. After privatisation Royal Ordnance PLC took over some of this capability, other parts being closed or becoming part of QinetiQ.

== Post World War II ==
During the slack period between 1945 and the Korean War the factory and ROF Chorley and ROF Glascoed built two-storey pre-fabricated concrete houses.

Post War concrete post and beam, factory-built Airey semi-detached House of the type made in the ROFs.

=== Additional capability ===
- Production of the new high explosive HMX was added in 1955.
- In the 1960s and 1970s, the factory started producing plastic rocket propellant with ammonium perchlorate and poly-isobutylene rubber as two of its main ingredients.
- Trinitrotoluene (TNT) manufacture was added in 1980.

== Privatisation ==
Royal Ordnance factories were privatised on 2 January 1985 and became part of the Explosive Division of Royal Ordnance Plc, later RO Defence. RO Defence was acquired by BAE Systems in the 1990s and was subsumed into BAE Systems Land Systems. The factory closed in July 2008.

== Future use of the site ==
In 2017, the site was bought by the merchant bank Salamanca Group in a multi-million pound deal to create Gravity, which was intended to be a 'smart campus' hosting 'low carbon' tenants. Gravity is now a subsidiary of the Salamanca Group.

In February 2024, Tata Group confirmed it would invest £4 billion to create an electric vehicle battery factory, built by Agratas, using approximately one-half of the total area of the Gravity site. Battery production was set to begin in 2026, with the creation of around 4,000 jobs.

However, as of June 2026, a permanent construction contractor had not been agreed and the latest planned production start date, January 2028, is uncertain. Some progress has been made. The gigafactory, at full capacity, was intended to consist of three identical factories, called Factory 1, 2 and 3. The construction company, Sir Robert McAlpine, has been erecting the steel framing for Factory 1 on the cleared site under an 'interim contract'; and much of the external cladding has been fitted. However, Sir Robert McAlpine was informed in June 2026 that future work will be carried out by a different type of contractor.
