= ROF Risley =

UK World War II Royal Ordnance Factory

ROF Risley, (Filling Factory No.6) was a large World War II Royal Ordnance Factory filling munitions, including the Grand Slam bomb, in the UK. It is located roughly halfway between Liverpool and Manchester.

== World War II ==
With the advent of the Second World War, 927 acres (3.8 km^{2}) of largely heath and mossland which was part of Risley village, between Leigh (then Lancashire, now Greater Manchester) and Warrington (then Lancashire, now Cheshire), was compulsorily purchased and within it was built a large Royal Ordnance Factory. The location was chosen because the low lying mist and cloud helped camouflage the factory from the air; according to a local builder: "It was very lonely and misty at night, and that's why the factory was constructed there... it was usually covered with a mist or cloud. It was hard to see it in the day time, you know". A part of the 927-acre (3.75 km^{2}) site was drained and construction began in August 1939. It took 18 months to complete, but bombs were produced from September 1940.

Risley Royal Ordnance Factory (ROF) was a filling factory. It received the explosives in bulk, usually by rail, from other ROFs where they were manufactured. Risley specialised in filling them into the various casings to produce the finished munitions. There were 16 filling factories around the country and Risley was known as Filling Factory No. 6. Others in the north west included Chorley (No. 1) and Kirkby (No. 7). One of the features common to all of the filling factories was an area of storage bunkers where the finished munitions were stored awaiting dispatch. The areas within the filling factories were all numbered in the same way. Storage bunkers were designated Area 9. Risley had 20 such bunkers and Area 9 is roughly in the area of the main field in Birchwood Forest Park today. When the new town area of Birchwood was created, most of the bunkers were demolished, but 4 of them were left in place and can still be seen today.

A number of bunkers were also built to house the munitions, to protect them from potential bombing, and also to segregate the site and reduce the consequences of any accidental explosions during manufacture or storage. Although these bunkers are on the surface, they are covered with soil and turf and so give the impression of being underground. It had a dedicated rail link to the Manchester-Wigan branch line, which was used both for bringing in workers and moving materials. Also there was a 'halt' on the Liverpool-Manchester line. In the post war years wooden coaches lay derelict there.

The actual layout of the site was far from flat, the site having several pillboxes mounted high up on earthbanks surrounding the mounds covering the bunkers. Some of the rail sidings also had huge earthworks around them.

== Post-war UKAEA era ==
However, after World War II the factory was soon overshadowed when in January 1946 the Directorate for Atomic Energy Production, under the aegis of the Ministry of Supply, was set up to produce fissile material and chose Risley to build its headquarters, under the control of Sir Christopher Hinton, Baron Hinton of Bankside. This project, to produce a nuclear weapon or A-bomb was by far the UK's biggest industrial and scientific undertaking in peacetime, requiring most of the country's top scientists and a huge budget and scale that couldn't even be contemplated these days.

The early atomic site used many of the old Royal Ordnance Factory buildings and also the dedicated raillink to the Manchester/Wigan branch line bringing in workers from Manchester.

In 1954 the Risley headquarters site was greatly expanded again with the formal establishment of the UKAEA (United Kingdom Atomic Energy Authority) heralding the beginning of the civil nuclear power program which ran alongside the military one. By this time the organisation had more than 20,000 workers. Design and construction of all other UKAEA plants was overseen here, technical policy and long term planning, finance and administration as well as world leading scientific research in physics, chemistry and engineering. The biggest increase was between 1955 and 1958 when the need for producing much more plutonium and highly enriched uranium and development of new materials such as tritium required for the H-bomb, which the Government announced it would develop in February 1955. By 1961 more than 40,000 were employed, the biggest percentage at the Risley HQ.

== Birchwood Forest Park ==
The disused area of the site was put on the market in 1963. No buyer was found for it until 1968, when the Warrington Development Corporation under government plans bought the site in preparation for building the new town of Birchwood now part of Cheshire in the mid seventies. Birchwood Forest Park is in the centre, in which some of the old bunkers from the factory form part of the landscape.
