= Cordite =

Smokeless propellant

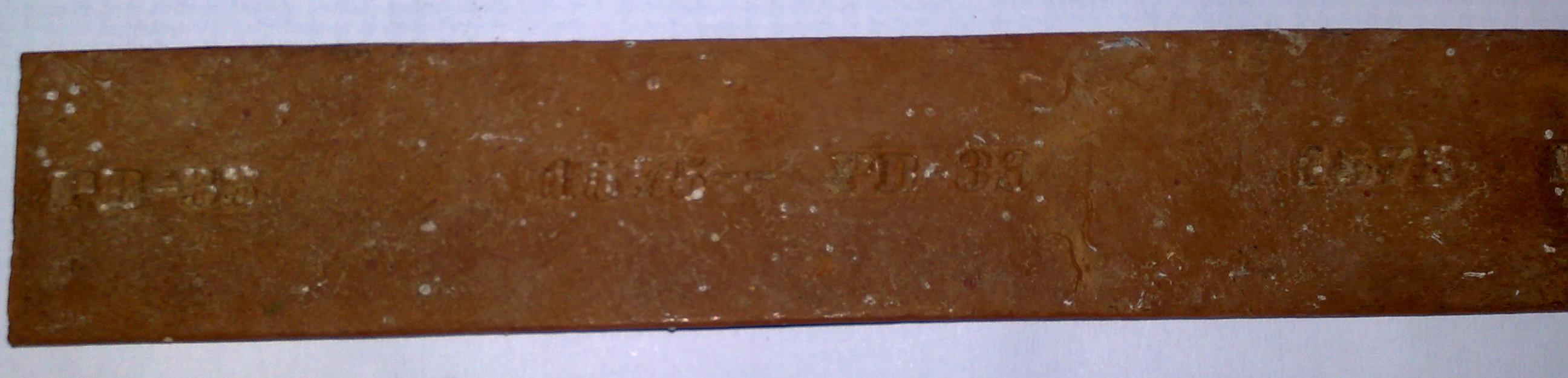
A stick of cordite from World War II

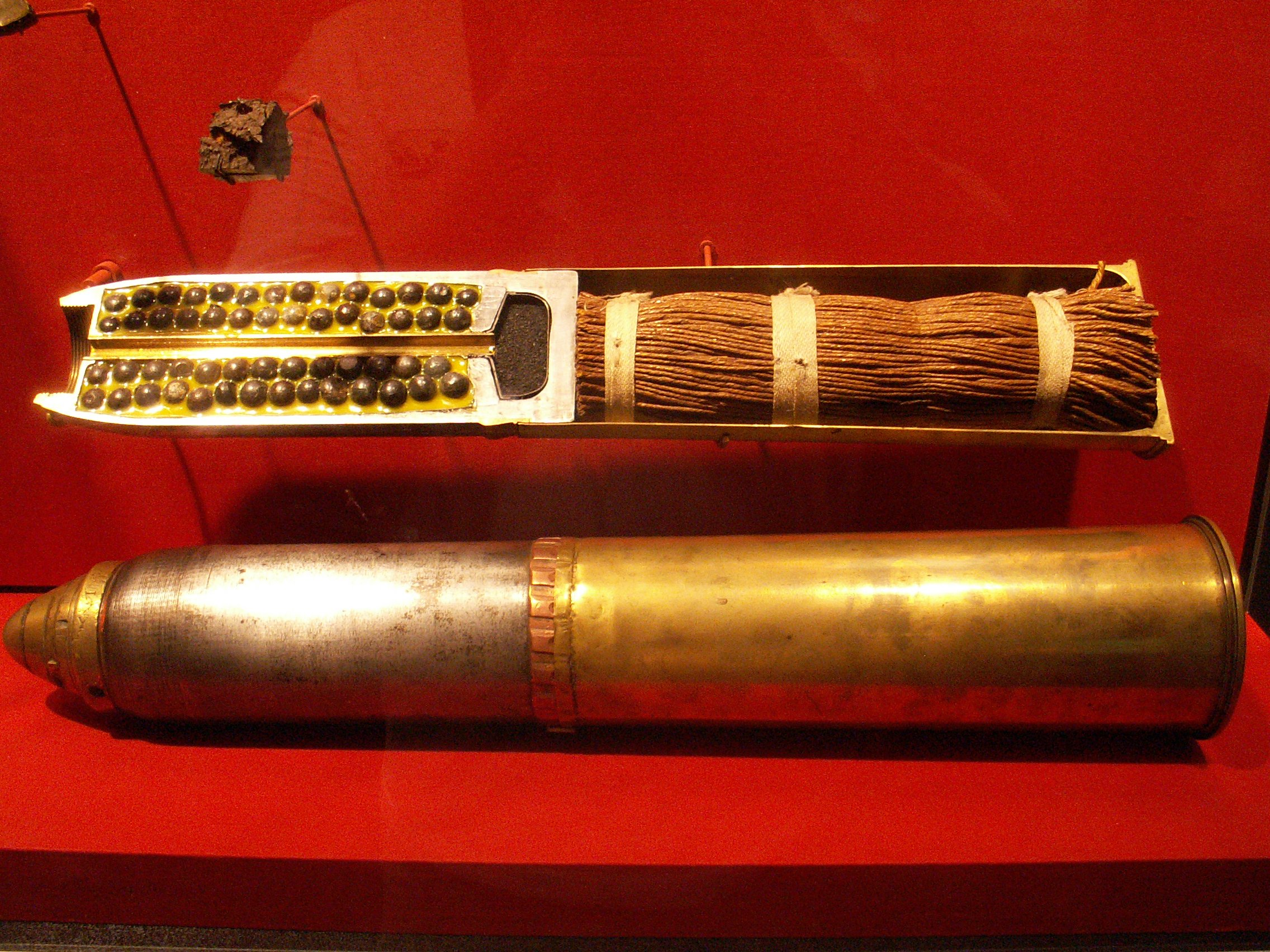
A sectioned British 18-pounder field gun shrapnel round, World War I, with bound string to simulate the appearance of the original cordite propellant

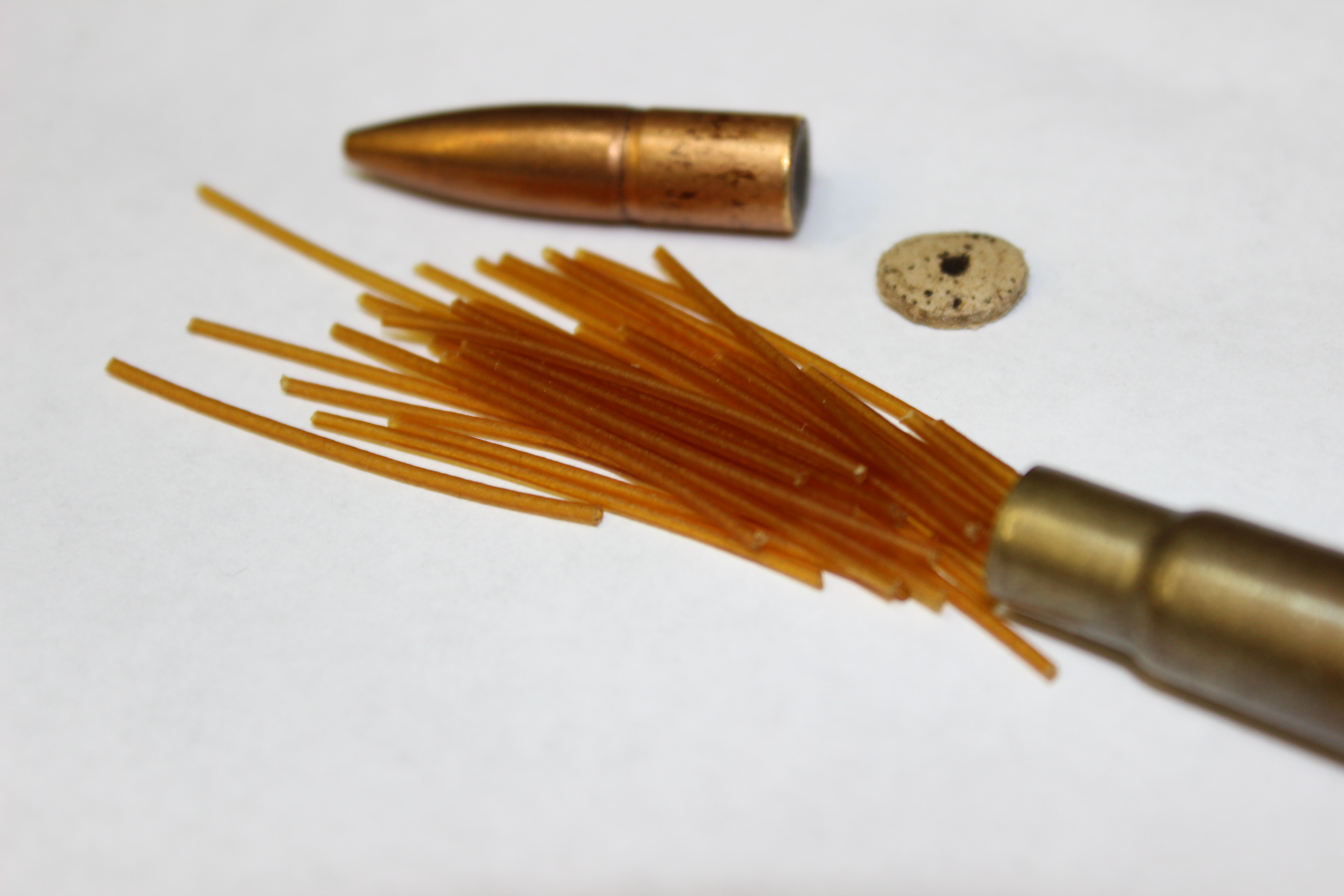
Close-up of cordite filaments in a .303 British rifle cartridge (manufactured in 1964)

Burning a strand of cordite from a .303 British round

Cordite is a family of smokeless propellants developed and produced in Britain since 1889 to replace black powder as a military firearm propellant. Cordite is made by combining two chemical explosives—nitrocellulose and nitroglycerine—with petroleum jelly. (Note: See later) It is designed, in normal use, to produce a subsonic deflagration wave rather than the supersonic detonation wave produced by brisants, or high explosives. The hot gases produced by burning gunpowder or cordite generate sufficient pressure to propel a bullet or shell to its target, but not so quickly as to damage the gun barrel.

Cordite was used initially in the .303 British, Mark I and II, standard rifle cartridge between 1891 and 1915. Shortages of cordite in World War I led to the creation of the HM Factory, Gretna on the English–Scottish border, which produced around 800 tons of cordite per week. The UK also imported some United States–developed smokeless powders for use in rifle cartridges. Cordite was also used for large weapons, such as tank guns, artillery, and naval guns. It has been used mainly for this purpose since the late 19th century by the UK and British Commonwealth countries. Its use was further developed before World War II, and as 2-and-3-inch-diameter (51 and 76 mm) Unrotated Projectiles for launching anti-aircraft weapons. Small cordite rocket charges were also developed for ejector seats made by the Martin-Baker Company. Cordite was also used in the detonation system of the Little Boy atomic bomb dropped over Hiroshima in August 1945.

During World War II, double-base propellants were very widely used, and there was some use of triple-base propellants by artillery. Triple-base propellants were used in post-war ammunition designs and remain in production for UK weapons; most double-base propellants left service as World War II stocks were expended after the war. For small arms it has been replaced by other propellants, such as the Improved Military Rifle (IMR) line of extruded powder or the WC844 ball propellant currently in use in the 5.56×45mm NATO. Production ceased in the United Kingdom around the end of the 20th century, with the closure of the last of the World War II cordite factories, ROF Bishopton. Triple-base propellant for UK service (for example, the 105 mm L118 Light Gun) is now manufactured in Germany.

== Adoption of smokeless powders by the British government ==
=== Gunpowder (black powder) ===
Gunpowder, a combustable mixture of sulfur, charcoal and potassium nitrate (also known as saltpetre), was the original propellant employed in firearms and fireworks. It was used from about the 10th or 11th century onward, but it had disadvantages, including the large amount of smoke it produced. With the 19th-century development of various "nitro explosives", based on the reaction of nitric acid mixtures on materials such as cellulose and glycerin, a search began for a replacement for gunpowder.

=== Early European smokeless powders ===
The first smokeless powder was developed in 1865 by Johann Edward Schultze. At the time of this breakthrough, Schultze was a captain of Prussian artillery. Schultze eventually rose to the rank of colonel. His formulation (dubbed Schultze Powder) was composed of nitrolignose derived from nitrated wood grains, impregnated with saltpetre or barium nitrate.

In 1882, the Explosive Company of Stowmarket introduced EC Powder, which contained nitro-cotton and nitrates of potassium and barium in a grain gelatinised by ether alcohol. It had coarser grains than other nitrocellulose powders. It proved unsuitable for rifles, but it remained in long use for shotguns; and was later used for grenades and fragmentation bombs.

In 1884, the French chemist Paul Vieille produced a smokeless propellant that had some success. It was made out of collodion (nitrocellulose dissolved in ethanol and ether), resulting in a plastic colloidal substance which was rolled into very thin sheets, then dried and cut up into small flakes. It was immediately adopted by the French military for their Mle 1886 infantry rifle and called Poudre B (for poudre blanche, or white powder) to distinguish it from black powder (gunpowder). The rifle and the cartridge developed to use this powder were known generically as the 8mm Lebel, after the officer who developed its 8 mm full metal jacket bullet.

Based on his earlier success in developing blasting gelatin, Alfred Nobel began work in 1887/8 on trying to find an nitrated material that could be safely used as propellant to replace black powder (gunpowder) and he later patented a smokeless propellant he called Ballistite. It was composed of 10% camphor, 45% nitroglycerine and 45% collodion (nitrocellulose). Over time the camphor tended to evaporate, leaving an unstable explosive.

Nobel was also to purchase of rights of a Swedish patent obtained in May 1867, by two Swedes: Ohlsson and Norbinn, for an explosive consisting of ammonium nitrate, sawdust, powdered charcoal and a nitrated substance - picric acid and nitroglycerine were specifically given as examples in Ohlsson and Norbinn's patent. Nobel's two Ballistite patent claims refer to the use of Celluloid, camphor, and soluble nitrocellulose, along with the method of converting this into finished propellant. At the end of the court case, the judge concluded that Nobel was specifically distinguishing between the use of soluble and insoluble nitrocellulose; and gave detailed reasons for his decision.

== Development of Cordites ==
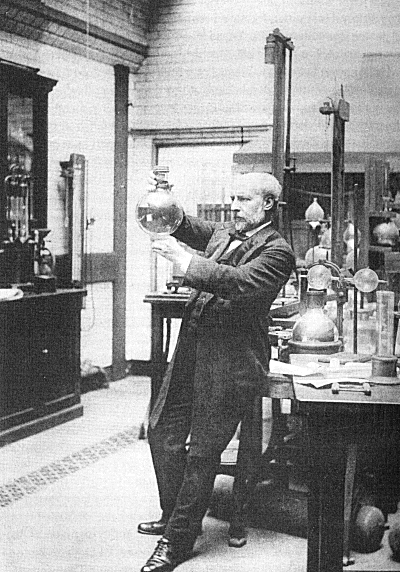
Sir James Dewar at work

A United Kingdom government committee, known as the "Explosives Committee", chaired by Sir Frederick Abel, monitored foreign developments in explosives and obtained samples of Poudre B and Ballistite; neither of these smokeless powders was recommended for adoption by the Explosives Committee.

Abel, Sir James Dewar and W Kellner, who was also on the committee, developed and jointly patented (Nos 5,614 and 11,664 in the names of Abel and Dewar) in 1889 a new ballistite-like propellant in 1889. It consists of (by weight) 58% nitroglycerin, 37% guncotton (nitrocellulose) and 5% petroleum jelly. Using acetone as a solvent, it was extruded as spaghetti-like rods initially called "cord powder" or "the Committee's modification of Ballistite", but this was swiftly abbreviated to "Cordite".

Cordite began as a double-base propellant. (Note: It contains two explosives: nitroglycerine and nitrocellulose.) In the 1930s, triple-base propellant was developed by including a substantial proportion of nitroguanidine. (Note: It contains two high explosives: nitroglycerine and nitroguanidine (added as a muzzle flash reducer), as well as the explosive nitrocellulose.) Triple-base propellant reduced the disadvantages of the double-base propellant – its relatively high temperature of combustion and significant muzzle flash.

Imperial Chemical Industries's (ICI) World War II double-base propellant AN formulation also had a much lower temperature than Cordite Mk 1, but it lacked the flash reduction properties of N and NQ triple-base propellants.

=== Nobel and Abel patent dispute ===
Schuck and Solhman in their 1926 [1929] biography of Alfred Nobel specifically state that he made Paris his headquarters in 1873; and he set up an experimental laboratory there, with a young chemist as an assistant. Nobel had developed and patented a diatomaceous earth-based Dynamite in 1875: English Patent No. 4175: ″Improved explosive (blasting gelatine or gelatine dynamite)″; and in this 1875 patent claim he specifically gives an example of using guncotton as a substance that may be used for this purpose. Dynamite had certain disadvantages: it had produced less explosive power than nitroglycerine alone, as the diatomaceous earth had a cooling effect; and as the nitroglycerine soaked into the diatomaceous earth, the dynamite ″aged″ and further reduced the explosive power compared with freshly prepared dynamite. Nobel appears to have been looking for an energetic replacement for the diatomaceous earth. Nobel was to later supply Ballistite as a military propellant to another county and in 1890 France accused him of spying on their nearby military laboratory, so he had to close his laboratory and move it to Sanremo.

Noble's Explosives Company, of Glasgow, who held Alfred Nobel's English patent for Ballistite, regarded Abel's and Dewer's cordite patent to be an infringement of their patent; and they protested, but this could not be resolved. Overall between 1893 and 1895, this disagreement went first to the British courts, as a so-called 'friendly suit′. After losing the case, it went to the Court of Appeal and eventually reached the House of Lords, in 1895.

The law suit against Abel and Dewar was an alleged patent infringement of Nobel's English 1888 patent: No. 1470, 31 January 1888: ″Improvements in the manufacture of explosives″. The patent claim stated: the production of a gelatinous mixture of nitrocellulose and nitroglycerine; the nitrocellulose should be "of the well-known soluble kind"; the ratios should be between 1 to 2 and 2 to 1; a suitable solvent could be used, and then removed; the mixture was blended by rolling it through warm rollers; a thin sheet was to be produced and this was to be cut with a knife or scissors to the required shape. On 13 March 1889 Nobel took out another English Patent No. 4449: ″Improved Manufacture of Explosives″ (Supplementary Patent to No. 1470,1888): which specified the addition of Acetic ether of Glycerine, or other non-volatile solvents used in the manufacture, but the scope was limited to explosives used for blasting in mines.

The legal suit was finally lost and a detailed judgement was given. (Note: See which devotes nine pages to the Judgement of this case.) It was because the patent claim used the words "of the well-known soluble kind"; and the meaning of this had to be tested in Law. It was taken to refer to the use of soluble collodion; and hence it specifically excluded the insoluble guncotton, which had a higher degree of nitration than the soluble kind. The phrase "soluble nitro-cellulose" was known as Collodion and was soluble in a mixture of alcohol and ether. It was employed mainly for medical and photographic use. In contrast, the insoluble nitrocellulose in an alcohol ether mixture was known as gun cotton and was used as an explosive.

At the time of the case, there were two types of nitrocellulose, one known as soluble nitrocellulose and one as insoluble cellulose. Nobel's patent claim specifically refers to the production of a explosive using Celluloid, camphor and soluble nitrocellulose; and this was taken to imply that Nobel was specifically distinguishing between the use of soluble and insoluble nitrocellulose.

Alfred Nobel was a prolific generator of English patents: according to Schuck and Solhman, his 1888 Ballistite patent would have been his forty eighth successful English Patent. Schuck and Solhman also state that Nobel's discovery of how to make Ballistite has been wrongly described in the literature as just a lucky discovery: he had accidentally mixed nitroglycerine with a collodion solution and obtained a geletanous mass. Nobel discounts this story: he had already considered using a mixture of guncotton and nitrocellulose, and had mentioned this combination as a claim in his English 1875 Dynamite patent; but he found the absorption capacity of ordinary nitrocellulose was inadequate and he failed to make a solution out of guncotton and nitroglycerine. He woke up very early from the pain of a cut finger which he had covered with collodion and this encouraged him to try that. At four o'clock in the morning he had successfully made a solution of, the lower-nitrated, collodion in nitroglycerine and showed it to his assistant.

Yoel Bergman has argued that Abel and Dewar's Cordite development was driven by the inadequacy of Ballistite—which had been improved only because of British testing—and the need for an indigenous UK smokeless propellant. He concluded "Nobel's claim of patent infringement [was] at best questionable".

However, in her 2019 biography of Alfred Nobel Ingrid Carlberg notes how closely Abel and Dewar were allowed to follow Nobel's work in Paris, and how disappointed Nobel was with how this trust was betrayed. Carlberg argues for Nobel as the original inventor and that the case was lost because of an unimportant technicality.

While cordite is classified as a military explosive, which commonly introduces legal controls on its production, storage and transportation, it is not employed as a high explosive. It was specifically designed as a propellant to deflagrate, to produce high pressure gases.

== Formulations ==
It was quickly discovered that the rate of burning could be varied by altering the surface area of the cordite. Narrow rods were used in small-arms and were relatively fast burning, while thicker rods would burn more slowly and were used for longer barrels, such as those used in artillery and naval guns.

=== Cordite (Mk I) and Cordite MD ===
The original Abel-Dewar formulation, of 58% nitroglycerin, 37% guncotton (nitrocellulose) and 5% petroleum jelly, was soon superseded, as it caused excessive gun barrel erosion. To avoid confusion with newer formulations it was renamed as: Cordite Mk I.

Shortly after the end of the Second Boer War, the composition of cordite was changed to 65% guncotton, 30% nitroglycerin (keeping 5% petroleum jelly), with acetone as a solvent. This was known as Cordite MD (modified) and it produced a cooler burning propellant. Cordite MD cartridges typically weighed approximately 15% more than the equivalent Cordite Mk I cartridges they replaced, as to achieve the same muzzle velocity more propellant needed to be loaded into the guns, due to the inherently less powerful nature of Cordite MD. (Note: Example: BL 6-inch Mk VII gun : 20 lb; cordite Mk I, 23 lb cordite MD. Table 8 in Treatise on Ammunition 1915.)

=== Cordite RDB ===
During World War I, acetone was in short supply in Great Britain, and a new experimental form of cordite was developed in the Research Department, at the Royal Arsenal, specifically at the request of the Admiralty. To arm the large naval guns fitted to the Royal Navy's warships, the navy needed access to the more stable Cordite MD; and in January 1915 the Admiralty pressed the War Office to accept alternatives to Cordite MD propellant, so as direct more Cordite MD to the Royal Navy.

This was accepted as a War Emergency Measure in May 1915. For large guns, this was to be Cordite RDB (= Research Department formula B); which was 52% collodion, 42% nitroglycerin and 6% petroleum jelly. By using collodion instead of guncotton, the alcohol and ether which was available in Great Britain could be used to gelatinate the propellant into a paste ready for extrusion into rods or tubes.

Cordite RDB was produced both at HM Factory, Gretna, which was the largest cordite factory in Great Britain; and the Royal Navy Cordite Factory, Holton Heath.

Acetone for the cordite industry during late World War I was eventually produced through the efforts of Dr. Chaim Weizmann, considered to be the father of industrial fermentation. While a lecturer at Manchester University Weizmann discovered how to use bacterial fermentation to produce large quantities of many desired substances. He used the bacterium Clostridium acetobutylicum (the so-called Weizmann organism) to produce acetone. Weizmann transferred the rights to the manufacture of acetone to the Commercial Solvents Corporation in exchange for royalties. After the Shell Crisis of 1915 during World War I, he was director of the British Admiralty Laboratories from 1916 until 1919.

=== Cordite SC ===
Research on solvent-free Cordite RDB, technologically extremely similar to ballistite, continued primarily on the addition of stabilizers, which was based on German RP C/12 propellant featuring significant amounts of centralite (Called "carbamite" in British parlance) and led to the type commonly used in World War II as the main naval propellant. In Great Britain this was known as Cordite SC (= Solventless Cordite), and it required production facilities separate from classical cordite.

Cordite SC was produced in different shapes and sizes, so the particular geometry of Cordite SC was indicated by the use of letters or numbers, or both, after the SC. For example, SC followed by a number was rod-shaped cord, with the number representing the diameter in thousandths of an inch. "SC T" followed by two sets of numbers indicated tubular propellant, with the numbers representing the two diameters in thousandths.

Two-inch (approximately 50.8 mm) and three-inch (approximately 76.2 mm) diameter, rocket Cordite SC charges were developed in great secrecy before World War II for anti-aircraft purposes—the so-called Z batteries, using 'Unrotated Projectiles'.

Great Britain changed to metric units in the 1960s, so there was a discontinuity in the propellant geometry numbering system.

=== Cordite N ===
An important development during World War II was the addition of another explosive, nitroguanidine, to the mixture to form triple-base propellant or Cordite N and NQ. The formulations were slightly different for artillery and naval use. This solved two problems associated with the large naval guns fitted to British Navy's capital ships: gun flash and muzzle erosion. Nitroguanidine produces large amounts of nitrogen when heated, which had the benefit of reducing the muzzle flash, and its lower burning temperature greatly reduced the erosion of the gun barrel.

N and NQ were also issued in limited amounts to ammunitions used by the British 25-pdr and 5.5-inch land-based artillery pieces.

After World War II large scale production of double-base propellants generally ended. Triple-base propellants, N and NQ, were the only ones used in new ammunition designs, such as the cartridges for 105 mm Field and for 155 mm FH70.

== Manufacture ==
=== UK Government factories ===
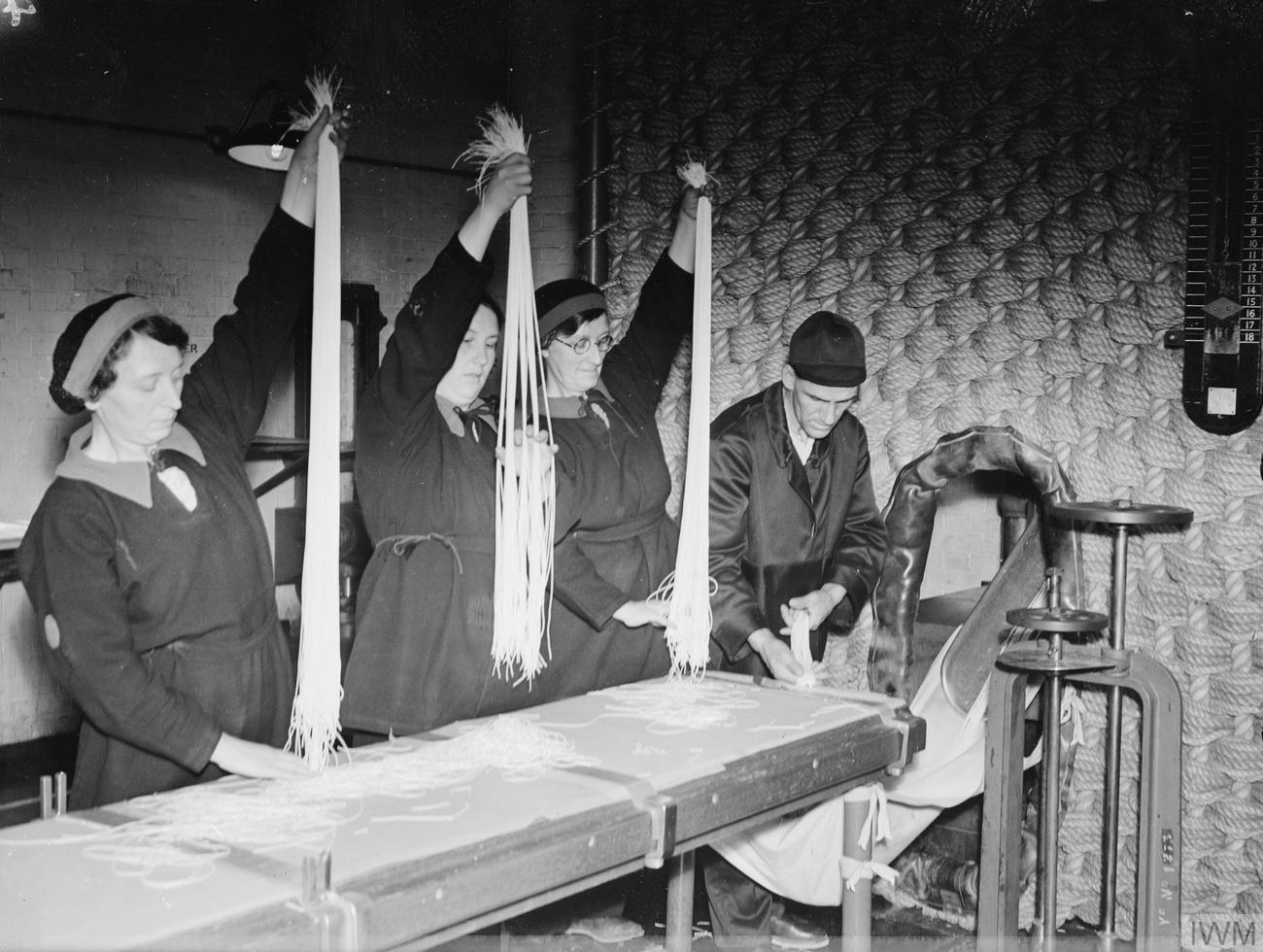
Cordite production during World War II at a Royal Naval armaments factory at Holton Heath. The long strings of cordite are being combed to eliminate short lengths.

In Great Britain, cordite was developed for military use at the Royal Arsenal by Abel, Dewar and Kellner, Woolwich, and produced at the Waltham Abbey Royal Gunpowder Mills from 1889 onwards.

At the start of World War I, cordite was in production at Waltham Abbey Royal Gunpowder Mills and by seven other suppliers (British Explosives Syndicate Ltd, Chilworth Gunpowder Company Ltd, Cotton Powder Company Ltd, Messrs Curtis's and Harvey Ltd, National Explosives Company Ltd, New Explosives Company Ltd and Nobels Explosive Company Ltd). Existing factories were expanded and new ones built, notably by Nobel's at Ardeer, the HM Factory, Gretna, which straddled the Scotland-England border at Gretna, and the Royal Navy Cordite Factory, Holton Heath. A factory was also established by the Indian Government at Nilgris. Both the Gretna and the Holton Heath cordite factories closed at the end of World War I.

By the start of World War II, Holton Heath had reopened, and an additional factory for the Royal Navy, The Royal Navy Propellant Factory, Caerwent, opened at Caerwent in Wales. A very large Royal Ordnance Factory, ROF Bishopton, was opened in Scotland to manufacture cordite for the British Army and the Royal Air Force. A new cordite factory at Waltham Abbey and two additional ROF's—ROF Ranskill and ROF Wrexham—were also opened. Cordite produced in these factories was sent to filling factories for filling into ammunition.

=== MoS Agency Factories and ICI Nobel in World War II ===
The British Government set up additional cordite factories, not under Royal Ordnance Factory control but as Agency Factories run on behalf of the Ministry of Supply (MoS). The company of ICI Nobel, at Ardeer, was asked in 1939 to construct and operate six factories in southern Scotland. Four of these six were involved in cordite or firearm-propellant manufacture. The works at MoS Drungans (Dumfries) produced guncotton that was converted to cordite at MoS Dalbeattie (triple-base cordite) and at MoS Powfoot (monobase granulated guncotton for small-arms). A smaller site at Girvan, South Ayrshire, now occupied by Grant's distillery, produced cordite and TNT. The ICI Ardeer site also had a mothballed World War I Government-owned cordite factory.

35% of British cordite produced between 1942 and 1945 came from Ardeer and these agency factories. ICI ran a similar works at Deer Park (which was also confusingly known as Ardeer after the adjacent suburb) near Melbourne in Australia and in South Africa.

=== Overseas supplies ===
Additional sources of propellant were also sought from the British Commonwealth in both World War I and World War II. Canada, South Africa, and Australia had ICI-owned factories that, in particular, supplied large quantities of cordite.

==== World War I ====
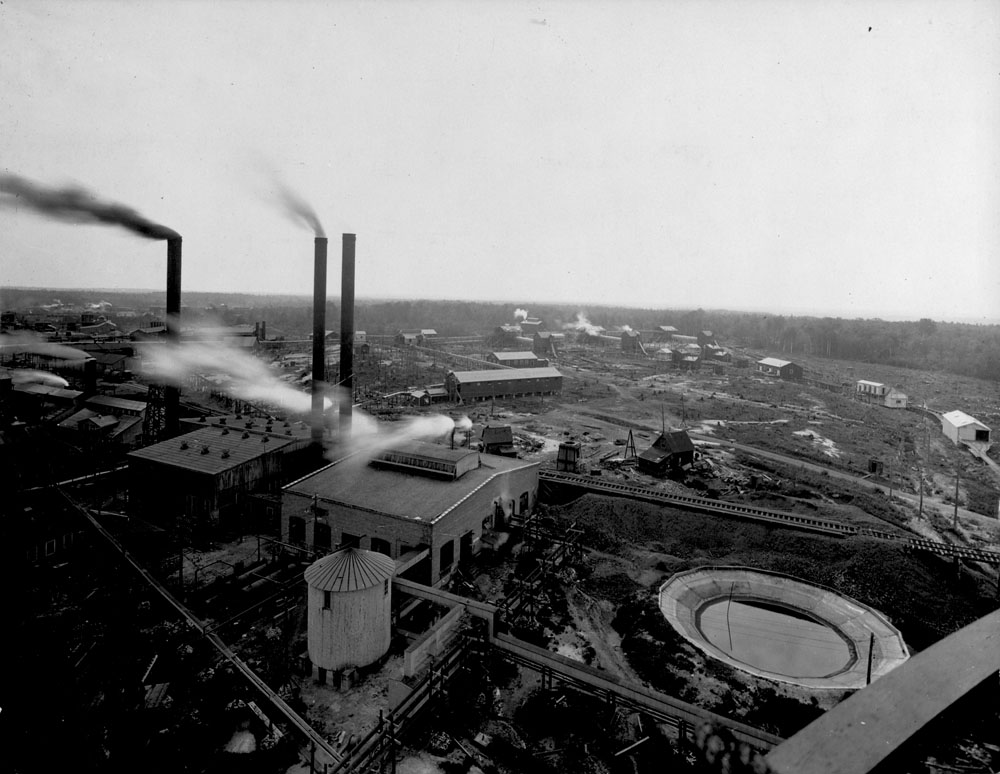
Bird's-eye view of a portion of Canadian Explosives Ltd., Nobel, Ontario

Canadian Explosives Limited was formed in 1910 to produce rifle cordite, at its Beloeil factory, for the Quebec Arsenal. By November 1915 production had been expanded to produce 350,000 lb (159,000 kg) of cordite per month for the Imperial Munitions Board.

The Imperial Munitions Board set up a number of additional explosives factories in Canada. It built The British Cordite Ltd factory at Nobel, Ontario, in 1916/1917, to produce cordite. Production started in mid-1917.

Canadian Explosives Limited built an additional cordite factory at Nobel, Ontario. Work started in February 1918 and was finished on 24 August 1918. It was designed to produce 1,500,000 lb (681,000 kg) of cordite per month.

Factories, specifically "heavy industry" (Long, and Marland 2009) were important for the provision of munitions. Cordite factories typically employed women (Cook 2006) who put their lives at risk as they packed the shells.

== Production quantities ==
Large quantities of cordite were manufactured in both World Wars for use by the military.

=== Pre-World War I ===
Prior to World War I, most of the cordite used by the British Government was produced in its own factories. Immediately prior to World War I, between 6,000 and 8,000 tons per year of cordite were produced in the United Kingdom by private manufacturers; between 1,000 and 1,500 tons per year were made by Nobel's Explosives, at Ardeer. However, private industry had the capability to produce about 10,000 tons per year, with Ardeer able to produce some 3,000 tons of this total.

=== World War I ===
At the start of World War I, private industry in the UK was asked to produce 16,000 tons of cordite, and all the companies started to expand. HM Factory, Gretna, the largest propellant factory in the United Kingdom, which opened in 1916, was by 1917 producing 800 tons (812 tonne) of Cordite RDB per week (approximately 41,600 tons per year). The Royal Navy had its own factory at Holton Heath.

In 1910, Canadian Explosives Limited produced 3,000 lb (1,362 kg) of rifle cordite per month at its Beloeil factory, for the Quebec Arsenal. By November 1915 production had been expanded to 350,000 lb (159,000 kg) of cordite per month (approximately 1,900 tonnes per year). The Canadian Explosives Limited cordite factory at Nobel, Ontario, was designed to produce 1,500,000 lb (681 tonne) of cordite per month (approximately 8,170 tonnes per year).

=== Between wars ===
HM Factory, Gretna, and the Royal Navy Cordite Factory, Holton Heath, both closed after the end of the war and the Gretna factory was dismantled. This left the Waltham Abbey and Ardeer factories in production.

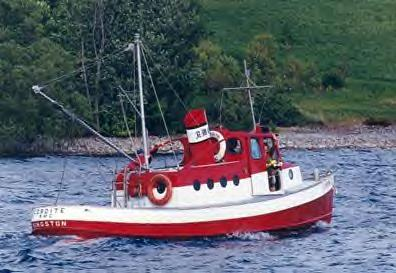
MV Cordite, Royal Military College of Canada

=== World War II ===
As noted above, in addition to its own facilities, the British Government had ICI Nobel set up a number of Agency Factories producing cordite in Scotland, Australia, Canada and South Africa.

== See also ==
- Shimose powder

== Bibliography ==
- Bowditch, M.R.; Hayward, L. (1996). A Pictorial Record of the Royal Naval Cordite Factory: Holton Heath. Wareham: Finial Publishing. ISBN 1-900467-01-1.
- Brown, David K.; McCallum, Iain (2001). "Ammunition Explosions in World War I". Warship International. XXXVIII (1). International Naval Research Organization: 58–69. ISSN 0043-0374.
- Brown, Donald (1999). Somerset v Hitler: Secret Operations in the Mendips 1939 – 1945. Newbury: Countryside Books. ISBN 1-85306-590-0.
- Carnegie, David (1925). The History of Munitions Supply in Canada 1914-1918. London: Longmans, Green and Co.
- Cocroft, Wayne D. (2000). Dangerous Energy: The archaeology of gunpowder and military explosives manufacture. Swindon: English Heritage. ISBN 1-85074-718-0.
- Cocroft, Wayne D. (2006). "Chapter 3, First World War Explosives Manufacture: the British Experience". In MacLeod, Roy; Johnson, Jeffrey Allan (eds.). Frontline and Factory: Comparative Perspectives on the Chemical Industry at War, 1914-1924. Archimedes: New Studies in the history and philosopy of Science and Technology. Vol. 19. Dordrectch, The Netherlands: Springer. ISBN 978-1-4020-5489-1.
- Davis, Tenney L. (1943). The Chemistry of Powder and Explosives. Vol. II. New York: John Wiley & Sons.
- Hartcup, Guy (1970). The Challenge of War: Scientific and Engineering Contributions to World War Two. Newton Abbot: David & Charles. ISBN 0-7153-4789-6.
- Hogg, O.F.G. (1970). Artillery: its origin, heyday and decline. London: C Hurst and Company.
- Ministry of Munitions of War (1919). H.M. Factory, Gretna: Description of plant and process. Dumfries: J. Maxwell and Son, for His Majesty's Stationery Office.
- Ministry of Munitions (n.d.) [1922]. The Official History of the Ministry of Munitions, Volume X: The Supply of Munitions, Part IV: Gun Ammunition: Explosives, Chapter I: Devopments in the Use and Manufacture of Explosives. Uckfield, East Sussex: The Naval & Military Press. ISBN 978-1-84734-884-5.
- Reader, W.J. (1975). Imperial Chemical Industries: A History. Volume II; The First Quarter-Century 1926-1952. London: Oxford University Press. ISBN 0-19-215944-5.
- Schuck, H.; Sohlman, R. (1929) [1926]. Alfred Nobel och hans släkt. Minnesskrift utgiven av Nobelstiftelsens styrelse [The Life of Alfred Nobel]. Translated by Lunn, Brian and Beatrice. London: William Heinemann.
- Rotter, Andrew J. (2008). Hiroshima: The World's Bomb. Oxford: Oxford University Press. ISBN 978-0-19-280437-2.
- Zukas, John A.; Walters, William P. (2002). Explosives, Effects and Applications. Springer.
- History of the Ministry of Munitions. Vol. X:The Supply of Munitions. Uckfield, East Sussex: The Naval & Military Press. n.d. [1922]. ISBN 978-1-84734-884-5.
