= ROF Maltby =

British munitions factory

Coordinates: 53.424°N 1.168°W

ROF Maltby was a Royal Ordnance Factory rifle manufacturing plant near Maltby, South Yorkshire which manufactured weapons such as the Lee–Enfield rifle and Sten submachine gun. During World War II, ROF Maltby manufactured over 737,000 weapons. Rifles manufactured at Maltby were marked either with and M, RM or ROF(M) to distinguish them from rifles made at other ROF plants.

ROF Maltby and ROF Fazakerley were established in the 1930s before World War II to increase arms production facilities in areas less vulnerable to aerial attack, and were called shadow factories after an earlier national plan to increase military airplane production. The main British factory for rifle manufacture in WWII was the BSA shadow factory in Shirley. R.S.A.F. Enfield, which until 1941 was Britain's main military rifle production facility, focused on producing Bren Guns etc.

ROF Maltby's closure was announced in Parliament in July 1957 with dismantling work beginning almost immediately afterwards and complete withdrawal and demolition had been achieved by 1958.
