= ROF Fazakerley =

Former rifle manufacturing plant in Liverpool, England

Coordinates: 53.466°N 2.925°W

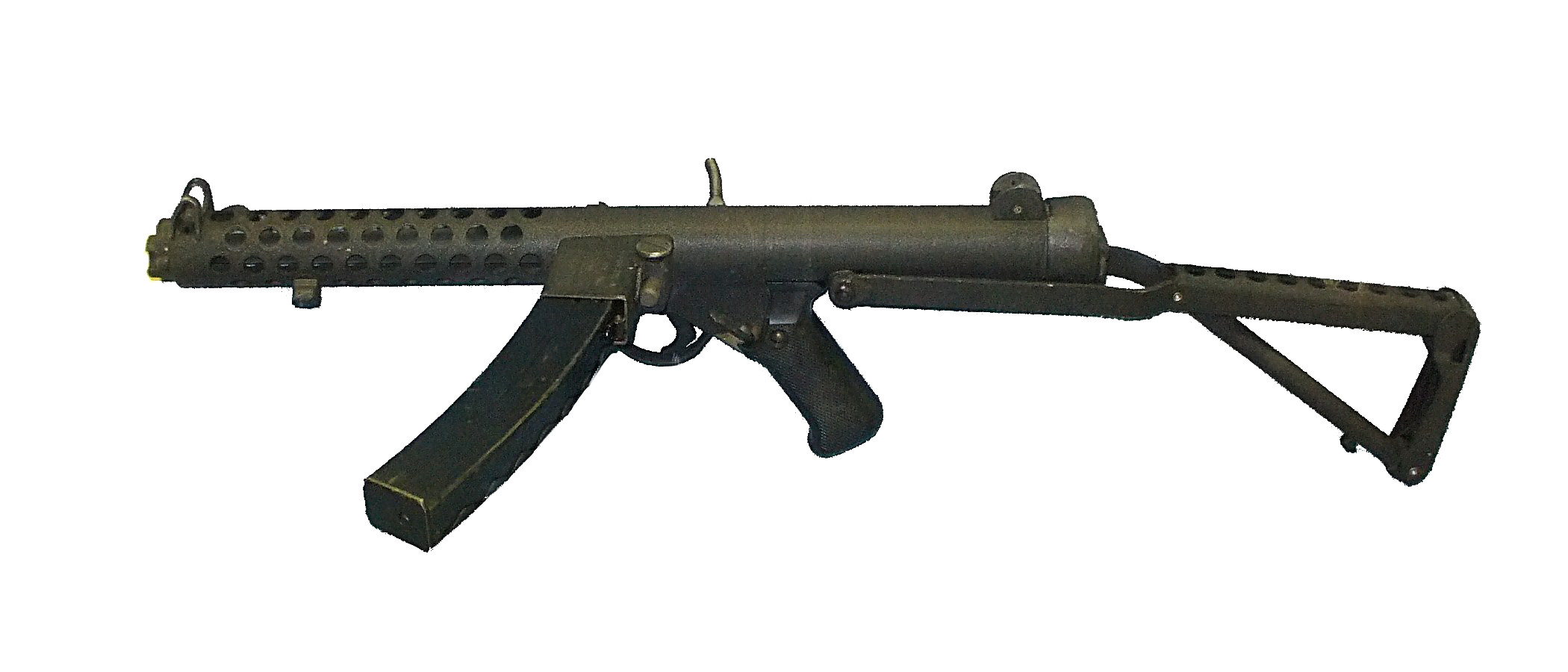
A Sterling L2A3 (Mark 4) submachine gun. ROF Fazakerley manufactured 164,000 Sterlings between 1956 and 1960, after which production of the weapon ended permanently

ROF Fazakerley was a Royal Ordnance Factory rifle manufacturing plant in Fazakerley, Liverpool, which manufactured small arms such as the Sten and Sterling submachine guns and Lee–Enfield rifle during and after World War II.

ROF Fazakerley and ROF Maltby were established before World War II to increase arms production facilities in areas less vulnerable to aerial attack. The main Royal Small Arms Factory for rifle manufacture was in Enfield, London.
