= ROF Swynnerton =

Coordinates: 52.893°N 2.218°W

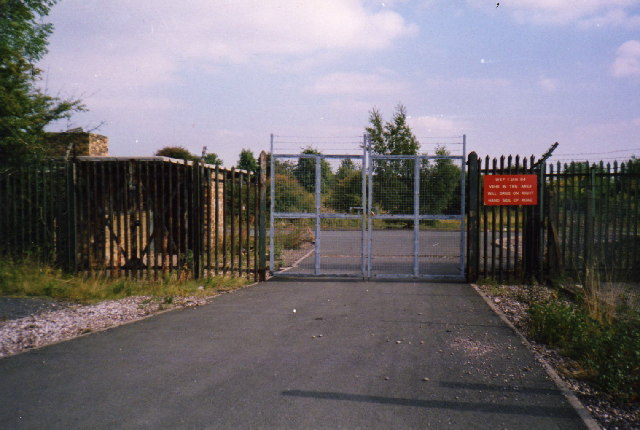
Gates to Swynnerton Training Camp

ROF Swynnerton was a Royal Ordnance Factory, more specifically a filling factory, located south of the village of Swynnerton in Staffordshire, United Kingdom. Built between 1939 and 1941, it remained operational until 1958. It was later operated by the Defence Training Estate, as Swynnerton Training Camp.

Swynnerton Training Area is one of several UK locations now being used for the Afghan Relocations and Assistance Policy (ARAP) scheme, housing "Afghans who supported the UK mission in Afghanistan."

== Construction ==
Around 1,200 acres (490 ha) were requisitioned, principally from the Swynnerton and Cotes estates. Sir Alexander Gibb & Partners, Consultant Engineers to the Ministry of Supply, were appointed to supervise construction. Plans were drawn up by A.P.I.Cotterell & Son, Chartered Engineers, on behalf of Gibb. The Royal Arsenal, Woolwich, as the long-established principal Royal Ordnance Factory, designed the various processes and layout of buildings. The Engineer-in-Chief, appointed to oversee the construction was Wilfrid Cracroft Ash. Site work was divided into areas under divisional superintendents who were directly responsible to Ash.

ROF Swynnerton, being a 'filling' factory was the most dangerous of the various types of munitions factories; bomb and shell-casings were filled with highly combustible explosive materials. It was planned that the factory should provide at least some production while construction continued. Swynnerton became operational in stages, from the middle of 1940. The factory was completed in two years, a task which, in peace-time, would have taken five years. It consisted of over 1,700 small buildings, each surrounded by earth banks to contain accidental blasts; if one building was destroyed the adjacent buildings would be unaffected. Five large boiler-houses were built strategically around the perimeter of the site so that, if one or two were bombed, production could still be maintained. Roadways between buildings were of smooth, grit-free asphalt and were called ‘cleanways’ because they had to be kept clean at all times, to avoid any possibility of sparks.

In addition to the factory itself, seven residential hostels were built, along with houses and flats, for munitions workers and almost 500 families of specialist staff.

== Railway connections ==
By mid 1942, ROF Swynnerton had become fully operational and the number of people working at the site had grown to approximately 18,500. To meet the need of getting the factory workers to and from the factory the Ministry of Supply asked the London, Midland and Scottish Railway (LMS) to construct a station. The site already had an extensive rail network served from the West Coast Main Line between Crewe and Stafford but the LMS chose to build a new branch line running to the site from the North Staffordshire Railway line between Stone and Norton Bridge. The branch line, which was double track throughout, ran for just under 2 miles (3.2 km) from Swynnerton Junction to Cold Meece railway station.

The station was for passenger traffic only and no goods facilities were ever provided, all freight movements for the factory were dealt with via the link to the Crewe branch of the West Coast Main Line at Badnall Wharf.

After the war ended the factory and station both continued in use until 1958. The factory closed in May 1958 and although the last scheduled train ran in June 1958, the station did not officially close until August 1959. The branch had been lifted by September 1963.

During the war the factory worked 24 hours a day and the passenger service to Cold Meece reflected this with nineteen trains a day, Monday to Saturday, serving the station in time for the shift changes at 5:35 am, 1:35 pm and 8:35 pm. Services ran to and from three main destinations; Newchapel and Goldenhill, Silverdale and Blythe Bridge picking up at all stations en route except those between Stoke-on-Trent and Stone. In addition there was one service each way classed as a recreational service for people who lived on the site to get into Stoke. Sunday services comprised two trains each way to Silverdale and Blythe Bridge and three each way to Newchapel and Goldenhill.

== Post-war use ==
After the war the site was converted for military training use and became known as Swynnerton Training Camp. In 2019, proposals were revealed for a 'Garden village' on a small part of the site, to complement the nearby HS2 development.

Since the Fall of Afghanistan in 2021, up to 200 Afghans are being housed at Swynnerton Training Area until permanent accommodation is found for them. Military personnel and their families who supported the British Armed Forces were promised resettlement after Afghanistan was taken over by the Taliban.

== Sources ==
- Bebbington, Graham (2018). ROF Swynnerton - Bullets, Bombs & Roses. Leek, Staffordshire: Churnet Valley Books. ISBN 978-0-99560-398-1.
- Butt, R. V. J. (October 1995). The Directory of Railway Stations: details every public and private passenger station, halt, platform and stopping place, past and present (1st ed.). Sparkford: Patrick Stephens Ltd. ISBN 978-1-85260-508-7. OCLC 60251199. OL 11956311M.
- Christiansen, Rex & Miller, Robert William (1971). The North Staffordshire Railway. Newton Abbot, Devon: David & Charles. ISBN 0 7153 5121 4.
- Jeuda, Basil (2010). The North Staffordshire Railway in LMS days. Vol. 1. Lydney, Gloucestershire: Lightmoor Press. ISBN 978 1899889 48 8.
- Simmons, Jack; Biddle, Gordon, eds. (1997). The Oxford Companion to British railway history. Oxford: Oxford University Press. ISBN 0 1921 1697 5.
