= Filling factories in the United Kingdom =

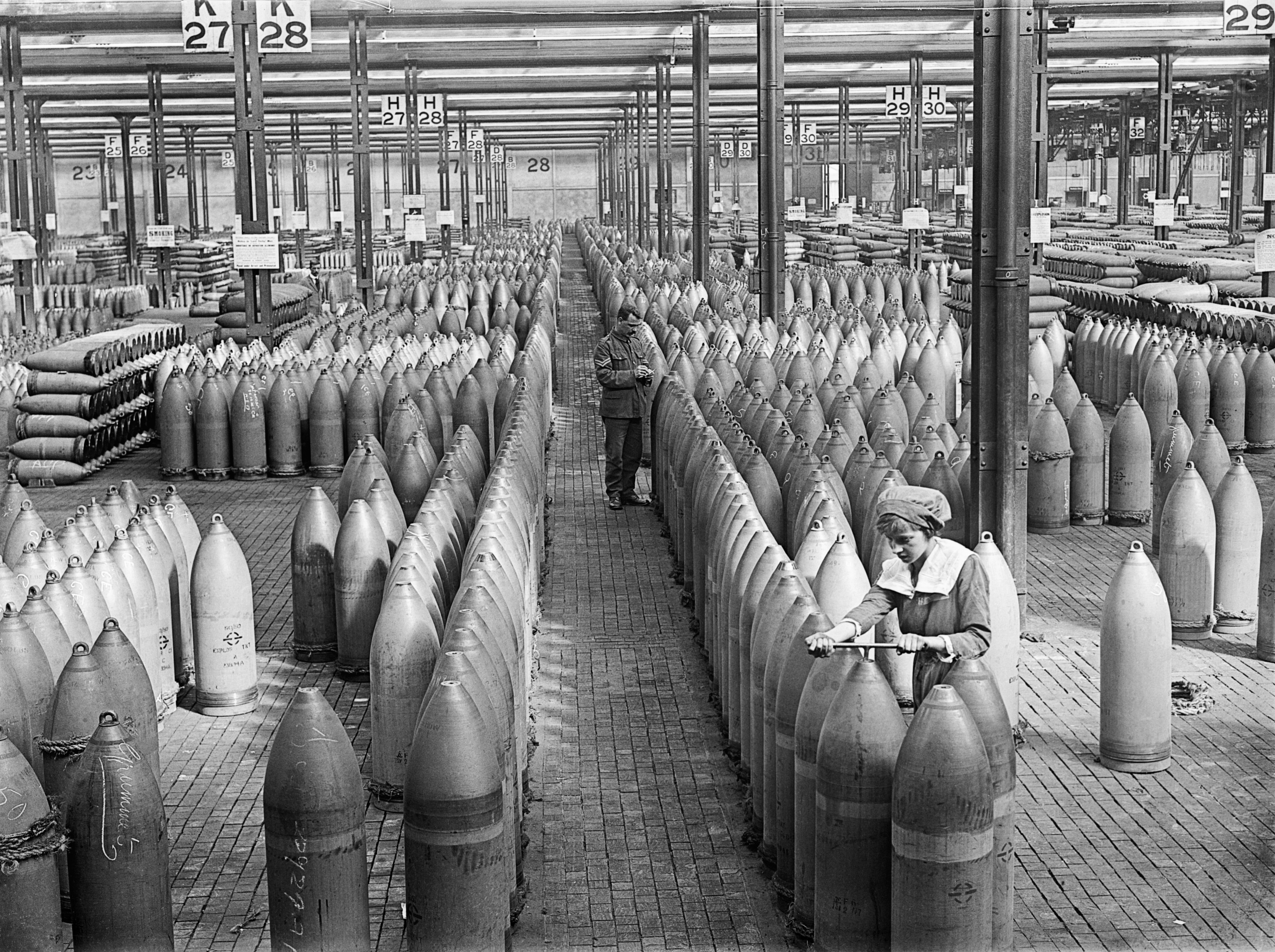
A warehouse containing 12-inch (30 cm) shells at the National Filling Factory, Chilwell. A soldier checks a shell and writes in a notebook, while a war worker tightens the top of a shell.

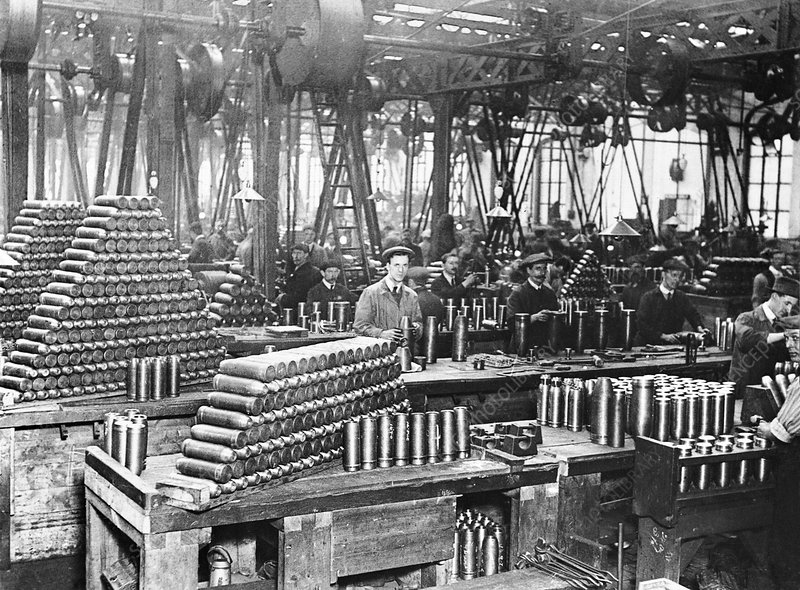
Scene in one of the great munition factories of England during 1916

A filling factory was a manufacturing plant that specialised in filling various munitions, such as bombs, shells, cartridges, pyrotechnics, and screening smokes. In the United Kingdom, during both world wars of the 20th century, the majority of the employees were women.

In World War I, a filling factory belonging to the Ministry of Munitions was known as a National Filling Factory.

In World War II, a filling factory belonging to the Ministry of Supply was known as a Royal Filling Factory (RFF), or a Royal Ordnance Factory (ROF). These were all part of the Royal Ordnance Factory organisation, owned by the MoS.

The filling of smoke screen canisters and other pyrotechnic devices was also carried out by fireworks manufacturers, particularly in World War II, but these are not specifically covered by this article.

== Raw materials ==
The filling factories' raw materials, such as TNT, RDX, or propellants, such as cordite, were manufactured in National Explosives Factories (World War I) or Explosive ROFs (World War II) and transported, by railway trains, to the filling factories for filling into munitions, produced at other plants.

High-explosives, such as TNT, had to be heated to melt them and the liquid was poured hot into heated shell cases. Care had to be taken to ensure that there were no voids in the poured explosive charge as this could lead to the shell detonating in the gun barrel during firing.

Shells and gun cartridges were manufactured in the UK, in World War II, by both the Engineering ROFs and private steel works / forging companies. It is believed that the empty brass cartridge cases for small arms were made at the Small Arms Ammunition Factories.

The filling factories produced their own pyrotechnics, such as fuses and screening smokes, as many of these were sensitive materials. They were then filled or assembled directly into the munitions.

They also would have sewn cotton bags for filling with primer composition or cordite charges.

== Filling groups ==
Filling factories had a large number of buildings. Buildings were needed on the various groups for filling of munitions. Explosives magazines were required by each group to store the incoming explosive materials and to store the outgoing filled shells or gun cartridges, usually packed in ammunition boxes. Storage buildings were also needed on each group to store the incoming empty shells and the empty ammunition boxes.

For safety purposes, munitions were segregated into different compatibility groups. A World War II filling factory would generally fill several different groups of munitions; and these groups would be located in different geographical areas within the danger area of the filling factory.

The World War II groups were:

- Group 1: Initiators, such as caps and detonators for primers and fuzes.
- Group 2: Fuze pellets, exploder pellets, exploder bags.
- Group 3: Filling of fuzes.
- Group 4: Blending of gunpowders for time fuzes.
- Group 5: Filling of cartridges, such as filling cordite into cloth bags or into brass cartridge cases.
- Group 6: Manufacture of smoke producing compositions.
- Group 7: Small arms filling.
- Group 8: Filling of shells or bombs.
- Group 9: Large magazines, filled ammunition awaiting dispatch.

In addition, a filling factory would have provision for limited proofing and testing of its munitions; and burning grounds for disposal of waste explosive material.

Outside of this danger area, but still within the factory site, would be located:

- administration offices;
- pay offices;
- workshops;
- a medical centre;
- changing rooms;
- contraband storage (for items prohibited in the danger areas, e.g. matches, tobacco, etc.);
- search rooms;
- canteens (as many as 40 in some of the large factories).

== UK World War I National Filling Factories ==
At the start of the War munition filling was carried out at Woolwich Arsenal, however it was soon realised that a massive increase in production of munitions was required. A 2015 study by Historic England looked into the 170 National Factories created in England by the Ministry of Munitions in the early part of WW1 (covering 174 locations), among these were the National Filling Factories, including a National Fuse Factory, 5 Trench Warfare Filling Factories, and 3 National Factories for Filling and Assembling Chemical Shells. Filling of small bore ammunition was increased by the creation of 4 government cartridge factories. Most of the national filling factories followed similar designs with large sites with small lightweight buildings well separated and connected by raised walkways which had lightweight rail lines so materials could be wheeled between buildings on trolleys. Shells, fuses, packing cases, and explosives were brought in by rail to the edge of the factory, and completed munitions left by rail. All the filling work was carried out within the large 'clean area' by a large, mainly female, workforce. People entering the clean area had to change clothes and leave behind anything that could strike a spark, not just matches and lighters but all metal, even hairclips - one male worker being fined £5 for being in possession of 2 nails that he had used to replace a lost button on his trousers. (Note: News Snippet, Londonderry Sentinel, 31 July 1917, p4)

While some of the factories were entirely built and managed by the Ministry of Munitions, others had local management. For instance NFF 10 was built on 109 acres of land owned by White and Poppe Ltd who had changed from engine production to manufacturing fuse bodies and 18pdr shell sockets. White and Poppe was given the contract for building the fuse filling plant in September 1915, and when completed in September 1916 it ran under their management. Unfortunately a problem with fuse failures caused a cessation of production in December 1916. The fault identified and the factory reorganised it restarted production in February 1917 as NFF 21, but still under White and Poppe management. (Note: Review of the Work of National Filling Factory No 21, Coventry, The National Archive - MUN 5/155/1122/3/66)

When the Armistice came in November 1918, production was rapidly terminated and the female workforce laid off. A few sites, with much reduced male staff levels, were used for decommissioning unwanted ammunition. After clean up, most of the buildings, equipment, and stores were sold off by public auctions in the early 1920s.

| Name | Location | From | Peak Workforce | Products | Notes |
|---|---|---|---|---|---|
| Royal Arsenal | Woolwich | 17th Century | 80000 | Varied | The only filling factory in UK in 1914, eventually closing in 1967. Covering 1285 acres. |
| National Filling Factory No. 1 | Barnbow, Leeds | April 1916 | 16000 | Quick Fire Ammunition (18pdr to 6 inch) | 296 acres. Of the 13315 employees in Mar 1917, 12150 were women. Produced 50,000 shells per week by August 1918. An explosion in December 1916 killed 34 women. Since 2016 it is a scheduled monument (No 1415057) as the most complete surviving filling factory. |
| National Filling Factory No. 2 | Aintree, Liverpool | Jan 1916 | 8599 | Quick Fire Ammunition (18pdr to 6 inch) | 175 acres. Partly built to complete 18pdr shells shipped in from USA via Liverpool |
| National Filling Factory No. 3 | Willesden Lane, Perivale | Dec 1915 | | Components (fuses, detonators, gaines and primers) | 120 acres. In August 1917 a central experimental unit was set up to study methods for filling and assembling for all the NFFs. (Note: Official History of the Ministry of Munitions, Vol X, The supply of munitions, H.M. Stationery Office, 1922) An explosion in Sept 1919 (when being used for decommissioning munitions) caused damage but didn't escalate, but raised questions about the safety of munitions in London suburbs. (Note: Alarming London Explosion, Sheffield Independent, 19 Sept 1919, p5) |
| National Filling Factory No. 4 | Georgetown, Glasgow | Jan 1916 | 11088 | Quick Fire Ammunition (13pdr, 18pdr, 3.4 inch, 12 inch shells) | Area 250 acres, then second factory increased it to 540 acres. |
| National Filling Factory No. 5 | Quedgeley, Gloucester | Mar 1916 | 6364 | 18pdr, 4.5 inch, 60pdr shells, cartridges and primers | 308 acres. Site cleared in mis 1920s, but was reused in 1939 as RAF Quedgeley |
| National Filling Factory No. 6 | Long Eaton, Chilwell | Feb 1916 | 7500 | High explosive shells (4.5 inch to 15 inch shells) | 208 acres. Suffered serious explosion 1 July 1918, 134 killed, 250 injured. Work restarted the next day. Chilwell produced over 19 million artillery shells by the end of the war. |
| National Filling Factory No. 7 | Hayes | Oct 1915 | 12500 | Components (fuses, Gaines) plus 18pdr shells also 4.5 and 6 in howitzer | Also known as Emergency Factory No.2. 200 acres. Had a separate 93acre explosives magazine at Northolt. This had a capacity of 2000 tons of explosive, and about 100 tons a day were delivered to Hayes by rail. |
| National Filling Factory No. 8 | Sumner St, Southwark | Sept 1915 | | Components (101-103 fuses, Gaines) | 60,000 sq feet factory also known as Emergency Factory No. 1 |
| National Filling Factory No. 9 | Banbury | Apr 1916 | 1463 | Mainly high explosive shells (over 4.5 inch), some naval mines and chemical filling (HS) | 142 acres. Used until 1924 for breaking down unwanted ammunition. |
| National Filling Factory No. 10 | Whitmore Park, Coventry | Mar 1916 | 3864 | Components (fuses, Gaines) for 18 pdr shells | 109 acres. Managed by White and Poppe Ltd. Due to a number of fuse failures in late 1916, once remedied this was renamed as NFF 21 |
| National Filling Factory No. 11 | Abbey Wood | Jan 1916 | | Components (fuses, Gaines) | Managed by Kings Norton Metal Co, works built adjacent to their factory. Closed cApril 1918. |
| National Filling Factory No. 12 | Cardonald, Glasgow | Jan 1916 | | Components (detonators, gaines and primers) | Near Cardonald railway station. Managed by Nobel's Explosives Ltd. |
| National Filling Factory No. 13 | White Lund, Morecambe | Jul 1916 | | High explosive shells (over 4.5 inch) | 250 acres. Managed by Vickers Ltd. Works destroyed by fire and explosion October 1917. A planned rebuild was abandoned in Spring 1916 except for a small portion for chemical gas filling. |
| National Filling Factory No. 14 | Rotherwas, Hereford | Nov 1916 | ~8000 | High explosive shells (over 4.5 inch) | 519 acres. Built to provide backup capacity should Chilwell or Morecambe be out of commission. Changed to breaking down unwanted ammo after the war at least until 1921. |
| National Filling Factory No. 18 | Burry Port, Pembrey | Jun 1915 | 1050 | Filling 4.5in, 6in and 8in shells | Opened in June 1915, later nationalised. From May 1917 changed to disassembling defective munitions to recover components |
| National Filling Factory No. 21 | Whitmore Park, Coventry | Feb 1917 | | Components (fuses, Gaines) for 18 pdr shells | National Filling Factory no 10 was renumbered 21 after a fault in the production system had been fixed, as front line troops had learned to avoid munitions from NFF 10 |
| National Filling Factory No. 22 | Gainsborough, Lincolnshire | Feb 1918 | | Naval mines | 143 acres. |
| National Filling Factory No. 23 | Chittening, South Gloucestershire | June 1918 | 1100 | Filling shells with chloropicrin, later with dichloroethyl sulphide from the National Smelting Company at Avonmouth Docks | Operated by Nobel Explosives. By November 1918, Chittening had produced 85,424 mustard gas shells; but at a human cost of 1213 cases of associated illness, including two deaths which were later attributed to influenza. |
| National Filling Factory No. 24 | Balmoral Road, Watford | | | 2in and 3in mortar rounds and rifle grenades | 28 acres. Also known as Trench Warfare Filling Factory No 1 at Watford. Listed as NFF 24 in sale details Jan 1919. (Note: National Filling Factory (No 24) Watford, Daily News (London), 23 Jan 1919, p2) |
| National Filling Factory No. 25 (Note: Watford and South West Herts in the Great War, Eugenia Russell, Quentin Russell, Pen and Sword, 31 Aug 2015, p70) | Bushey Mill Lane, Callowland, Watford | May 1916 | | Heavy trench mortar and aerial bombs. Some chemical filling. | Watford No 2 Trench Warfare Filling Factory. 40 acres, 26 sheds, 300 ton magazine. Chemical filling moved to Greenford Chemical Shell Assembly Station in Jan 1917. |
| National Filling Factory No. 28 | Greenford | Jan 1917 | | Chemical shell filling | Also known as Chemical Shell Assembling Station. Formerly Greenford dye works. |
| Trench Warfare Filling Factory | Slade Green, Erith | Oct 1915 | | 2 inch mortars, used after the war for dismantling munitions | Probably had an NFF designation. 14 acre site near to the Thames Munition Works |
| Trench Warfare Filling Factory | Denaby, Rotherham | Jan 1916 | | 3 inch Stokes mortar bombs | Probably had an NFF designation. Built near to (and managed by) British Westfalite's factory |
| Trench Warfare Filling Factory | Stevenage Road, Fulham | Aug 1915 | | 3 inch Stokes mortar bombs, ball grenades | Prossibly NFF 27. Nationalisation of W.E.Blake Explosives Loading Co factory in Feb 1916. 3 acres with separate explosives magazines at Worm Holt Farm, Shepherd's Bush. |
| Trench Warfare Filling Factory | Barlby Road, Selby | 1916 | 234 | 3 inch 'Russian' shell | Ardol Ltd (who had a carbon monoxide by-product of food manufacture), built and operated a factory to make phosgene and load into shells. Nationalised in June 1916. Shell filling moved elsewhere c1917. |
| National Fuse Factory | Chaul End, Luton | Mid 1917 | 3000 | Fuses | 28 acre site built, staffed, and managed by George Kent Ltd who were already making munitions at Biscot Road, Luton |

The recruitment of workers for the factories was specifically aimed at women, and in general the workforce at the filling factories was 80 to 90% women. An advert in the papers in January 1917 (Note: More Women Workers - 8000 Wanted for Munitions, Evening Mail, 19 Jan 1917, p8) was aimed at recruiting 8000 women workers for a munitions filling factory in North-West London (Willesden Employment Exchange). They had to be aged 20 to 40, and live not more than an hour away, though a lodgings register was available. The work was generally 54 hours a week, 'but may be more', and the pay was 27 shillings, day and night shifts had to be undertaken by all workers, a fortnight of each at a time. For more information on women in munitions during WW1 see munitionettes.

=== WW I references ===
- Cocroft, Wayne D. (2000). Dangerous Energy: The archaeology of gunpowder and military explosives manufacture. Swindon: English Heritage. ISBN 1-85074-718-0.

== UK World War II Royal Ordnance Factory, filling factories ==
Some of these filling factories were temporary "war duration" only factories and they closed after the end of World War II. Other filling factories were designed to be permanent and to remain open after the War. However, only ROF Glascoed is still open and is now part of BAE Systems.

Twenty World War II filling factories were planned, but only 16 were built. The two largest UK filling factories were:

- ROF Chorley (Filling Factory No. 1)
- ROF Bridgend (Filling Factory No. 2)

The other filling factories were:

- ROF Glascoed (Filling Factory No. 3)
- ROF Rotherwas (Filling Factory No. 4) (Note: This was a re-opened WW1 National Filling Factory)
- ROF Swynnerton (Filling Factory No. 5)
- ROF Risley (Filling Factory No. 6)
- ROF Kirkby (Filling Factory No. 7)
- ROF Aycliffe (Filling Factory No. 8)
- ROF Thorp Arch (Filling Factory No. 9)
- ROF Queniborough (Filling Factory No. 10)
- ROF Brackla (Filling Factory No. 11)
- ROF Swindon (Wootton Bassett) (Factory No. 12) (Note: Factory planned and number assigned, but not built)
- ROF Macclesfield (Factory No. 13)
- ROF Ruddington (Filling Factory No. 14)
- ROF Walsall (Filling Factory No. 15)
- ROF Elstow (Filling Factory No. 16)
- ROF Featherstone (Filling Factory No. 17)
- ROF Burghfield (Filling Factory No. 18) (Note: Later part of the Atomic Weapons Establishment (AWE)))
- ROF Tutbury (Factory No. 19)
- ROF Northampton (Factory No. 20)

=== WW II references ===
- Cocroft, Wayne D. (2000). Dangerous Energy: The archaeology of gunpowder and military explosives manufacture. Swindon: English Heritage. ISBN 1-85074-718-0.
- Hay, Ian. (1949). R.O.F. The Story of the Royal Ordnance Factories: 1939–48. London: His Majesty's Stationery Office.
- Hornby, William (1958). Factories and Plant. (History of The Second World War: United Kingdom Civil Series). London: HMSO and Longmans, Green and Co.
- Kohan, C.M. (1952). Works and Buildings. (History of The Second World War: United Kingdom Civil Series). London: HMSO and Longmans, Green and Co.

== See also ==
- List of Royal Ordnance Factories
- Munitionette
