= Royal Ordnance Factory =

Former type of UK government munitions factory

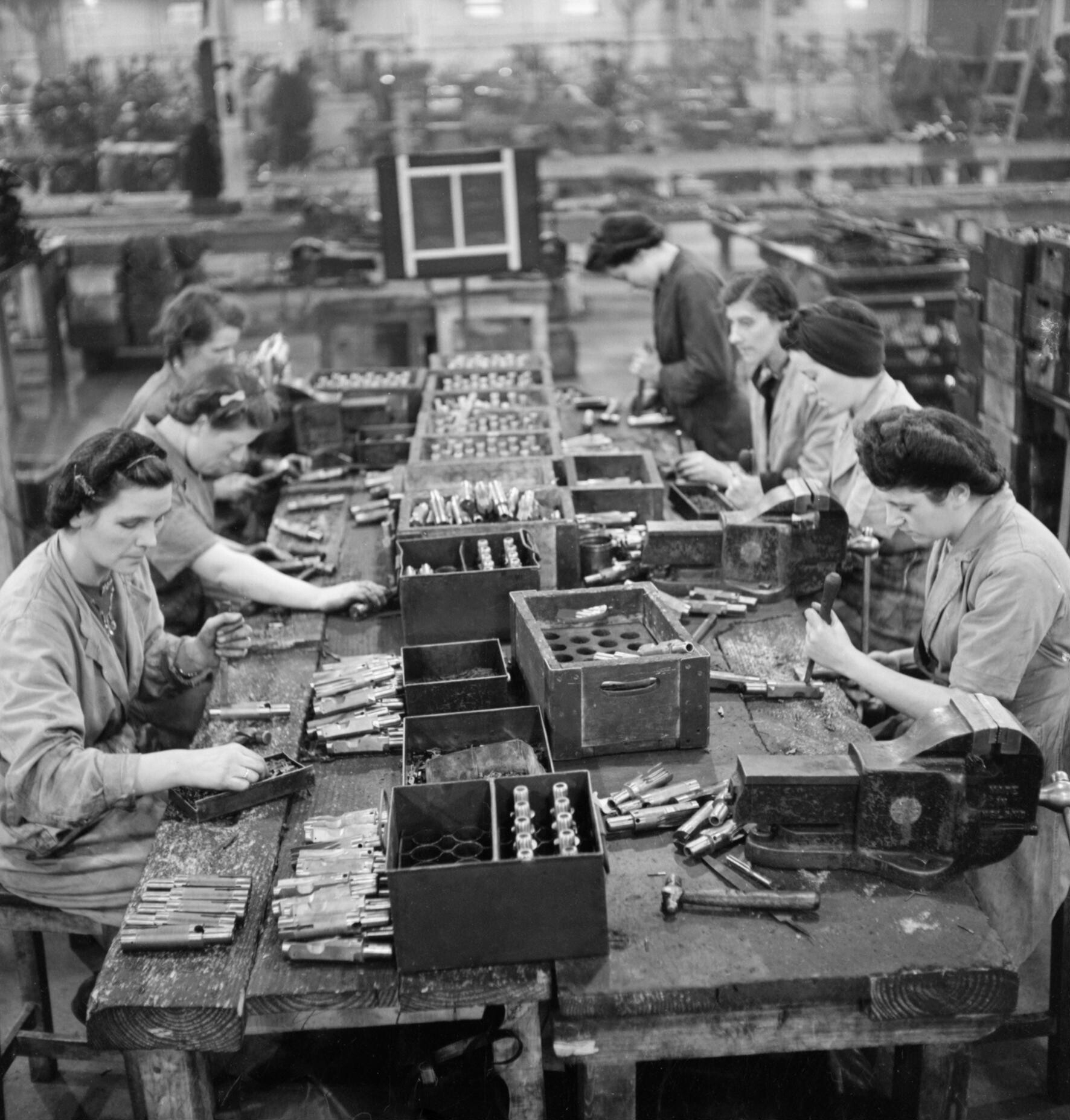
Workers at the Royal Ordnance Factory Fazakerley, 1943

Royal Ordnance Factories (ROFs) were munitions factories run by the UK government during and after the Second World War. The three main types of factories were engineering, filling and explosives, and these were dispersed across the country for security reasons. ROFs were the responsibility of the Ministry of Supply and later the Ministry of Defence until privatisation in 1987.

== Origin ==
After the end of the First World War and the resulting closures, the government sold all off the equipment of the National Factories to recoup some of the costs; and in many cases sold the factory buildings as well. So prior to the 1930s, Britain's ordnance manufacturing capability had become concentrated at the Royal Arsenal, Woolwich; and within a small number of large private companies.

In the late nineteenth century, the term 'Royal Ordnance Factories' began to be used collectively of the manufacturing departments of the Royal Arsenal, principally the Royal Laboratory, Royal Gun Factory and Royal Carriage Works, which, though they shared the same site, operated independently of one another. This use of the term is seen in the name of the 1893 Royal Ordnance Factories Football Club; and it continued through the First World War.

The emerging threat of aerial bombing prompted the government to consider dispersing its ordnance factories around the country, particularly away from the London area and the southest of England: these areas being the closest to continental Europe and therefore considered more likely to be bombed. (Note: More details can be found in this article, in the section Location of the ROFs, for what was considered to be the dividing line between safe and unsafe areas.)

== Development ==
The majority of the ROFs were built during the re-armament period, just before the start of the Second World War, to enhance the capacity of the three ordnance sites that had continued in operation after the end of the First World War: the Royal Arsenal, Woolwich, the Royal Gunpowder Factory (RGPF) Waltham Abbey, Essex and the Royal Small Arms Factory, (RSAF) Enfield. These three sites were in or near London and were considered to be vulnerable to aerial bombing from continental Europe.

The Royal Arsenal designed many of the ROFs and was also the agent for the construction of all of the Rifles ROFs, the Medium Machine ROF and the Small Arms Ammunition ROFs. The Ministry of Supply, the Ministry of Works, and two other private companies were agents for the construction of the remaining ROFs.

=== Other Second World War explosive factories ===
A number of Second World War munitions factories were built, and owned, by Imperial Chemical Industries (ICI). These ICI Nobel Explosives owned factories were not considered part of the Ministry of Supply's Royal Ordnance Factory organization, and they were not called ROFs. ICI also managed munitions factories constructed with Ministry of Supply funding. These were known as "agency factories" and three of them became part of Royal Ordnance upon the ROFs' privatisation.

==== Agency factories ====
Some of the ROF filling factories built later, during the Second World War, were government-owned, but managed, as agency factories, by private companies unconnected with the explosives industry. For example, Joseph Lyons & Co ran ROF Elstow throughout the war. Other filling factories were run by Imperial Tobacco, Courtaulds, the Co-operative Wholesale Society (CWS), Metal Closures and Lever Brothers.

== Location of the ROFs ==
The new ROFs were to be built in areas regarded as "relatively safe". Until 1940, this meant from Bristol, in the south, and then west of a line that ran from (roughly) Weston-super-Mare, in Somerset, northwards to Haltwhistle, Northumberland; and then northwestwards to Linlithgow, in Scotland. The South, South East and East of England were regarded as "dangerous" and the Midlands area, including Birmingham as "unsafe". This definition of "safe" area was later changed, and in 1940 ignored in the case of ROF Chorley.

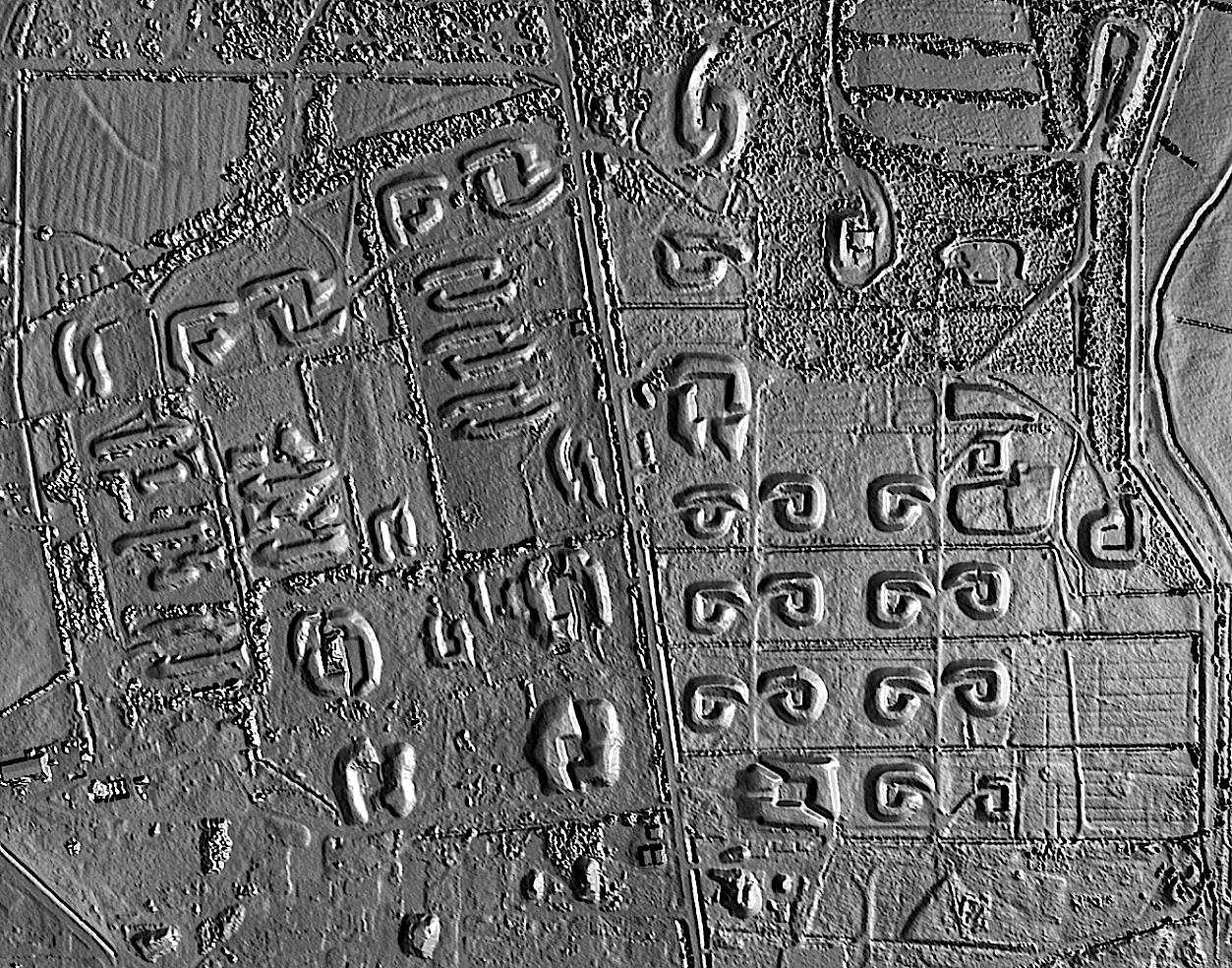
A lidar view of the site of the Royal Ordnance Factory at Puriton in Somerset

Siting of the individual ROFs north and west of this line was of vital importance. ROFs involved with explosive manufacture or filling needed, on safety grounds, to be located away from centres of population. They needed access to good transport links, such as railways, the availability of adequate workers within reasonable travelling distance, and a plentiful guaranteed supply of clean process water. To avoid the danger of frozen explosives, they tended to be located at or just above sea level. Some ROFs located in Wales and Scotland were the result of political lobbying as these areas had high unemployment rates in the 1930s. The ROFs were guarded by what was to become the Ministry of Defence Police.

== Responsibilities and functions ==
The Royal Ordnance Factories were set up with six generic types of factories:

- Engineering ROFs
- Explosive ROFs
- Filling factories, including small arms ammunition (SAA) filling factories
- Medium Machine Shops, specifically ROF Patricroft
- Rifles ROFs, specifically ROF Fazakerley and ROF Maltby
- Small arms ammunition (SAA) factories

The three main types were: engineering, filling and explosives.

The largest ROFs tended to be the explosive ROFs and the filling factories, as these needed an explosives safeguarding zone around the perimeter of the factory, as well as separation, or reduced separation and traverses between buildings. ROF Bishopton occupied over 2,000 acres (8.1 km^{2}) and ROF Chorley was 900 acres (3.6 km^{2}).

=== Management of the ROFs ===
Each ROF tended to be self-contained, apart from its raw materials: with their own coal-fired power stations, for generating steam for heating and process use, and electricity via high-pressure steam turbines if needed; engineering workshops; plumbers and chemical plumbers; leather workers; electricians; buildings and works departments; housing and hostels for workers; canteens; laundries and medical centres.

The UK's ROFs were set up and operated as production factories. The design of explosives, propellants and munitions was carried out at separate government-owned research and development establishments such as the Research Department, which was initially based at the Royal Arsenal, Woolwich and then Fort Halstead, in Sevenoaks, Kent; and at PERME Waltham Abbey, Essex, which later moved to become RARDE Fort Halstead.

== Workforce ==
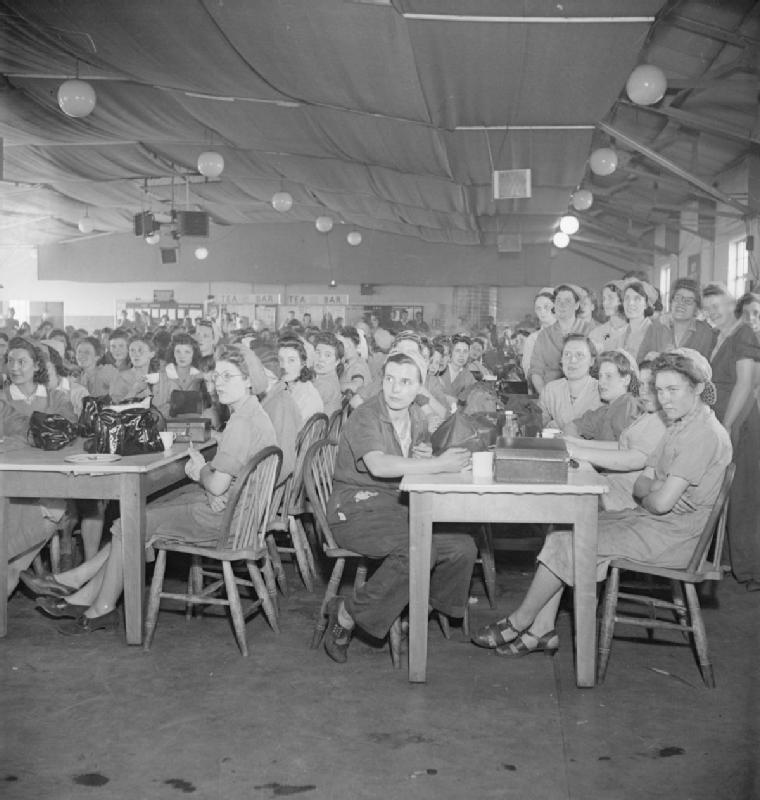
ROF worker canteen, 1943

In 1942, Sir Andrew Duncan reported to the House of Commons that 300,000 people were employed in the 42 Royal Ordnance factories (24 engineering, 8 explosives, and 10 filling factories), of whom 60% were women. Many were girls with secondary school education. MPs voiced concerns about large numbers of workers occupying factories and workers' hostels designed with a lower capacity, and also stated the need to retain open spaces in the hostels in case workers' homes were destroyed in a blitz.

== Post-war history ==
=== Closures of temporary ROFs ===
A number of the ROFs were designated temporary, for use during the war's duration only. They closed shortly after the end of the Second World War. Other ROFs were designated permanent and they remained open into more recent times. In 1957, a Defence white paper led to a reorganisation of the aircraft industry, a restructuring of the British Army and a concentration on missile systems. A number of the permanent ROFs closed in the late 1950s, after the end of the Korean War. Others closed in the 1970s. The largest of these, based at the Royal Arsenal in Woolwich, closed in March 1967.

The temporary ROFs, or ROFs which closed in the 1950s and 1970s, tended to be taken over by other government departments. Some closed ROFs and Admiralty explosive sites, such as the Royal Navy Propellant Factory, Caerwent, were retained by the Ministry of Defence as ammunition storage areas. Others became government industrial estates or trading estates. Others were used as brownfield sites to build prisons or open prisons.

Part of ROF Thorp Arch became the Boston Spa depository of the British Library. Three of the seven hostels that served ROF Swynnerton became a training school for General Post Office (GPO) Telephones, which later became British Telecom, and is now the Yarnfield Park Training and Conference Centre and run by Accenture. ROF Elstow was taken over by the CEGB and became a storage depot. The site has been cleared, and became the new town of Wixams.

=== Trading fund ===
In July 1974, the Royal Ordnance Factories were set up as a trading fund, under the Government Trading Funds Act 1973.

=== Privatisation of the remaining ROFs ===
As part of its privatisation process in the 1980s, the UK government transferred some of the, formerly separate, research and development capability of the Defence Research Establishments into the ROFs. Other parts of the UK's defence research and design capability were later closed down; remained with the UK Ministry of Defence, as Dstl; or became part of QinetiQ.

On 2 January 1985 the majority of the Royal Ordnance Factories were vested in the UK government-owned company Royal Ordnance plc. It was bought by British Aerospace in 1987. The Ministry of Defence Police left most of the ROFs on or within a few years of privatisation.

The small number of ROFs involved in nuclear weapons production, ROF Burghfield and ROF Cardiff, were removed from ROF management and did not pass over to Royal Ordnance upon privatisation. They were transferred to the control of AWRE, which later became the Atomic Weapons Establishment.

== See also ==
- Filling factories
- List of prisons in the United Kingdom
- List of Royal Ordnance Factories
- Royal Arsenal
- Royal Small Arms Factory
- Waltham Abbey Royal Gunpowder Mills
- Ruddington Depot

== Bibliography ==
- Bates, H. E. (n/d). The Tinkers of Elstow: The story of the Royal Ordnance Factory managed by J. Lyons & Company Limited for the Ministry of Supply during the World War of 1939–1945. London: n/p.
- Bowditch, M.R. & Hayward, L. (1996). A Pictorial Record of the Royal Naval Cordite Factory, Holton Health. Warham: Finial Publishing. ISBN 1-900467-01-1.
- Hay, Ian. (1949). R.O.F.: The Story of the Royal Ordnance Factories: 1939 – 48. London: His Majesty's Stationery Office.
- Hornby, William. (1958). Factories and Plant: (History of the Second World War: United Kingdom Civil Series). London: Her Majesty's Stationery Office and Longmans, Green and Co.
- Kohan, C.M. (1952). Works and Buildings: (History of the Second World War: United Kingdom Civil Series). London: Her Majesty's Stationery Office and Longmans, Green and Co.
- Nevell, Mike, Roberts, John & Smith, Jack. (1999). A History of Royal Ordnance Factory, Chorley. Trowbridge: Carnegie Publishing. ISBN 1-85936-063-7.
