= Templeman (surname) =

Templeman is a surname. Notable people with the surname include:

- Alfie Templeman (born 2003), English singer-songwriter, multi-instrumentalist and producer
- Chris Templeman (born 1980), Scottish footballer
- David Templeman (born 1965), Australian politician
- David Templeman (footballer), Scottish footballer
- Geoffrey Templeman (1914–1988), Vice-Chancellor of the University of Kent
- Harcourt Templeman, British screenwriter
- Miles Templeman, Director General of the Institute of Directors
- Nicholas Templeman (by 1478–1515), of Dover, Kent, was an English politician
- Shorty Templeman (1919–1962), American racecar driver
- Simon Templeman (born 1954), British voice actor
- Susan Templeman (born 1963), Australian politician
- Sydney Templeman, Baron Templeman (1920–2014), British judge
- Ted Templeman (born 1944), American record producer
- William Templeman (politician) (1842–1914), Canadian newspaper editor and politician
- William Templeman (chemist) (1883-1919), English chemist, munitions expert and solicitor)
- Willie Templeman, Scottish footballer
