= William Templeman =

William Templeman may refer to:

- William Templeman (politician), Canadian newspaper editor and politician
- William Templeman (chemist), English chemist and munitions expert, army officer and solicitor
- Willie Templeman, Scottish footballer
