= Maud Bruce =

British firefighter

Maud Ellen Bruce
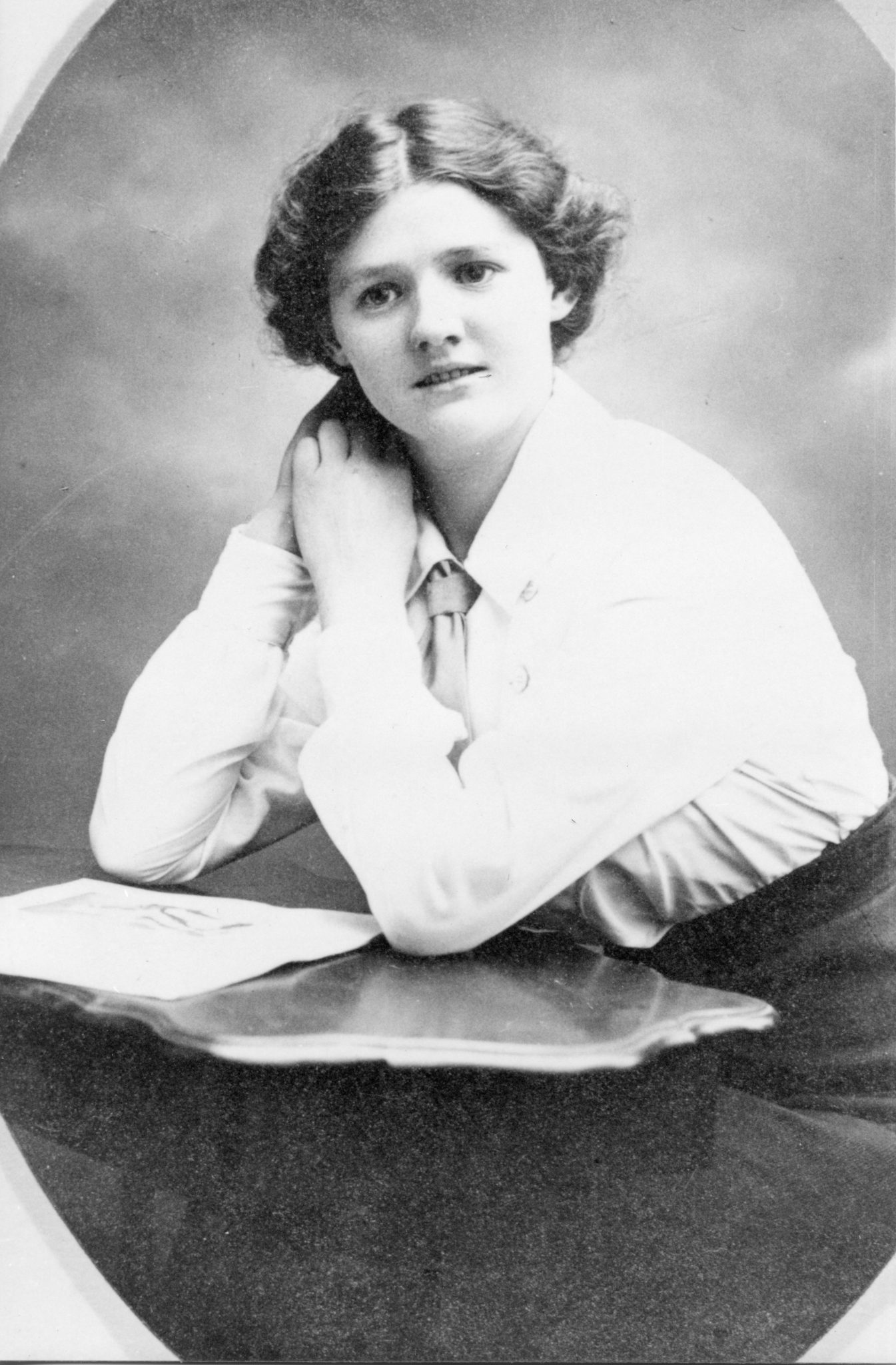
- Born: 20 December 1894
- Died: 8 January 1995 (aged 100)
- Occupation: Munitions Worker
- Era: World War I
- Known for: Being awarded an OBE for her war work at H.M. Factory Gretna
- Honours: Order of the British Empire

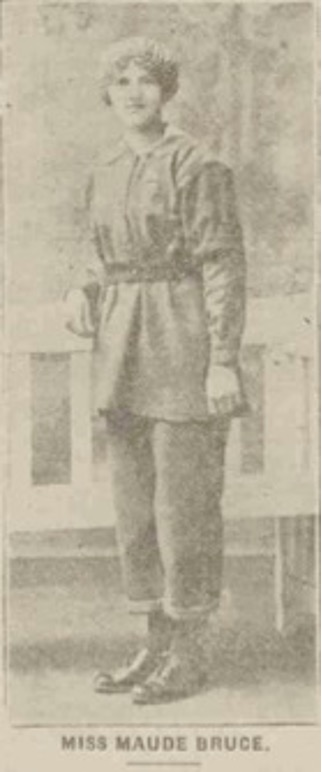
Maud Bruce pictured in the Dumfries and Galloway Standard on 29th August 1917, after she was awarded the OBE.

Maud Ellen Bruce (20 December 1894 — 8 January 1995) was a forewoman and a member of the fire brigade at H.M. Factory Gretna during World War I. She was also the recipient of an O.B.E. for her actions at the factory. In World War Two she worked at ROF Aycliffe, where during an accident with some ammunition, she was severely burnt. She lived to be 100 years old and was one of the first women in Britain to receive plastic surgery.

== Early life ==
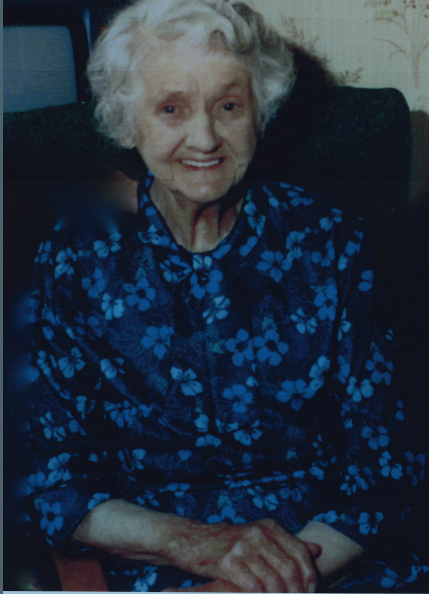
Maud Bruce on her 100th birthday.

Maud Ellen Bruce was born on 20 December 1894. She lived with her parents, Thomas and Emma, and her eight siblings and grew up in Coundon, County Durham. Her father worked as a coalminer. By 1911, aged sixteen, she worked as a general domestic servant.

== Work at H.M. Factory Gretna during World War I ==
Prior to World War I, the Gretna area was mostly agricultural, but during hostilities "the largest cordite factory in the UK was established" in response to the need for munitions. This new wartime industry meant a dramatic increase in the local population as people migrated to the area to work. The Gretna Girls was a collective nickname given to women munition workers at HM Factory Gretna in World War One. One of these workers was Maud Bruce. She arrived at H.M. Factory Gretna in late 1916 to work as a forewoman of the cotton drying house in the Dornock section. Maud was billeted at Grenville Hostel, Eastriggs.

She was a member of the fire brigade and in charge of thirty girls. Maud was described as having ‘gained rapid promotion’ during her time at Gretna, and as being ‘exceedingly popular’ with her staff and superiors.

Maud was recognised for two notable events during her time at Gretna. The first occurred around April 1917, when a fire broke out at night in the cotton drying machine. Maud used a hose to subdue the flames, and then the fire brigade put out the fire.

On the second occasion, Maud similarly demonstrated her calm and collected approach to danger. This event was outlined in detail in the local newspaper, which described how she climbed up a ladder to the top of a drying machine and prevented a fire from spreading.

In June 1917, Maud was awarded a British Empire Medal by The Duke of Buccleuch, K.T., who was Lord Lieutenant of the county of Dumfries.

This event was held at the central offices of the factory in front of a number of staff. It was stated that ‘each of the recipients of the medal stepped forward, and was cordially shaken hands with by the Duke, who pinned on the medals, and as he did so there were cordial cheers from the assembly.’ The Duke said that ‘it was extremely gratifying to realise that deeds of heroism were also being performed by factory workers at home, and especially by women.’

Maud was awarded the OBE in August 1917 "for admirable behaviour in charge of the women’s fire brigade at a fire at an explosive factory."

In the aftermath of her deeds, Maud was interviewed by The Standard. She is described as wearing "khaki trousers and jacket", not realising at the time of the interview that she had been awarded the OBE.

Maud did get some media attention from her actions and the honours bestowed upon her. Usually these took the form of celebrating the work of women war workers. In the Sheffield Weekly Telegraph, she was referred to as a "plucky munitions lass" and is cast as a heroine; the news story details the "thrilling story" that led to her being awarded the Munitions Medal which, it was stated, "has rarely been more pluckily won."

== Personal life ==
In 1920, Bruce married Thomas Edward Nunn in Shildon, Durham. Thomas served in the Royal Irish Regiment during World War I and was discharged due to disability in 1917. Thomas was awarded the British War Medal and the Victory Medal during his service in World War One. In 1920, the couple welcomed their first child, Raymond, and they had their second son, John, in 1922.

== Work at ROF Aycliffe during World War II ==
During World War II, Maud again worked in munitions. She had to carry an identity card upon entry and exit to the factory. As at H.M. Factory Gretna, the munition workers at Aycliffe were working with dangerous chemicals and many suffered adverse effects on their health. Later in life Bruce would have to wear "specially tinted spectacles" and have the morning newspaper read out to her because of the damage done to her eyesight. She began working at the factory when it opened in 1941. She later commented, "I loved the work until the accident. I was in hospital over five months." This accident happened in 1943, when "some ammunition exploded, and she was very severely burned on her face, arms, hands and chest. She spent six months in Darlington Hospital and then returned to the factory until the end of the war."

To recover from this injury, Bruce had plastic surgery—still a relatively new procedure mostly performed on servicemen who suffered awful injuries in the course of their duties. Later in life, she would have a distinctive mark from these injuries; "Mrs Nunn had had some plastic surgery on her face – she’d put her hands up to shield her face in the explosion. I think she was one of the first people to have it and her skin was kind of wrinkle free in those areas."

== Later life and death ==
After the war ended, Bruce worked as a school dinner lady. Her husband took his life in 1954, and her eldest son, Raymond, predeceased her by 11 years. Bruce lived to be a 100. She celebrated with her family and friends at the nursing home in which she lived, and received a letter from the Queen. Her big birthday was reported in the local press and Bruce spoke to reporters about her long life. "I didn’t want to reach 100, I think it is too long to live, but I am now looking forward to my birthday." She also recalled the moment she was awarded the OBE, saying: "the OBE was the most memorable experience of my life. It was a great honour and I am very proud of the award." Maud Bruce died in 1995.

== See also ==
- Munitionette
- H.M. Factory Gretna
- ROF Aycliffe
- The Gretna Girls
