= Templeman =

Templeman may refer to:

- Templeman (surname)
- Templeman, Newfoundland and Labrador, Canada
- Templeman, Virginia, United States
