= The Gretna Girls =

Women munition workers during WWI

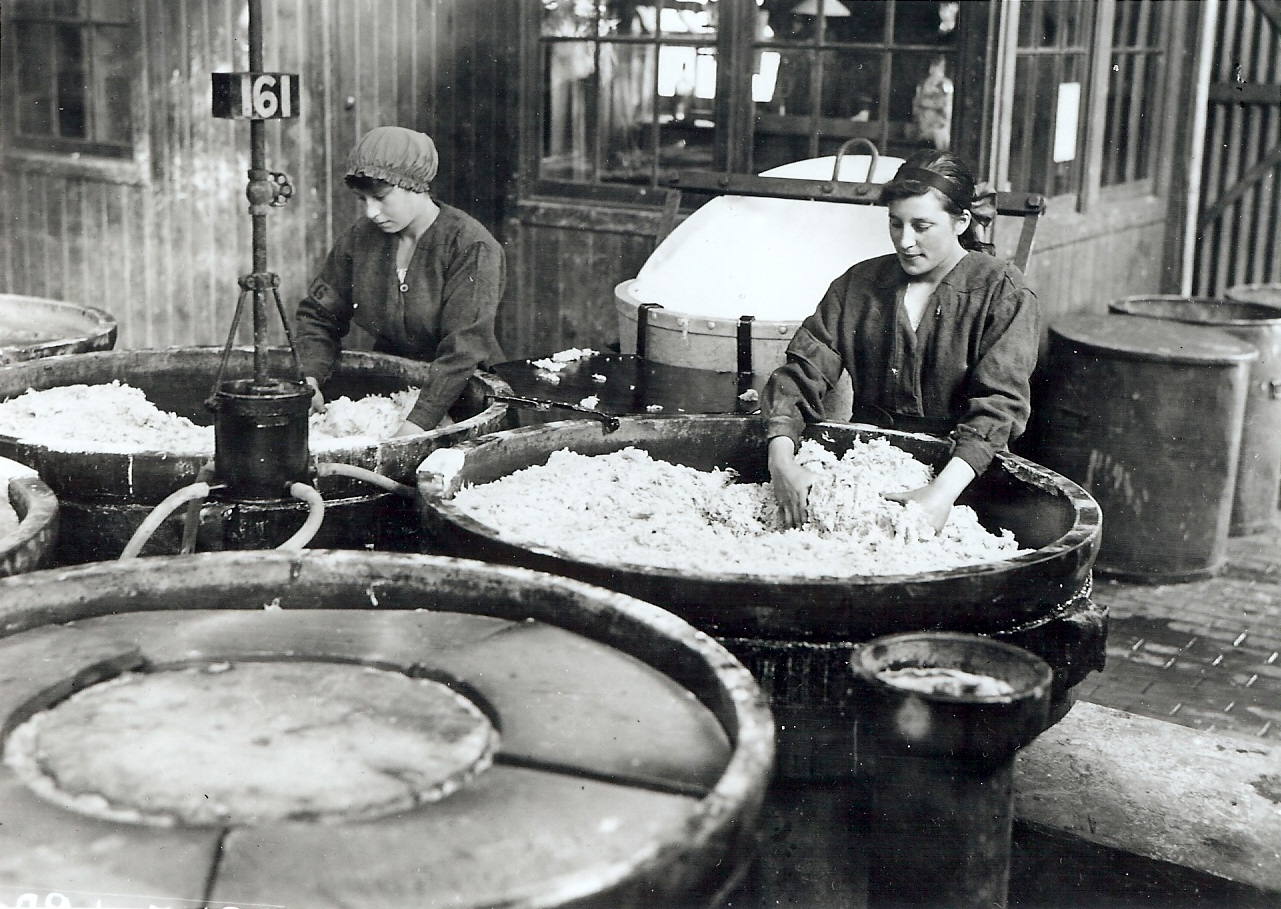
Gretna Girls at HM Factory Gretna

The Gretna Girls was a collective nickname given to women munition workers at HM Factory Gretna in World War One. Women came from all over the United Kingdom to work at the factory, but many were drawn from the surrounding areas of Scotland and Northern England.

== Working in munitions ==
The Gretna Girls were a small part of the one million women who worked in munitions during World War One. The makeup of The Gretna Girls reflected the countrywide trends for munitions workers: the majority were working class young women. However, as Chris Brader points out, unusually for Government factories, munition workers at Gretna came from an even younger demographic—a large proportion was under eighteen years of age. There were no creche facilities at Gretna, unlike other munition factories. The highest number of women employed at the factory was 11,576 in 1917, but this figure dropped to 6,285 by October 1918.

== Impact on the local area ==
The influx of workers to the factory led to the building of two townships, Eastriggs and Gretna. Many of the Gretna Girls lived in group hostels which were staffed by matrons. These temporary buildings were bitterly cold in the winter and the women living there had little to no privacy—with only curtains separating sleeping areas. The huge scale of the buildings of these townships and accommodation had an impact on the local area. In 1916, the State Management Scheme was introduced in Carlisle and Gretna. This scheme involved the nationalisation of the brewing and selling of alcohol, bringing both under state control. The rationalisation for this introduction was the protection of morals of the munition workers. In addition to this, the factory was patrolled by the newly formed Women's Police Service. The women police's duties involved the searching of munitions workers for contraband items, and the maintaining of their morals.

== Health and accidents ==
Some Gretna Girls were exposed to dangerous chemicals and fumes in the course of their work at the factory. Many women reported feeling dizzy, and some lost their hair, teeth, and their skin turned a shade of yellow. Many attributed later health problems to their war work.

There were also accidents and explosions at the factory. Victoria May McIver was working in the Cotton Preparation Department when she had an accident that led to her losing part of her left arm. She presented Queen Mary and King George V with a bouquet of flowers on their royal visit to the factory in 1917.

== Notable Gretna Girls ==
- Maud Bruce was a forewoman at HM Factory Gretna, and was awarded an OBE for her bravery in putting out a fire.
- Euphemia Cunningham worked in the nitro-glycerine section in the factory.

== See also ==
- Female roles in the World Wars
- Munitionette
- HM Factory Gretna
