= Entries in the Romford Garden Suburb exhibition =

Coordinates: 51.59°N 0.20°E

There were over 140 entries in the Romford Garden Suburb exhibition, that took place in 1911 in Gidea Park, Romford, now in the London Borough of Havering. Each house had its own designer, who were either of national or local acclaim, with, on occasion, several dwellings being designed by a single architect. The object of the new suburb, which was built on land belonging to Gidea Hall, then occupied by the Liberal Member of parliament, Herbert Raphael, was, according to his liberal parliamentary colleague John Burns, to "provide families with a well-built, modern home regardless of class or status" and "to bring the towns into the country and the country into the towns".

One hundred architects and urban planners took part in the Romford development, including William Curtis Green, Philip Tilden, Raymond Unwin, Richard Barry Parker, and Baillie Scott. The exhibition opened in the Spring of 1911, and with it came the establishment of several roads, including Balgores Lane, Crossways, Heath Drive, Heaton Grange Road, Meadway, Parkway, Reed Pond Walk, Risebridge Road, and Squirrels Heath Avenue. Of the 140 houses built in 1911, six were designated as Grade II listed buildings by Historic England.

== Entries ==
Grade	Explanation of the Grade II listed designation
II	Buildings of national importance and special interest; 91.7% of all listed buildings are in this class and it is the most likely grade of listing for a home owner.

Plot number	Road	Architect	Builder	Class	Image
1003	Balgores Lane	T. Gerard Davidson	J. Smith & Sons, Ltd.	Class II	
1006	Balgores Lane	G. Berkeley Willis	Y. J. Lovell & Sons	Class II	
1007	Balgores Lane	C. A. Lewin	C. A. Lewin & Sons	Class I	
1008	Balgores Lane	Herbert J. Axten	J. D. Hay	Class I	
1012	Balgores Lane	A. F. C. Bentley	H. Butcher & Sons	Class I	
1015	Balgores Lane	Spencer Murch	J. Mills	Class I	
1016	Balgores Lane	K. D. Young & H. Hall	W. Moss & Sons	Class I	
1017	Balgores Lane	K. D. Young & H. Hall	W. Moss & Sons	Class I	
1024	Balgores Lane	J. D. Mathews & H. Mathews	Bull & Esdaile	Class I	
27	Crossways	May & Perrin	Mattock & Parsons	Class II	
19	Heath Drive	Johnson & Boddy	Y. J. Lovell & Son	Not for competition	
20	Heath Drive	Johnson & Boddy	Y. J. Lovell & Son	Not for competition	
21	Heath Drive	Johnson & Boddy	Y. J. Lovell & Son	Not for competition	
39	Heath Drive	C. Quaife May	W. F. Blah Ltd.	Class I	
40	Heath Drive	R. Bennett & B. Wilson Bidwell	Jeffs Bros.	Class I	
41	Heath Drive	Richard Barry Parker & Raymond Unwin	Dowsing & Davis	Not for competition	
42	Heath Drive	E. Turner Powell	F. Rider & Son	Not for competition	
43	Heath Drive	William Curtis Green	Faulkner & Son	Class I	
44	Heath Drive	A. E. Sawday	Y. J. Lovell & Sons.	Class I	
45	Heath Drive	Ronald P. Jones	J. A. Hunt	Not for competition	
46	Heath Drive	Ronald P. Jones	J. A. Hunt	Not for competition	
47	Heath Drive	Ronald P. Jones	J. A. Hunt	Not for competition	
48	Heath Drive	Ronald P. Jones	J. A. Hunt	Not for competition	
49	Heath Drive	William Stewart	Partridge Brothers	Class I	
57	Heath Drive	G. L. Pepler & E. J. Allen	Grace & Marsh	Class I	
348	Heaton Grange Road	Stanley P. Schooling	Dowsing & Davis	Class I	
256	Meadway	Fair & Myer	Jones & Andrews	Class II	
257	Meadway	Gripper & Stevenson	A. Harris	Class II	
258	Meadway	Johnson & Boddy	Y. J. Lovell & Son.	Class II	
259	Meadway	T. Gordon Jackson	W. Hunnable	Class II	
260	Meadway	Norman Jewson	G. E. Hough & Co.	Class II	
261	Meadway	Buckland & Farmer	W. Moss & Sons.	Class II	
262	Meadway	Buckland & Farmer	W. Moss & Sons.	Class II	
263	Meadway	Philip Tilden	W. Hunnable	Class II	
264	Meadway	C. H. Rose	G.E. Hough & Co.	Class II	
265	Meadway	A. P. Starkey	W. Maxey & Son	Class II	
266	Meadway	Arthur H. Moore	J. Butterfield	Class II	
267	Meadway	E. C. P. Monson	Finsbury Pavement House	Not for competition	
268	Meadway	H. T. B. Spencer	W. Moss & Sons	Class II	
269	Meadway	Cecil H. Hignett	H. Hurst	Class II	
270	Meadway	A. L. Favell	Parkin, Bailey & Coates	Class II	
271	Meadway	R. Bennett & B. Wilson Bidwell	Jeffs Bros.	Class II	
272	Meadway	C. M. Crickmer	Mattock & Parsons	Class II	
273	Meadway	C. M. Crickmer	H. Hurst	Class II	
274	Meadway	William Curtis Green	Faulkner & Son.	Class II	
275	Meadway	Harold Kennard & Cox	Hammond & Myles	Class II	
276	Meadway	G. H. Barrowcliff & E. T. Allcock	W. Moss & Sons	Class II	
277	Meadway	Burgess & Myres	W. Moss & Sons	Class II	
278	Meadway	Robert van 't Hoff & Maxwell	Y. J. Lovell & Son	Class II	
279	Meadway	T. Thrwhitt	W. Hunnable	Class II	
280	Meadway	Reginald T. Longden	W. Moss & Sons	Class II	
281	Meadway	C. A. Lewin	A. Lewin & Son	Class II	
282	Meadway	Ernest Willmott	W. Moss & Sons	Class II	
283	Meadway	Hobbs & Gale	Adamson & Son	Class II	
284	Meadway	Hastwell Grayson	W. J. Lovell & Sons	Class II	
286	Meadway	Lionel F. Crane	W. Hunnable	Class II	
287	Meadway	Jones, Phillips & Whitby	H. Hurst	Class II	
288	Meadway	Percy Houfton	W. Moss & Sons	Class II	
290	Meadway	Burgess & Myres	W. Moss & Sons	Class II	
291	Meadway	Herbert A. Welch	W. Moss & Sons	Class II	
199	Parkway	Reginald T. Longden	W. Moss & Sons	Class I	
200	Parkway	Theodore Gregg	W. Moss & Sons	Class I	
201	Parkway	Forbes & Tate	King & Sons	Class I	
202	Parkway	Fair & Myer	Jones & Andrews	Class I	
203	Parkway	D. Bamford & Aitken	Jones & Andrews	Class I	
204	Parkway	S. Warwick	H. A. Hall	Class I	
205	Parkway	C. Quaife May	W. Blay, Ltd.	Class I	
206	Parkway	R. L. Wall	Allen Bros.	Class I	
207	Parkway	S. B. K. Caulfield	G. E. Hough & Co	Class I	
208	Parkway	Geoffry Lucas	W. Moss & Sons	Class I	
209	Parkway	S. B. K. Caulfield	G. E. Hough & Co	Class I	
210	Parkway	Burges & Myres	W. Moss & Sons	Class I	
211	Parkway	Burges & Myres	W. Moss & Sons	Class I	
212	Parkway	T. Gordon Jackson	W. Hunnable	Class I	
213	Parkway	Alfred Cox	G. E. Hough & Co	Class I	
329	Parkway	Michael Bunney & Clifford Makins	W. M. Moss & Sons, Ltd	Not for competition	
332	Parkway	P. Cart de Lafontaine	J. D. Hey	Class I	
337	Parkway	Frank Nicholls	J.& J. Dean	Class I	
214	Reed Pond Walk	Joseph Seddon	John Long	Class I	
215	Reed Pond Walk	S. B. K. Caulfield	G. E. Hough & Co	Class I	
216	Reed Pond Walk	R. Annan	H. R. Horsey	Class I	
217	Reed Pond Walk	Mauchlen & Weightman	Isaac Bewley	Class I	
218	Reed Pond Walk	E. J. May	W. F. Blay	Not for competition	
219	Reed Pond Walk	H. Townsend Morgan	W. Moss & Son	Class I	
220	Reed Pond Walk	Jones, Phillips, & Whitby	H. Hurst	Class I	
221	Reed Pond Walk	T. E. Legg	Shepherd Bros	Class I	
222	Reed Pond Walk	F Endel Rosser	W. J. Lovell & Son	Class I	
226	Reed Pond Walk	T. Millwood Wilson	W. Moss & Sons	Class I	
227	Reed Pond Walk	C. M. Crickmer	Mattock & Parsons	Class I	
228	Reed Pond Walk	C. M. Crickmer	H. Hurst	Class I	
229	Reed Pond Walk	Cecil A. Sharp	G. E. Hough & Co	Class I	
230	Reed Pond Walk	Charles W. Yates & C. R. Merrison	H. Butcher & Sons	Class I	
231	Reed Pond Walk	Baillie Scott	W. Maxey & Son	Class I	
232	Reed Pond Walk	Baillie Scott	W. Maxey & Son	Class I	
233	Reed Pond Walk	T. R. Bridson	W. Moss & Sons	Class I	
234	Reed Pond Walk	Fyvie & Wilson	F. Millar Noble	Class I	
235	Reed Pond Walk	W. W. Scott Moncrieff	W. F. Blay Ltd.	Class I	
236	Reed Pond Walk	Frank Foster	G. E. Hough & Co	Class I	
237	Reed Pond Walk	A. Randall Wells	W. Moss & Sons	Class I	
238	Reed Pond Walk	M. S. Briggs & C. H. Rose	Foster & Dicksee	Class I	
239	Reed Pond Walk	Richard Barry Parker & Raymond Unwin	H. Hurst	Class I	
240	Reed Pond Walk	Reginald T. Longden	W. Moss & Sons	Class I	
241	Reed Pond Walk	Edwin Gunn	F. W. Jarvis	Class I	
242	Reed Pond Walk	Ernest G. Theakston	F. W. Jarvis	Class I	
243	Reed Pond Walk	Gripper & Stevenson	A. Harris	Class I	
244	Reed Pond Walk	Clough Williams-Ellis	Allen Bros	Class I	
245	Reed Pond Walk	Buckland & Farmer	W. Moss & Sons	Class I	
246	Reed Pond Walk	Buckland & Farmer	W. Moss & Sons	Class I	
248	Reed Pond Walk	Reginald T. Longden	W. Moss & Sons	Class II	
249	Reed Pond Walk	Newton & Youngman	G. E. Hough & Co	Class I	
251	Reed Pond Walk	F. Smith Coldwell	W. Hunnable	Class I	
252	Reed Pond Walk	John H. Curry	G. E. Hough & Co	Class I	
253	Reed Pond Walk	Not stated	Vail & Shore	Not in competition	
254	Reed Pond Walk	T. E. Eccles	G. E. Hough & Co	Class I	
255	Reed Pond Walk	Herbert A. Welch	Henry Lovatt Ltd	Class I	
294	Risebridge Road	Mauchlen & Weightman	Isaac Bewley	Class II	
295	Risebridge Road	T. D'Oyly Bulkeley	H. Butcher & Son	Class II	
296	Risebridge Road	Edgar Bunce	W. Moss & Son	Class II	
297	Risebridge Road	Joseph Seddon	John Long	Class II	
298	Risebridge Road	E. R. Danford	G. F. Sharman	Class II	
299	Risebridge Road	Harry E. Rider	W. J. Fryer & Co	Class II	
300	Risebridge Road	Charles Spooner	Dowsing & Davis	Not in competition	
301	Risebridge Road	H. S. East	W. Moss & Sons	Class II	
302	Risebridge Road	Charles W. Yates	H. Butcher & Sons	Class II	
304	Risebridge Road	A. Reynolds Chard	R. J. Truscott	Class II	
305	Risebridge Road	Frank Sherrin	J. Brown & Son	Class II	
309	Risebridge Road	F. Osler	H. Butcher & Son	Class I	
310	Risebridge Road	H. T. B. Spencer	W. Moss & Sons	Class I	
312	Risebridge Road	E. R. Danford	G. F. Sharman	Class I	
314	Risebridge Road	Walter Gray Ross	G. E. Hough & Co	Class II	
316	Risebridge Road	Gripper & Stevenson	A. Harris	Class II	
317	Risebridge Road	Norman Hick	Butcher & Sons	Class II	
319	Risebridge Road	Robert F. Hodges	Henry Lovatt	Class II	
320	Risebridge Road	S. E. Tarrant	Shepherd Bros	Class II	
321	Risebridge Road	W. W. Scott Moncrieff	W. F. Blay Ltd	Class II	
322	Risebridge Road	Gripper & Stevenson	A. Harris	Class II	
324	Risebridge Road	G. Gordon Samsung	Vail & Shore	Class II	
326	Risebridge Road	Bamford & Aitken	Y. T. Lovell & Son	Class II	
327	Risebridge Road	J. Myrtle Smith	P. R. Paul	Class II	
1046	Squirrels Heath Avenue	Ernest Willmott	W. Moss & Son	Class I	
1047	Squirrels Heath Avenue	Ernest J. Mager	Jas. Smith & Sons, Ltd	Class I	
1048	Squirrels Heath Avenue	Ernest J. Mager	Jas. Smith & Sons, Ltd	Class I	
1049–1054	Squirrels Heath Avenue	C. R. Ashbee; Gripper & Stevenson	R. Emmott	Not in competition	
1068–1073	Squirrels Heath Avenue	C. R. Ashbee; Gripper & Stevenson	R. Emmott	Not in competition	
1089	Squirrels Heath Avenue	Gripper & Stevenson	W. Emmott	Class II	
1090	Squirrels Heath Avenue	Gripper & Stevenson	W. Emmott	Class I	
1091	Squirrels Heath Avenue	Gripper & Stevenson	W. Emmott	Class I	

Note: The source for this list is The Book of the Exhibition of Houses and Cottages, Romford Garden Suburb, Gidea Park, pp. 61–144.
