= Euphemia Cunningham =

World War One munitions worker, awarded OBE for bravery

Euphemia Cunningham OBE BEM
- Born: 1892; Edinburgh
- Died: 2 August 1989; Wellington New Zealand
- Burial place: Karori Cemetery Public section, plot 628M
- Other names: Euphemia Culbert Baxter; known as Effie
- Occupation: munitions worker
- Employer: HM Factory, Gretna
- Known for: rescuing women in an explosion at the cordite factory

Euphemia Culbert Cunningham OBE BEM (later Baxter; 1892 – 2 August 1989) was a World War One munitions worker at HM Factory, Gretna, who was the first person from Edinburgh to be awarded a Medal of the Order of the British Empire for her bravery in rescuing injured workers, during an explosion in the cordite factory.

== Life ==
Euphemia Cunningham was born in Edinburgh in 1892, and had four brothers. Her father was a Gordon Highlander. She worked in a printing factory in Edinburgh, but in October 1915, as three of her brothers had died in World War I, she chose to join the 11,000 women involved in secret war work at the munitions factory in Gretna. The Gretna Girls was a collective nickname given to women munition workers at HM Factory Gretna in World War I.

Her role in the factory was in the nitroglycerin section, which involved mixing dangerous chemicals nitric acid, sulphuric acid and glycerine with nitro-cotton to make cordite. Within a few months, she was made forewoman of her section. She worked there until the factory closed in 1919.

== Factory explosion ==
In March 1917, there was an evacuation of workers, as an explosion risk was identified at the factory, but not all people could be accounted for and Cunningham promptly returned to search for missing women, despite the danger of explosion. She found and assisted a group to leave, just moments before a sudden explosion which killed one worker and injured nine others.

Her action was recognised in the award of the British Empire Medal (an honour later elevated to the OBE). She was given the medal in a ceremony in April 1918, by the Lord Provost of Edinburgh, as the first recipient in Edinburgh to have this honour. The ceremony took place in the afternoon of Tuesday 2 April in the Edinburgh Council Chamber, in the presence of a number of magistrates and other dignitaries. The medal was awarded "for courage and high example in continuing her duties immediately after a severe explosion."

== Personal life ==
Cunningham married Thomas Baxter of Annan in Edinburgh in 1921, and the pair emigrated to New Zealand in 1924. They lived in Auckland at first, moving to Wellington in 1930.

Euphemia Baxter died on 2 August 1989. She and her husband are both buried in the Karori Cemetery.

== Image ==
The Devil's Porridge Museum has an image of Cunningham with her medal.

== See also ==
- Munitionette
