= Thomas Gilbert Henry Jones =

Australian chemist

Thomas Gilbert Henry Jones CBE (1895–1970) was an Australian organic chemist and academic, notable for his pioneering work in the field of essential oils from Queensland flora natural products.

== Early life ==
Thomas Gilbert Henry Jones was born on 14 July 1895 in Owens Gap, Hunter Valley, New South Wales, the son of Thomas Jones a schoolteacher and his wife Margaret Bell. He attended Newcastle High School, where he won prizes in his junior and senior years. He entered the University of Sydney in 1912 where he studied his BSc, graduating with first class honours in mathematics and chemistry in 1915 and winning the Levy Scholarship for chemistry and physics, the Slade Prize for practical chemistry, the Caird Scholarship for chemistry II and the University medals for mathematics and chemistry. In 1915, Jones was awarded a government research scholarship and was appointed an assistant lecturer and demonstrator at the University of Queensland.

== World War I Service ==
Jones was selected as one of a group of chemists to be sent to England to undertake research for the munitions factories. His work at the HM factory Gretna on the manufacture of nitroglycerin, led to further work on solvent recovery, including that of cordite. At the end of the war he was admitted an associate of the British Chemical Institute (BCI) for his service. He returned to Australia in 1919, resuming his work and was promoted to lecturer in 1921. He earned his DSc from the University of Sydney in 1926.

== Later career ==
Jones was awarded the H. G. Smith Memorial Medal by the Royal Australian Chemical Institute (RACI) in 1930. He served as president of the Queensland branch of the ACI (1938–39) and the president of the Australian branch in 1939. Jones was promoted to professor and head of the chemistry department at the University of Queensland in 1940, following the death of Professor L.S. Bagster. He was appointed a member of the University Senate from 1944 to 1968, the dean of the Faculty of Science from 1942 to 1949 and 1960–61. He was president of the professorial board from 1951 to 1956, and served on every senior committee, including that of the library for twelve years. As acting president of the professorial board in April 1957, he addressed a public meeting of 2500 people in Brisbane's City Hall, protesting a new bill of the then Gair government, which threatened the university's ability to make autonomous appointments.

Jones was awarded a CBE in 1960 and retired in 1965. He received an honorary LLD from the University of Queensland in 1960 and the University of Newcastle in 1966.

He published over 40 papers during his career.

== Personal life ==
Jones married Vera Haines, a dispensing chemist in Gympie in 1923. They had two children. He died on 11 August 1970 in Brisbane.

== Legacy ==
Jones was honoured with a stone grotesque in the Great Court of the University of Queensland placed on the Forgan Smith building. An annual lecture is presented in his name at the University of Queensland in the School of Chemistry of Molecular Biosciences.

== Memberships ==
- Biochemical Society, London
- American Chemical Society
- Grandmaster, United Grand Masonic Lodge of Queensland

== Published works ==
- Jones, T. G. H., & Robinson, R. (1917). Experiments on the orientation of substituted catechol ethers. Journal of the Chemical Society, Transactions, 111: 903-929.
- Jones, T. G. H., & Smith, F. (1923). Notes on the essential oil of Daphnandra aromatica. Proc. Roy. Soc. Queensland. 35: 61-62.
- Jones, T. G. H., & Smith, F. (1923). The composition of the volatile oil of the leaf of Daphnandra aromatica. Proc, Roy. Soc. Queensland. 35: 133-136.
- Jones, T. G. H., & Smith, F. B. (1925). Olefinic terpene ketones from the volatile oil of flowering Tagetes glandulifera. Part I. Journal of the Chemical Society, Transactions, 127, 2530-2539.
- Jones, T. G. H., & Berry-Smith, F. (1925). The essential oil of Australia Menthas. 1. Mentha satureoides. Proceedings of the Royal Society of Queensland. 37: 89-91.
- Jones, T. G. H., & Smith, F. B. (1925). Olefinic Terpene Ketones from the Volatile Oil of Flowering Tagetes glandulifera. Part II. Journal of the Chem. Soc. 127: 2530.
- Jones, T. G. H. (1926). Olefinic terpene ketones from the volatile oil of flowering Tagetes glandulifera. Part II. Journal of the Chemical Society, 129, 2767-2770.
- Jones, T. G. H., & White, M. (1928). The essential oil of Eucalyptus andrewsi from Queensland. Proc. Roy. Soc. Queensland, 40, 132, 133.
- Jones, T. G. H., & Smith, F. B. (1928). Campnospermonol, a ketonic phenol from Campnospermum brevipetiolatum. Journal of the Chemical Society, 65-70.
- Jones, T. G. H., & Smith, F. B. (1930). The volatile oil of Queensland sandalwood. Proceedings of the Royal Society of Queensland. 41: 17-22.
- Jones, T. G. H., & White, M. (1931). Essential oils from the Queensland flora. III. Agonis luehmanni. Proc. Roy. Soc. Queensland. 43: 24-27.
- Jones, T. G. H. (1932). Essential oils from the Queensland flora. IV. Ago-nis elliptica. Proc. Roy. Soc. Qld. 43: 3-5.
- Jones, T. G. H., & Lahey, F. N. (1933). Essential oils from the Queensland flora. Part V. Eriostemon glasshousiensis. Proceedings of the Royal Society of Queensland, 44: 151-152.
- Jones, T. G. H. (1934). Reactions of Tagetone. I. Proc. Roy. Soc. Queensland. 45: 45.
- Jones, T. G. H., & Harvey, J. M. (1936). Essential oils from the Queensland flora. Part VIII. The identity of melaleucol with nerolidol. Proc. R. Soc. Queensland. 47: 92-93.
- Jones, T. G. H., & Lahey, F. N. (1936). Essential oils from the Queensland flora. VII. Melaleuca pubescens. Proceedings of the Royal Society of Queensland. 48: 20-1.
- Jones, T.G.H. and Haenke, W.L. (1937). Essential oils from the Queensland Flora, Part IX-Melaleuca Viridiflora, Part 1. Papers, University of Queensland, Department of Chemistry. 1 (1).
- Jones, T. G. H., & Haenke, W. L. (1937). Essential oils from the Queensland flora. X. Melaleuca linariifolia. Proceedings of the Royal Society of Queensland, 48, 48-50.
- Jones, T. G. H., & Lahey, F. N. (1938). Essential oils of the Queensland flora—Part XIII. Backhousia hughesii. Proc. Roy Soc. Qld. 49: 152-153.
- Lahey, F. N., & Jones, T. G. H. (1938). Essential oils from the Queensland flora. XV. Backhousia bancroftii, Papers, University of Queensland, Department of Chemistry 1(8): 41-42.
- Lahey, F. N., & Jones, T. G. H. (1939). Essential oils from Queensland flora Part XVII, The essential oil of Evodia littoralis and the occurrence of a new phenolic ketone. Papers, University of Queensland, Department of Chemistry. 1(13).
- Lahey, F.N. and Jones, T.G.H. (1939). Essential oils from the Queensland flora, XIV-Eucalyptus Conglomerata. Papers, University of Queensland, Department of Chemistry. 1(5).
- Hancox, N.C. and Jones, T.G.H. (1939). 1-a-Phellandrene and its Monohydrochloride, Part 1. Papers, University of Queensland, Department of Chemistry. 1(6).
- Hancox, N.C. and Jones, T.G.H. (1939). A new derivative of Terpinen-4-ol. Papers, University of Queensland, Department of Chemistry. 1 (7).
- Lahey, F.N. and Jones, T.G.H. (1939). Essential oils from the Queensland Flora Part XV. Backhousia Bancroftii and Daphandra Rapandula. Papers, University of Queensland, Department of Chemistry. 1 (8).
- Jones, T.G.H. (1939). The reduction of Tagetone to Tagetol. University of Queensland Papers, Department of Chemistry. 1(11).
- Lahey, F.N. and Jones, T.G.H. (1939). The constitution and synthesis of Conglomerone. University of Queensland Papers, Department of Chemistry. 1(12).
- Hancox, N.C., Jones, T.G.H. (1939). Optically pure 1-a-Phellandrene. University of Queensland Papers, Department of Chemistry. 1(14).
- Lahey, F. N., & Jones, T. G. H. (1939). Essential oils from Queensland flora XIV Eucalyptus conglomerata. In Proc. Roy. Soc. Qld. 51: 10-13.
- Lahey, F. N., & Jones, T. G. H. (1939). Essential oils from the Queensland flora. XVII. Evodia littoralis and the occurrence of a new phenolic ketone. Univ. of Queensland Papers, Dept. Chem., 1(13), 4.
- Lahey, F.N and Jones, T.G.H. (1939). Essential oils from the Queensland Flora, XVI. Eucalyptus Microcorys. Papers, University of Queensland, Department of Chemistry. 1(9).
- Jones, T. G. H., & Oakes, H. C. (1940). The crystalline solid formed in the oil of Melaleuca linariifolia. Univ. Queensl. Pap., Dep. Chem, 1(18), 1-3.
- Jones, T.G.H. and Lahey, F.N. (1942). The ultra-violet absorption spectra of Tagetone and related ketones. Papers, University of Queensland, Department of Chemistry. 1 (22).
- Jones, T. G. H., & Lahey, F. (1943). Essential oils of the Queensland flora. Part XIX. The essential oils of Halfordia kendack. Proceedings of the Royal Society of Queensland. 55: 85-86.
- Jones, T. G. H., & Wright, S. E. (1946). Essential oils from the Queensland flora. 21. The essential oil of Evodia Elleryana. Univ. Queensland Papers, Dept. Chem, 1(27), 1-7.
- Davenport, J.B., Jones, T.G.H. and Sutherland, M.D. (1949). The essential oils of the Queensland flora, part XXIII: a re-examination of the essential oil of Melaleuca Inarifolia. Papers of the Department of Chemistry, University of Queensland. 1 (36).
- Jones, T.G.H., Lahey, G. and Sutherland, M. (1949). Essential oils of the Queensland flora, Part XXIV, The essential oil of Calythris tetragona lab from the Glasshouse Mountains. Papers, University of Queensland, Department of Chemistry. 1 (37).
