= Albert Marsden =

Australian cricketer

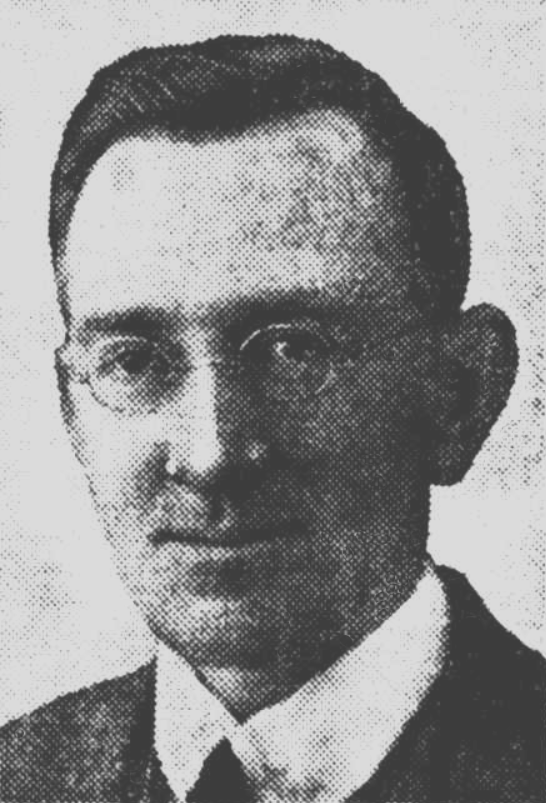

Personal information
- Born: 13 June 1887; Maryborough, Queensland, Australia
- Died: 17 December 1971 (aged 84); Kallista, Victoria, Australia
- Source: Cricinfo, 5 October 2020

Albert Marsden (13 June 1887 – 17 December 1971) was an Australian cricketer. He played in five first-class matches for Queensland between 1919 and 1921. During World War I he had worked at the munitions plant, HM Factory Gretna.

== See also ==
- List of Queensland first-class cricketers
