= Auchterderran =

Coordinates: 56.14°N 03.27°W

Auchterderran: Scottish Gaelic: Uachdar Doirein
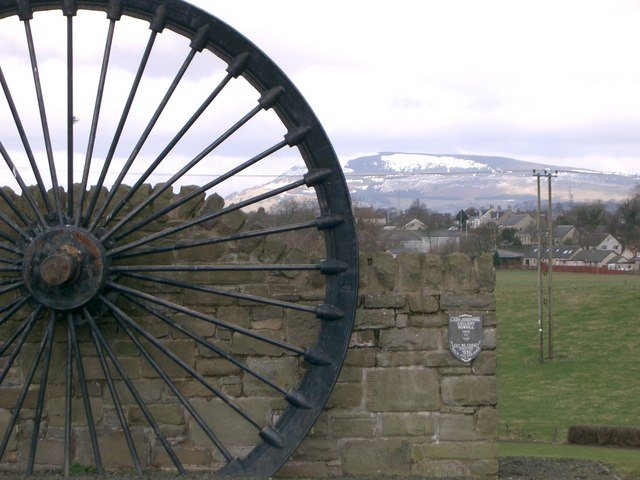
- Mining Memorial, Auchterderran

- Location within Fife
- OS grid reference: NT2195
- Council area: Fife
- Country: Scotland
- Sovereign state: United Kingdom
- Post town: LOCHGELLY
- Dialling code: 01592
- Police: Scotland
- Fire: Scottish
- Ambulance: Scottish
- UK Parliament: Glenrothes
- Scottish Parliament: Cowdenbeath

Auchterderran is a village in Fife, Scotland. It is sometimes thought as part of the larger village, Cardenden, although Cardenden is part of the parish of Auchterderran.

The name derives from Scottish Gaelic, although the first element, urchan, is obsolete in modern Gaelic and obscure. The second element, deòradh, means "a person charged with the safe-keeping of a saintly relic".

== History ==
The church of Auchterderran is first mentioned in the second half of the eleventh century, in connection with the monastery of St Serf's in Loch Leven. It relates that Fothad, son of Malmichel, bishop of St Andrews from c.1053 to 1093, granted the church of Auchterderran to St Serf and the community of Culdees at Loch Leven.

Secular lands are mentioned in the 1150s, when half of the estate of Auchterderran was given over the Priory of St Andrews. This charter mentions the kirk and the kirkton (the settlement immediately surrounding the kirk), which appear as late as 1400 to have remained unappropriated, i.e. the revenues of the church remained with its rector, rather than diverted towards some great religious house or other ecclesiastical institution, with a portion given back to the parish in the form of a vicar's wage. This was unusual in Scotland, where the vast majority of churches' revenues were appropriated by a religious house by the fifteenth century.

This meant that the right to appoint a rector (the right to advowson) was held by a local landholding family. A dispute arose arose in the case of Auchterderran, between the local families of the Livingstons and the Boswells. A settlement by the Lords Auditors found in favour of the Boswells, however it appears that that matter dragged on into the sixteenth century.

== Notable residents ==
- Dr Thomas Goodall Nasmyth FRSE MOH born here in 1855.
