= Dornock =

Coordinates: 54.983°N 3.202°W

Dornock: Scottish Gaelic: Dòrnach
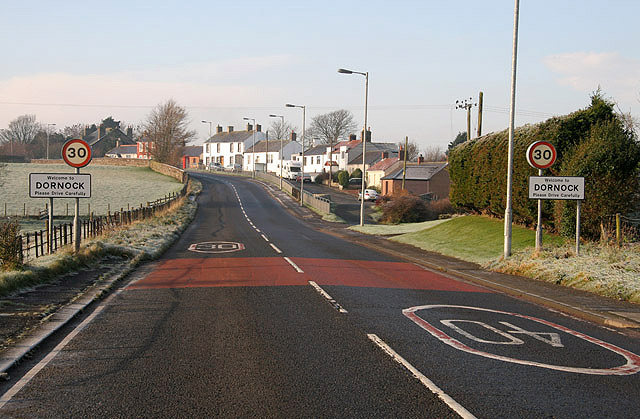
- Dornock

- Location within Dumfries and Galloway
- OS grid reference: NY231660
- Council area: Dumfries and Galloway
- Lieutenancy area: Dumfriesshire
- Country: Scotland
- Sovereign state: United Kingdom
- Post town: ANNAN
- Postcode district: DG12
- Dialling code: 01461
- Police: Scotland
- Fire: Scottish
- Ambulance: Scottish
- UK Parliament: Dumfriesshire, Clydesdale and Tweeddale
- Scottish Parliament: Dumfriesshire

Dornock is a small Scottish village in Dumfries and Galloway, situated about 1 mile (1.6 km) west of Eastriggs and 2 miles (3 km) east of Annan. Dornock is built on land which is 10 to 20 metres (33 to 66 ft) above sea level. Dornock Burn runs east of the village and the railway between Annan and Gretna is north of the village. The mud and sand banks of the Solway Firth are less than one mile away to the south.

== Etymology ==
The name Dornock is either from Cumbric durn + -ǭg or Gaelic dòrnach, meaning 'place of handstones (fist-sized stones)', i.e. stones used as projectiles, or perhaps as cobbles. Watson suggests that the [k] in the current pronunciation may imply a Cumbric rather than Gaelic origin.

== History ==
It is famous for the Battle of Dornock during the Wars of Scottish Independence.

A Solway Parish: A History of Dornock A. Alex. Blaylock (1997?)

== Proposed station at Eastriggs ==
- Eastriggs railway station
