= HM Factory, Gretna =

Cordite Production Plant in Gretna, Scotland, during the First World War

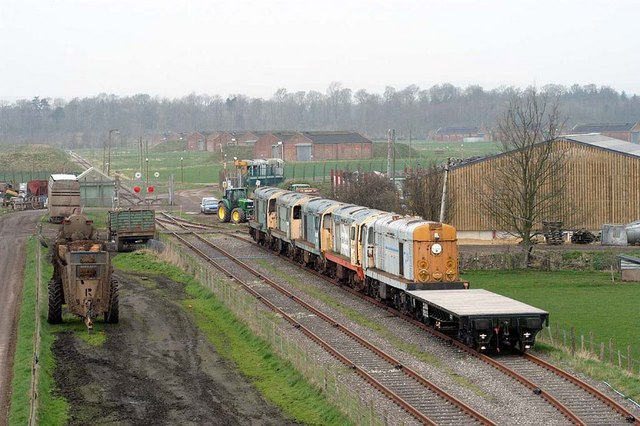
Railway sidings at MOD Depot Smalmstown

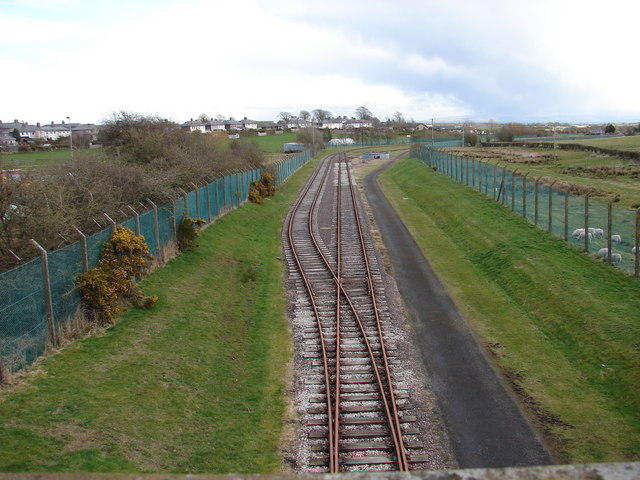
The site of Wylies Halt where workers from Eastriggs township would get trains into the HM Factory, Gretna

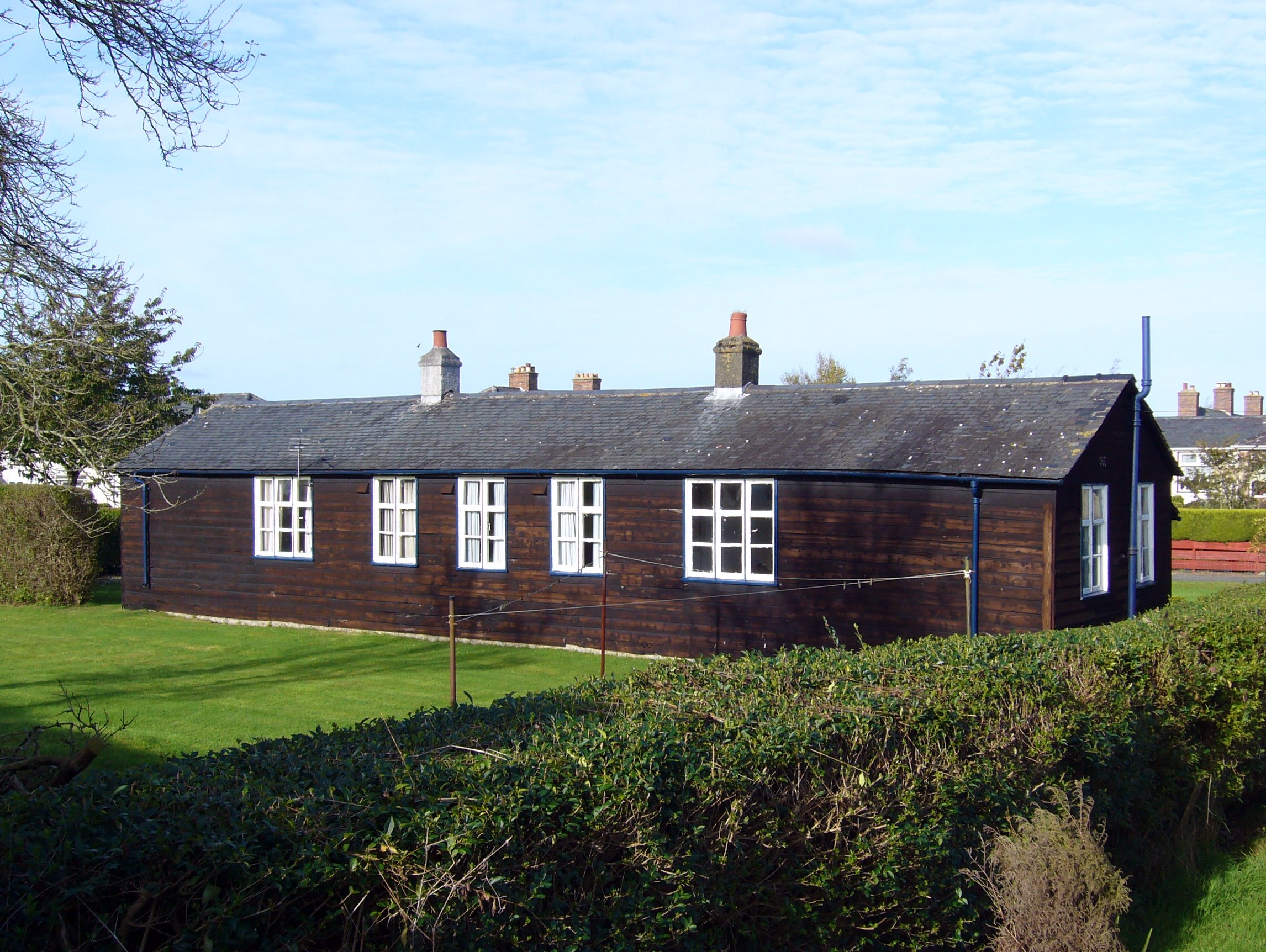
An original wooden workers’ house in Eastriggs

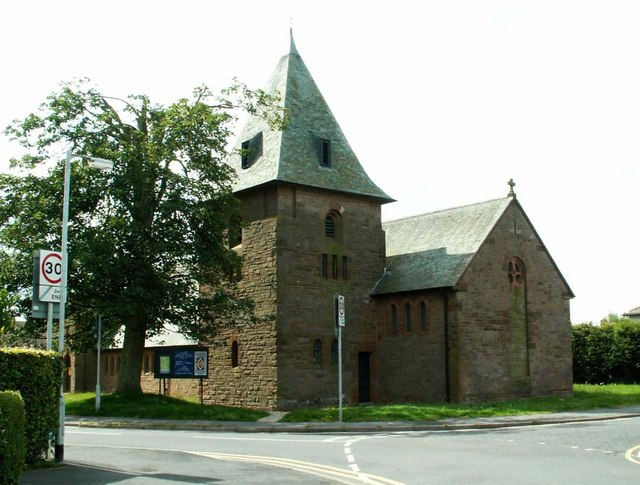
St John's Episcopal Church, Eastriggs was built in 1917.

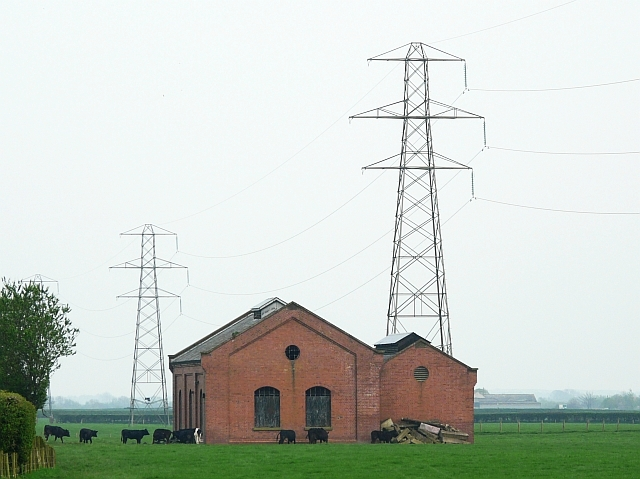
The River Esk pumping station had three electric pumps which could discharge up to 5 million gallons of water a day.

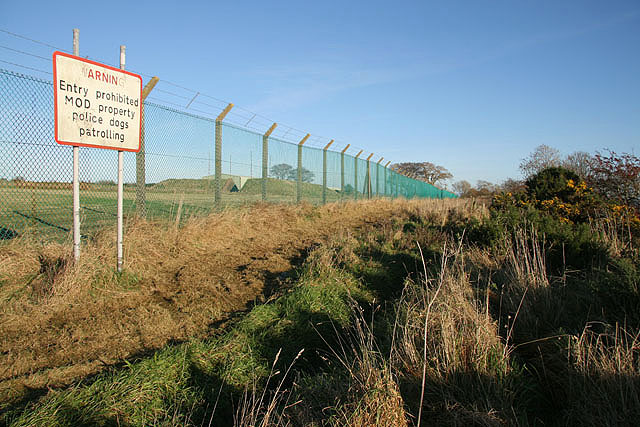
Security fencing around MOD Eastriggs, c. 2008

H.M. Factory, Gretna was Britain's largest cordite factory during the First World War. The government-owned facility was adjacent to the Solway Firth, near Gretna, Dumfries and Galloway. It was built by the Ministry of Munitions in response to the Shell Crisis of 1915. The capital cost was £9,184,000 (£627,300,000 in 2025) and it covered 9,000 acres (36 km^{2}). The cost of working it from September 1916 to September 1918 was £12,769,000, during which time it produced cordite valued at £15,000,000, though it was claimed that without it the cordite would have had to be imported from the US at a cost of £23,600,000.

== Layout ==
H.M. Factory, Gretna stretched 9 miles (14 km) from Mossband near Longtown in the east, to Dornock / Eastriggs in the west straddling the Scottish-English border. The facility consisted of four large production sites and two purpose-built townships. The facility had its own independent transport network, power source, and water supply system.

Site 1, Smalmstown was to the north of Longtown (at 55.011953°N 2.992146°W).
Site 2, Mossband was bounded on the west by the Caledonian Railway (now the West Coast Main Line), and the River Esk on the south and the east (at 54.984°N 3.0240°W).
Site 3, Eastriggs was bounded to the north by the B721 and the Glasgow and South Western Railway, and south by the Solway Firth and the River Sark (at 54.976469°N 3.167419°W).
Site 4, Gretna was contained like Site 3 but it was adjacent to the Gretna township to the east (at 54.986675°N 3.087844°W).

A military, 2 ft (610 mm) narrow gauge railway was used to move materials and supplies around the sites. The network, which had 80 miles (130 km) of track, employed 34 engines. Electricity for the munitions manufacture and the townships was provided by a purpose-built coal-fired power station. The telephone exchange was handling up to 2.5 million calls in 1918. The townships had their own bakeries, laundry and a police force. The laundry could clean 6,000 items daily and the bakeries made 14,000 meals a day.

Water was taken from the River Esk, north of Longtown, through a 42 inches (110 cm) diameter pipe to a pump house. From there it was pumped through a 33 inches (84 cm) main to a reservoir. A filtration/treatment works could handle up to ten million gallons (45,000 m^{3}) a day.

== History ==
Construction work on HM Factory, Gretna started in November 1915 under the general supervision of S P Pearson & Sons. Up to 10,000 Irish navvies worked on the site as well as concurrently building the two wooden townships to house the workers at Gretna and Eastriggs. To prevent problems with the influx of construction and munition workers, authorities implemented the State Management Scheme which curtailed alcohol sales through the nationalisation of pubs and breweries in the vicinity. Medical issues at the facility were overseen by Thomas Goodall Nasmyth.

Munitions production started in April 1916. Engineers and chemists from nations throughout the British Empire were employed to establish the production of RDB Cordite. By 1917 the largest proportion of the workforce were women: 11,576 women to 5,066 men. The women munitions workers were known collectively as The Gretna Girls.

At its peak, the factories produced 1,400 tonnes of Cordite RDB per week, more than all the other munitions plants in Britain combined. Cordite was colloquially known as the "Devil's Porridge"; the name comes from the writings of Sir Arthur Conan Doyle, who visited H.M. Factory as a war correspondent in 1916. He later wrote "The nitroglycerin on the one side and the gun-cotton on the other are kneaded into a sort of a devil's porridge; which is the next stage of manufacture...those smiling khaki-clad girls who are swirling the stuff round in their hands would be blown to atoms in an instant if certain small changes occurred". In 1917, when production reached 800 tons per week, King George V and Queen Mary visited the factory.

Cordite production ceased shortly after the end of World War I in November 1918. The first 25% redundancies were announced in December 1918, and the final closure notice was issued in August 1919, by which time the workforce had been reduced to 3000 from 4000. In September 1919 the special Andrew Barclay 'fireless' locos used to shunt the explosives were sold off (both 2 foot gauge and standard-gauge) along with 40 standard gauge, covered, bogie 'paste' wagons (made by Magor Car Co. of New York, and Pickering Bros of Wishaw), and a further 86 open 4-wheel contractors wagons. In 1919-20 the manufacturing plants were demolished. Although the entire factory site was retained until the early 1920s, eventually all of Site 4 and other parts of the former munition plant were auctioned off for private and agricultural land. The combined sale consisted of more than 700 lots. The two townships of Eastriggs and Gretna and their bakeries were also sold off.

On its closure, Waltham Abbey Royal Gunpowder Mills near London became the sole government-owned cordite factory until an expansion programme started at the outbreak of World War II.

== Notable workers ==
- Agnes Barr Auchencloss, medical officer at Gretna, graduate of the University of Glasgow, and her husband Gosta Lundholm, a Swedish chemist from a family of explosives experts who worked with Alfred Nobel and in South Africa and Scotland.
- Maud Ellen Bruce OBE was forewoman of a 30-woman fire brigade and won an OBE for her bravery in preventing loss of life in two particular serious incidents at the explosives factory.
- Cyril Callister, the inventor of Vegemite, worked as a chemist at Gretna during World War I and met his wife, Katherine Hope Mundell in the area before returning to Australia.
- Former missionary Agnes Marshall Cowan was physician to the accident-prone site in 1917/18.
- Euphemia Cunningham, was a worker awarded the Medal of the Order of the British Empire for Meritorious Service in 1918 for her bravery during an explosion in the factory.
- Arthur Conan Doyle wrote about HM Factory Gretna (calling it 'Moorside', and coined the phase 'the devil's porridge' after seeing the Gretna Girls processing the dangerous mixture on the production line); he was a war correspondent, describing the conditions women lived and worked in.
- William Gidley Emmett FRSE was a British industrial chemist, educationalist, academic author who was manager at the factory.
- Thomas Gilbert Henry Jones was an Australian organic chemist who became a senior chemist in the solvent recovery process. Following a distinguished career in academia, he was later awarded a CBE.
- Albert Marsden was one of a cohort of Australians who worked at the factory, later becoming a first class cricketer in Queensland.
- Thomas Goodall Nasmyth FRSE was medical officer at the factory; later influenced the pasteurisation of milk, and the bonding of whisky, and held senior medical roles.
- Kenneth Bingham Quinan was an American explosives expert who led the construction of H.M. Gretna factory, recruited technical teams and produced training materials, and founded the Institute of Technical Engineers.
- Alfred Thomas Stanley Sissons was an Australian pharmaceutical scientist who worked at the Ministry of Munitions in Scotland during the war; he had an accident with nitrogen peroxide gas which affected his health, but he became dean of the pharmacy college at Monash University.
- William Templeman (chemist) was an English chemist and munitions expert, a schoolmaster, a captain in the Royal Army Ordnance Corps, who had also been a solicitor in England and a lawyer and patent agent in Australia.
- Rebecca West was a feminist and author wrote about the Gretna Girls producing cordite, in a morale boosting piece, and she described the material produced being as 'honey cake'.
- Gretna Margaret Weste (née Parkin) was born nearby in 1917 and named after her father's work place. Arthur Parkin was a volunteer chemist in the munitions factory before the family returned to Australia where Gretna built her career in mycology.
- Herbert Womersley was a chemist involved in gas warfare at the front, and was an international research entomologist; he worked as a chemist in the factory before emigrating to Australia, researching and publishing 200 books on mites, ticks, silverfish and flies, and having seven genera named after himself.
- The Gretna Girls was a collective nickname given to women war workers at HM Factory Gretna.

== Later use ==
Although Site 4 was sold and returned to agricultural use, large parts of the other three sites were retained for ammunition storage by the War Department and later the Ministry of Defence. Beginning in the 1930s, up to 2,500 acres (10 km^{2}) of Site 2, at Mossband, became the Central Ammunition Depot, CAD Longtown. After World War II it became known as Base Ammunition Depot, BAD Longtown. The remaining parts of Site 1, at Smalmstown, were also designated a sub-depot of CAD Longtown.

The Ministry of Supply began using Site 3, to the southeast of Eastriggs, in the 1930s for ammunition storage. The 1,250 acres (5 km^{2}) site was known as CAD Eastriggs. Ammunition was transported from the storage bunkers within CAD Eastriggs using a narrow gauge railway system. Two of the petrol locomotives were used on the Duchal Moor grouse railway near Kilmacolm in Renfrewshire. The site was connected to the Glasgow and South Western Railway at a junction at Eastriggs. In the 1960s, CAD Eastriggs became a sub-depot of CAD Longtown.

The Smalmstown portion of the site closed in 2005, with Eastriggs and Longtown remaining open.

Eastriggs Depot was closed in around 2010, with proposals as of 2021 to repurpose the site as a stabling and maintenance facility for HS2 (High Speed 2) to store up to 28 high speed trains and would be used for cleaning, light maintenance and storage of equipment.

== The Devil's Porridge Museum ==
The Devil's Porridge Museum, Eastriggs, Dumfriesshire, opened on its present site in 2014, one hundred years after the start of the First World War. The Museum commemorates the efforts of its workers during and after the First World War. What was to later become the museum, began perhaps ten years earlier as an exhibition of photographs and records in a local church hall.

== See also ==
- Female roles in the World Wars
- British industrial narrow gauge railways
- British military narrow-gauge railways

== Citations ==
=== References ===
- Brader, Christopher (2001). Timbertown girls : Gretna female munitions workers in World War I (PhD thesis). University of Warwick.
- Cocroft, Wayne D. (2000). Dangerous Energy: The archaeology of gunpowder and military explosives manufacture. Swindon: English Heritage. ISBN 1-85074-718-0.
- Ministry of Munitions of War (1919). H.M. Factory, Gretna: Description of Plant and Process. Dumfries: J. Maxwell & Son, for His Majesty's Stationery Office.
- Rayner-Canham, Marelene & Rayner-Canham, Geoffrey (March 1996). "The Gretna Garrison". Chemistry in Britain. 32 (3). London: Royal Society of Chemistry: 37–41.
- Ritchie, E. (1988). The Gretna Girls. Wigtown: Wigtown District Museum Service.
- Routledge, Gordon L. (1999). Gretna's Secret War: The Great Munitions Factory at Dornock, Eastriggs, Gretna and Longtown and an Account of the Quintinshill Railway Disaster. Carlisle: Bookcase. ISBN 0-9519921-0-4.
- Routledge, Gordon L. (2003). Miracles and Munitions: A concise History of Munitions Manufacture from the time of Alfred Nobel to the building of H.M. Factory Gretna during World War I. Longtown: Arthuret Publishers.
- Ordnance Survey (2005). Eskdale & Castle O'er Forest. 1:25 000 Explorer map, No. 323. Southampton: Ordnance Survey. ISBN 0-319-23685-4. 1:25,000 scale (2.5 inches to 1 mile).
- Longtown Military Railway (Video/DVD). Carnforth: Tele Rail. 1 March 1994.
