= Agnes Barr Auchencloss =

Scottish medical officer

- Born: 30 May 1886; Paisley, Renfrewshire
- Died: 4 July 1972 (aged 86); Edinburgh
- Other name: Lundholm
- Education: MBChB, University of Glasgow (1911)
- Occupation: Medical Officer at HM Factory, Gretna
- Awards: University of Glasgow World War One Roll of Honour

Agnes Barr Auchencloss (30 May 1886 – 4 July 1972) was a Scottish medical officer. She is best known for her work at the World War I munitions factory HM Factory, Gretna. She is included in the University of Glasgow Roll of Honour.

== Family and education ==
Agnes Barr Auchencloss was born in Paisley, Scotland on 30 May 1886 to Jane Crawford and James Currie Auchencloss. Her father was a starch and cornflour merchant. She had a brother, also named James Currie Achencloss. She and her brother were educated at Paisley Grammar School and the University of Glasgow, where she studied medicine. On 24 April 1911 she graduated with a MBChB, having won nine class prizes including first class in Anatomy and Surgery.

She met and married Swedish chemist Gosta Lundholm, whose family had been in Scotland for many years, and had British citizenship. Her husband then worked at the British South African Explosive Company which served the gold mines in the Transvaal, South Africa. Her father-in-law Carl Olof Lundholm had been commissioned by Alfred Nobel to manage his dynamite factory in Ardeer, Scotland.

Their sons, Eric Olof Lundholm (b.1915) and Alan Basil Auchenloss Lundholm (b. 1921) were born at Modderfontein. Between 1915 and 1921 the family lived in Scotland near the munitions factory in Gretna.

They returned to Scotland from South Africa as her husband Gosta was working in a factory at Westquarter making fulminate of mercury. At this time the family lived in Falkirk. They then moved to Ardrossan as Gosta was working at Ardeer.

Her eldest son, Eric was a Royal Engineer in the Middle East during World War II.

Her husband Gotta died in 1969 and she moved in with her son Alan and his wife in Torrance, Glasgow.

She died in the Edinburgh City Hospital on 4 July 1972.

== Career ==
Auchencloss started as house doctor at Royal Alexandra Infirmary, Paisley, then at Kilmarnock Infirmary. In 1914 she was a volunteer doctor in Afrikaaner communities in the veldt in South Africa. From June 1916, her husband returned to Scotland to assist in the building of HM Factory, Gretna a newly established munitions factory. He later became the lead chemist in the factory's nitro-glycerine department.

Auchencloss became the Medical Officer at HM Factory, Gretna for what became 20,000 workers, mainly women. The factory was an extremely dangerous work environment with risks of injuries and explosions. When the King and Queen visited the factory in 1917, Auchenloss was one of those they met and spoke with.

After the war, her husband's work moved again to South Africa and back to Scotland in 1929, where Auchencloss worked as a volunteer, latterly with the Women Citizens' Organisation. She was described as generously giving her time to the sick and injured throughout her life.

Auchencloss was included in the University of Glasgow World War One Roll of Honour.
