= Rigg railway station =

Disused railway station in Scotland

Coordinates: 54.99228°N 3.11474°W

Rigg

General information
- Location: Dumfries and Galloway; Scotland
- Grid reference: NY 287 669
- Platforms: 2

Other information
- Status: Disused

History
- Original company: Glasgow, Dumfries and Carlisle Railway
- Pre-grouping: Glasgow and South Western Railway
- Post-grouping: LMS

Key dates
- Circa 1904: Opened
- 1 Nov 1942: Closed
Location

Rigg railway station was a railway station in Dumfries and Galloway between Eastriggs and Gretna, serving the small village of Rigg. It was two platform station, which opened in 1904, and closed in 1942.

== History ==
The station opened circa 1904 as shown on Ordnance Survey maps. The station closed in 1942, although the line through the station is still open. The station's site has been destroyed by a bridge on the main A75 road. The houses nearby are named the 'Railway Cottages'.

== Adjacent stations ==
Preceding station	Historical railways	Following station
Eastriggs; Line open; station closed	Glasgow and South Western Railway; Glasgow, Dumfries and Carlisle Railway	Gretna Green; Line open; station open
