= Thomas Goodall Nasmyth =

Scottish physician influenced pasteurisation of milk and bonding of whisky

Dr Thomas Goodall Nasmyth FRSE DL JP DPH (28 February 1855 – 16 January 1937) was a Scottish physician, medical author and historian. He served as Medical Officer of Health for Fife, Kinross and Clackmannanshire. He was one of the first (1899) to link Bovine Tuberculosis to the human form, later leading to the widespread use of pasteurisation of milk. He was influential in the decision to bond whisky for 3 years

== Life ==
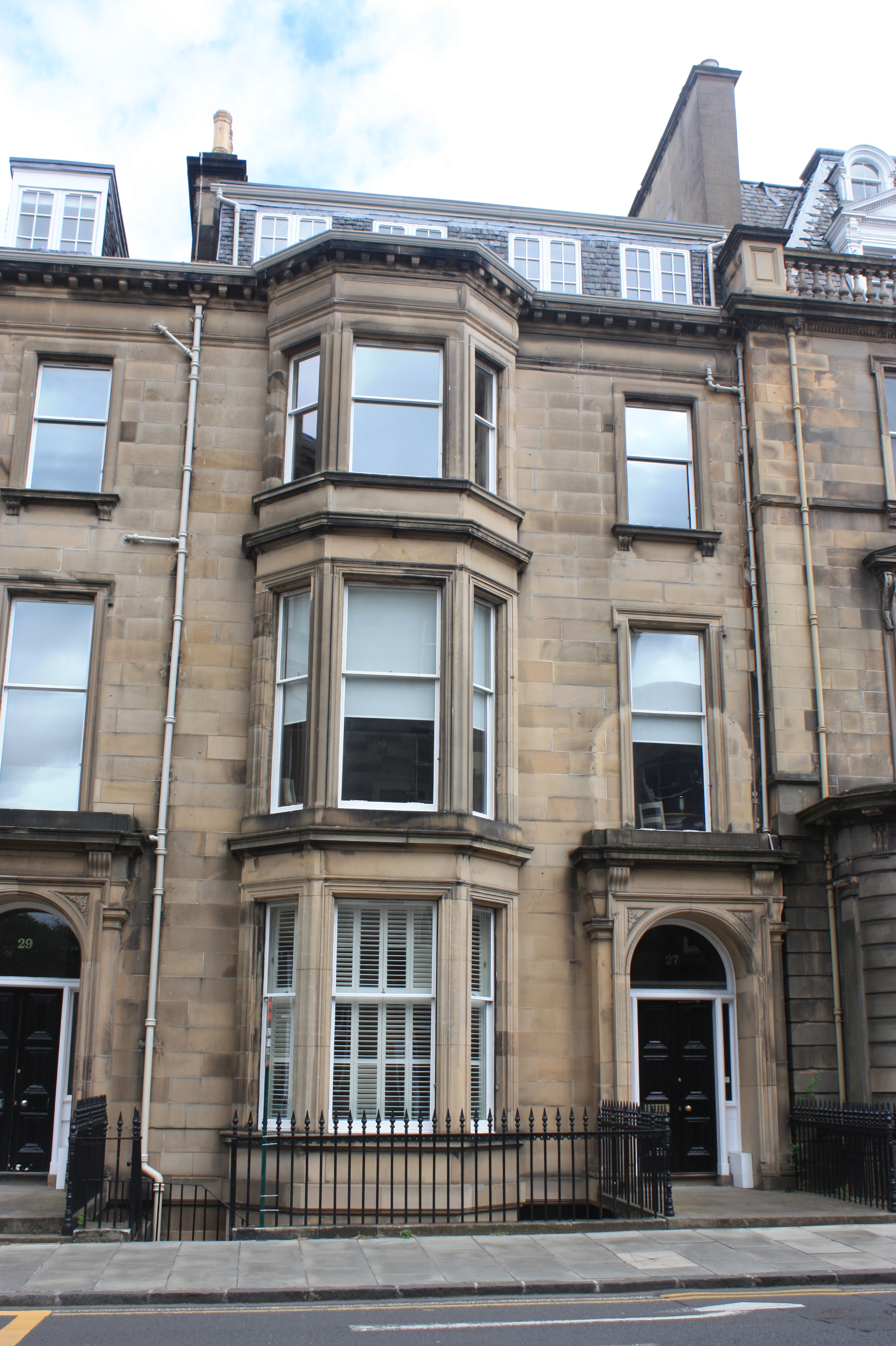
27 Palmerston Place, Edinburgh

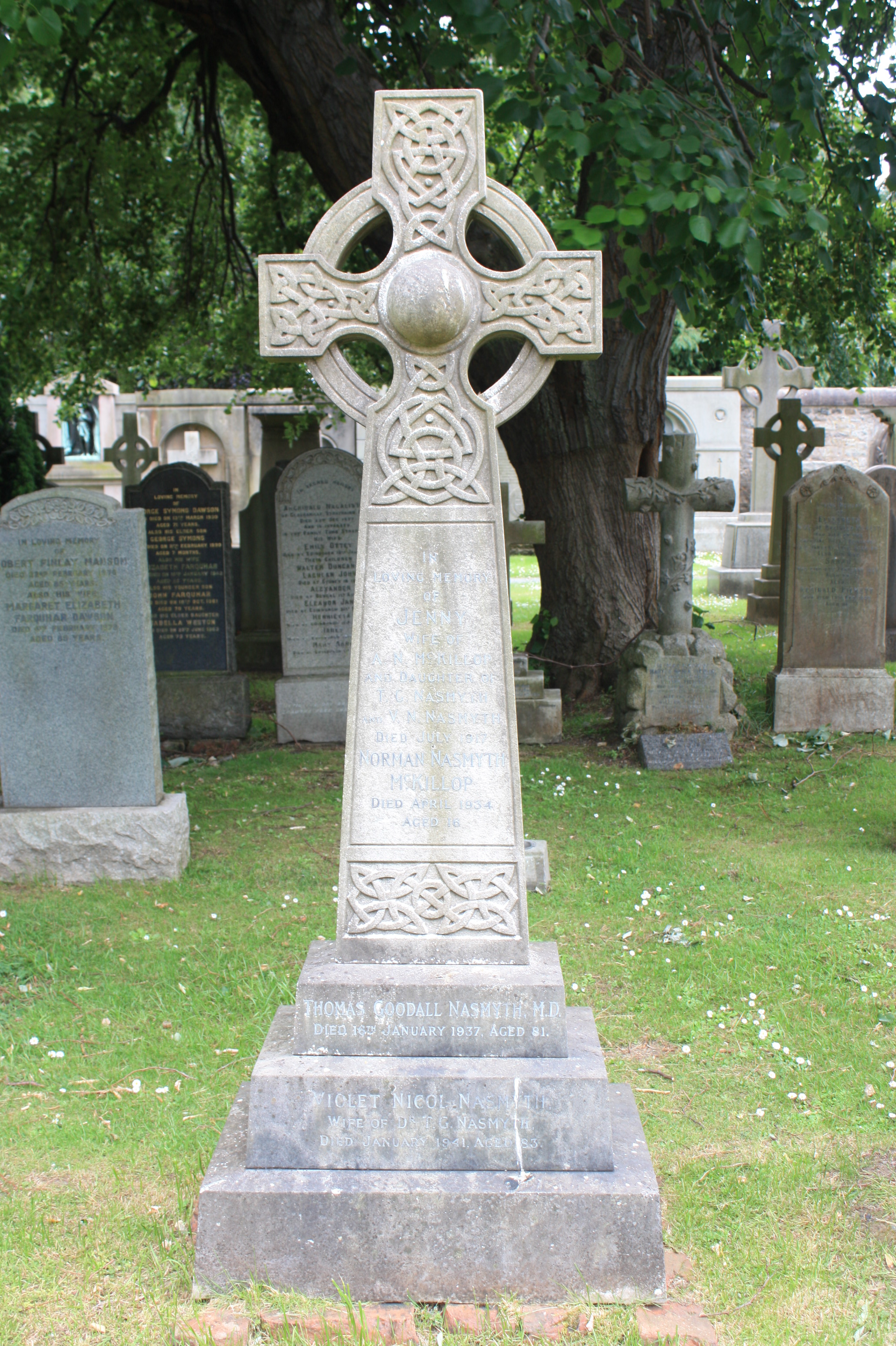
The grave of Thomas Goodall Nasmyth, Dean Cemetery, Edinburgh

He was born in Auchterderran in Fife on 28 February 1855 the son of Isabella Chisholm and her husband, James A. Nasmyth. who owned the Fife Coal Company. He graduated MB ChB from the University of Edinburgh in 1876. In 1886 he gained a Diploma in Public Health (DPH) from the University of Cambridge. He gained his DSc from the University of Edinburgh in 1887

In 1887 he was elected a Fellow of the Royal Society of Edinburgh. His proposers were Dr John Chiene, Sir Thomas Grainger Stewart, Peter Denny and Dr Kirk Duncanson. He resigned from the Society in 1908.

In 1889 he became Fife's first Medical Officer of Health and took up residence in Cupar. During World War I he oversaw medical issues at HM Factory, Gretna as the Administrative Medical Officer . Scotland's largest explosives factory. In 1900 he was elected a member of the Harveian Society of Edinburgh.

In 1916 he was living at 27 Palmerston Place in Edinburgh's West End and also noted as having property, Torrie House in Newmills, Fife. He retired to Edinburgh and died at his home, Canaan Lodge on 16 January 1937. He was cremated at Warriston Crematorium, his ashes being buried in Dean Cemetery. He was an early subscriber to the development of an Edinburgh Crematorium. The grave lies on the main east–west path of the first northern extension, slightly to the south-west of the central obelisk. He is buried with his wife and daughter Jenny McKillop (1883-1917) and Violet Nicol Nasmyth née Denny (1859-1941).

== Publications ==
- Hints about the Prevention of Consumption (1899)
- Milk-borne Diseases (1899)
- Report on Methods of Sewage Purification (1900)
- The Kingdom: Its Characteristics and Distinguished Sons (1922) – A history of Fife
- Annual Report on the Health and Sanitary Conditions of the County of Fife
- A Manual of Public Health
- The Geographical Distribution of Cancer in Scotland
- Air of Coal Mines

== Positions of Note ==
- Deputy Lieutenant of Edinburgh
- Justice of the Peace for Fife
- Director of the Fife Coal Company
- Director of the Commercial Bank of Scotland
- Director of the Highland and Agricultural Society
- Director of the Scottish National Housing Company Ltd.
- Chairman of the Royal Maternity Hospital and Simpson Maternity Hospital
- Convenor of the Deaconess Hospital Board
- Board Member for the Royal Dick Veterinary College
- Board Member of the Animal Diseases Research Association of Scotland
- President of the Scottish Branch of the Medical Officers of Health Association
- Town Councillor for Morningside, Edinburgh 1921 to 1929
- Councillor to the British Medical Association 1906 to 1910
