= David Templeman (footballer) =

Scottish footballer (born 1893)

Personal information
- Full name: David Templeman
- Date of birth: 29 September 1893
- Place of birth: Scotland
- Position: Right back

Senior career*
Years	Team	Apps	(Gls)
1913–1914	Arthurlie	20	(2)
1914–1916	Airdrieonians	3	(0)
- * Club domestic league appearances and goals

David Templeman was a Scottish professional footballer who played as a right back in the Scottish League for Arthurlie and Airdrieonians.

== Personal life ==
Templeman's brother Willie was also a footballer. Templeman served in the 63rd (Royal Naval) Division during the First World War and after being wounded a second time, he was evacuated to Britain in late 1915.

== Career statistics ==
Appearances and goals by club, season and competition
Club	Season	League			Scottish Cup		Total	
Club	Season	Division	Apps	Goals	Apps	Goals	Apps	Goals
Arthurlie	1913–14	Scottish Second Division	20	2	8	0	28	2
Airdrieonians	1914–15	Scottish First Division	1	0	―		1	0
Airdrieonians	1915–16	Scottish First Division	2	0	―		2	0
Airdrieonians	Total		3	0	―		3	0
Career total			23	2	8	0	31	2
