= Eastriggs railway station =

Former railway station in Scotland

Eastriggs
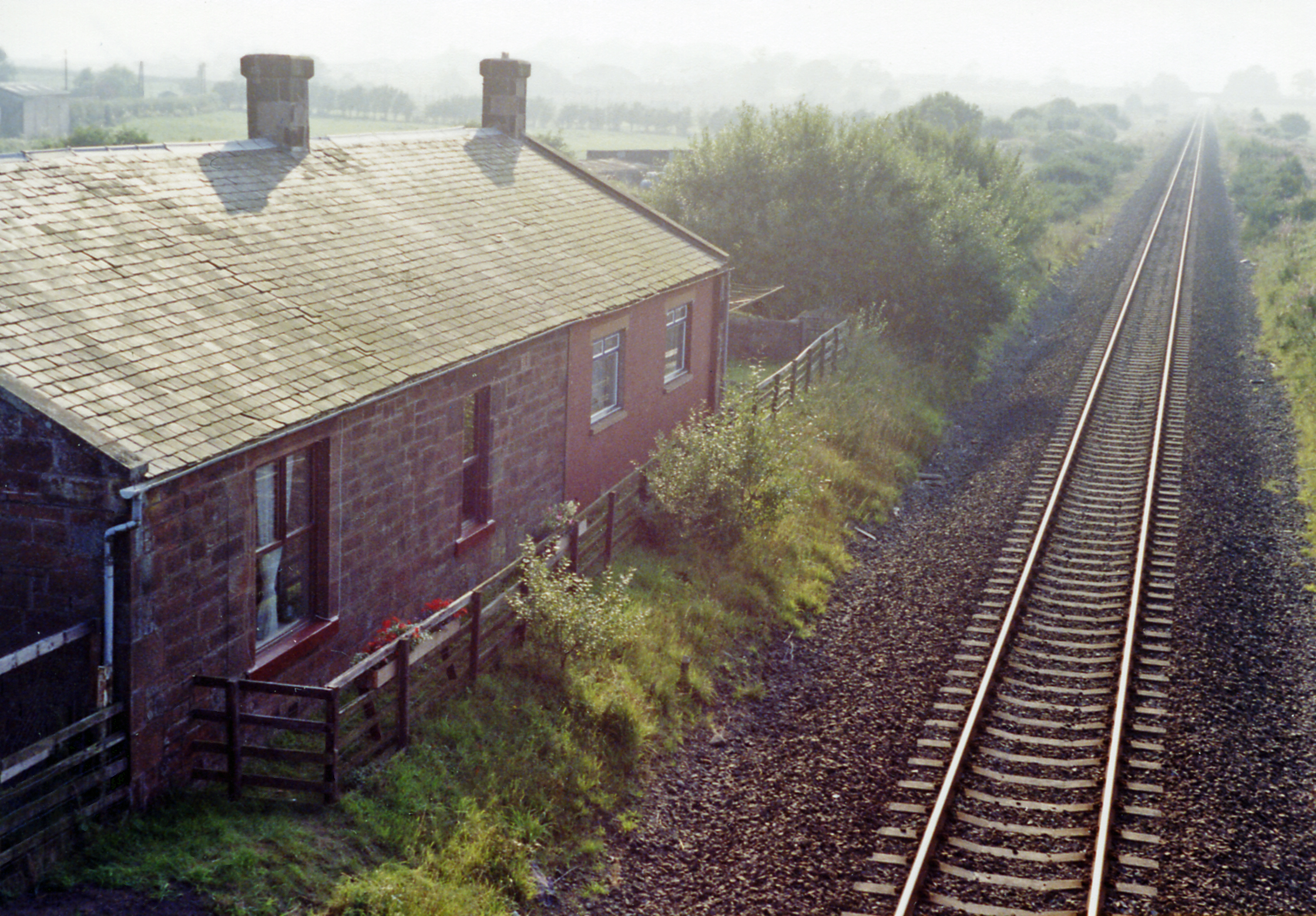
- Remains of the station in 1991

General information
- Location: Eastriggs, Dumfries and Galloway; Scotland
- Coordinates: 54.9863°N 3.1884°W
- Platforms: 2

Other information
- Status: Disused

History
- Original company: Glasgow, Dumfries and Carlisle Railway
- Pre-grouping: Glasgow and South Western Railway
- Post-grouping: LMS

Key dates
- 23 August 1848: Opened as Dornock
- October 1854: Closed
- 2 January 1865: Re-opened
- 1 May 1923: Renamed Eastriggs
- 6 December 1965: Closed
Location

Eastriggs railway station was a railway station in Dumfries and Galloway between Annan and Gretna.

Dumfries and Galloway Council are trying to find funding to reopen the station.

== History ==
The station opened 23 August 1848 as Dornock. Six years later it was closed for a period of 11 years, from October 1854 until 2 January 1865. It was renamed as Eastriggs by the London Midland and Scottish Railway on 1 May 1923.

The station closed on 6 December 1965, although the line through the station is still open.

Station buildings still exist, currently as private houses.

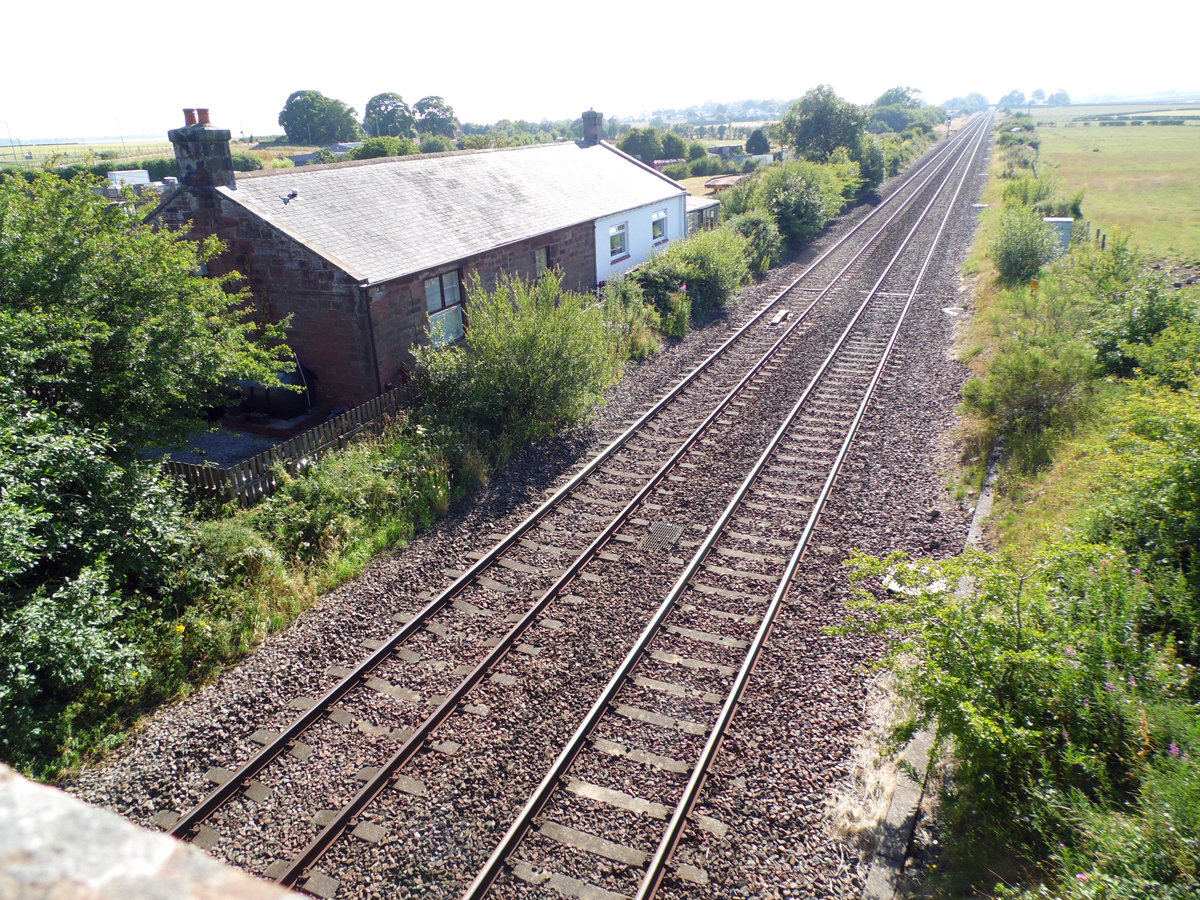
Dornock Railway Station in 2018

Reports between 2022 and 2023 show that Transport Scotland has dismissed the plans of the Eastriggs Railway Station Action Group (ERSAG) for the re-opening of Eastriggs railway station.

Preceding station	Historical railways	Following station
Annan; Line and station open	Glasgow and South Western Railway; Glasgow, Dumfries and Carlisle Railway	Rigg; Line open; station closed
