= Munitionette =

Female munitions worker

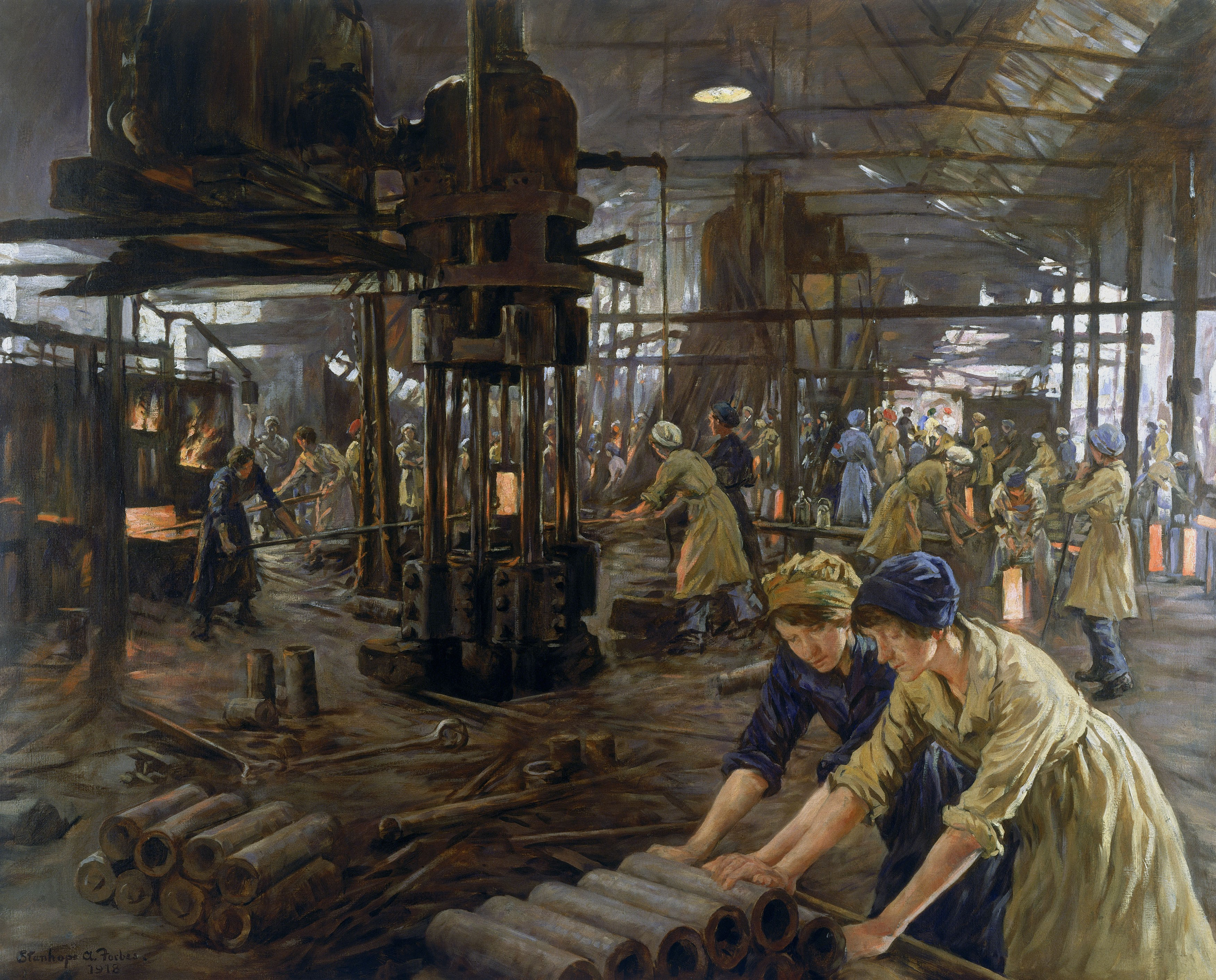
Women working as munitionettes at Kilnhurst Steelworks during the First World War. The Munitions Girls painted by Stanhope Forbes, 1918.

Munitionettes were British women employed in munitions factories during the time of the First World War.

== History ==
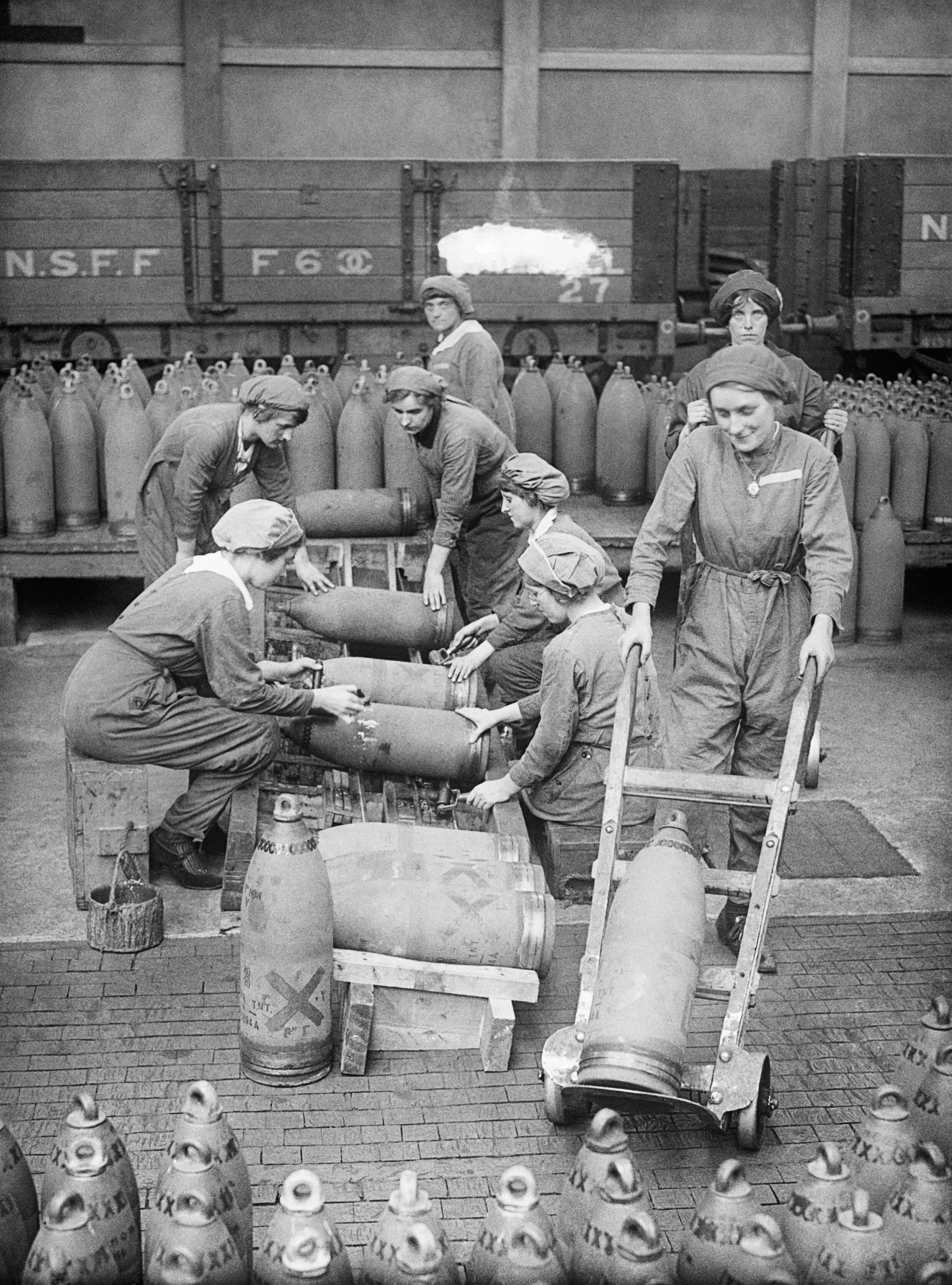
Munitionettes stencil shells at the National Filling Factory, Chilwell

Early in the war, the United Kingdom's munitions industry found itself having difficulty producing the amount of weapons and ammunition needed by the country's armed forces. In response to the crisis, known as the Shell Crisis of 1915, the British government passed the Munitions of War Act 1915 to increase government oversight and regulation of the industry.

The newly created Ministry of Munitions regulated wages, hours and employment conditions in munitions factories. It also forced the factories to admit more women as employees, because so many of the nation's men were engaged in fighting in the war and male labour was in short supply.

Historian Angela Woollacott has estimated that approximately one million women were working in munitions industries by mid 1918. She suggests that a greater number of women worked in munitions than in the Voluntary Aid Detachment, the Women's Land Army or other such organisations.

Historian Deborah Thom suggests that many workers had previous experience of factory work, though few had made munitions. But the specific type of the work was considered different: historian Patrica Fara notes that 90% of women who went into engineering trades entered domains not previously regarded as suitable for women, and most of these were employed in munitions works manufacturing cordite and TNT.

Some large firms greatly increased their workforce during the war: the number of employees at Birmingham Small Arms' (BSA) increased from 3,500 to 13,000 and at Austin in Longbridge from 2,800 in 1914 to 20,000 in 1918, many of these extra workers were women.

Some women entering munitions work did so seeking better pay and fewer working hours than were customary in domestic service, pubs and laundries. Employers in these industries complained about losing their staff to munitions factories. The national munitions factory in Gretna, which was the largest industrial site in the world at the time, recorded that 36% of its workers had previously been in domestic service. The Gretna Girls was a collective nickname given to women munition workers at HM Factory Gretna in World War One.

By June 1917, roughly 80% of the weaponry and ammunition used by the British army during World War I was being made by munitionettes.

== Working conditions ==
Conditions varied from factory to factory. At Gretna, the staff was mostly women, who worked in 12-hour shifts and lived in huts with their beds shared with someone on the opposite shift to minimise accommodation costs. The Health of Munitions Workers Committee reported that "women have accepted conditions of work which if continued must ultimately be disastrous to health".

In an article written in 1916 after a visit to HM Factory Gretna, Rebecca West wrote "Surely, never before in modern history can women have lived a life so parallel to that of the regular army. The girls who take up this work sacrifice almost as much as the men who enlist...it is a barrack life."

=== TNT poisoning ===
Munitionettes worked with hazardous chemicals on a daily basis without adequate protection. Many women worked with trinitrotoluene (TNT). Prolonged exposure to the nitric acid used in the process turned worker's skin yellow, prompting the popular name canary girls. Exposure to chemicals was also a serious health risk for the munitionettes. Prolonged exposure to chemicals such as TNT can cause severe harm to the immune system. People exposed to TNT can experience liver failure, anemia, and spleen enlargement, and TNT can affect women's fertility. Some side effects commonly included breast and lower region enlargement.

=== Explosions ===
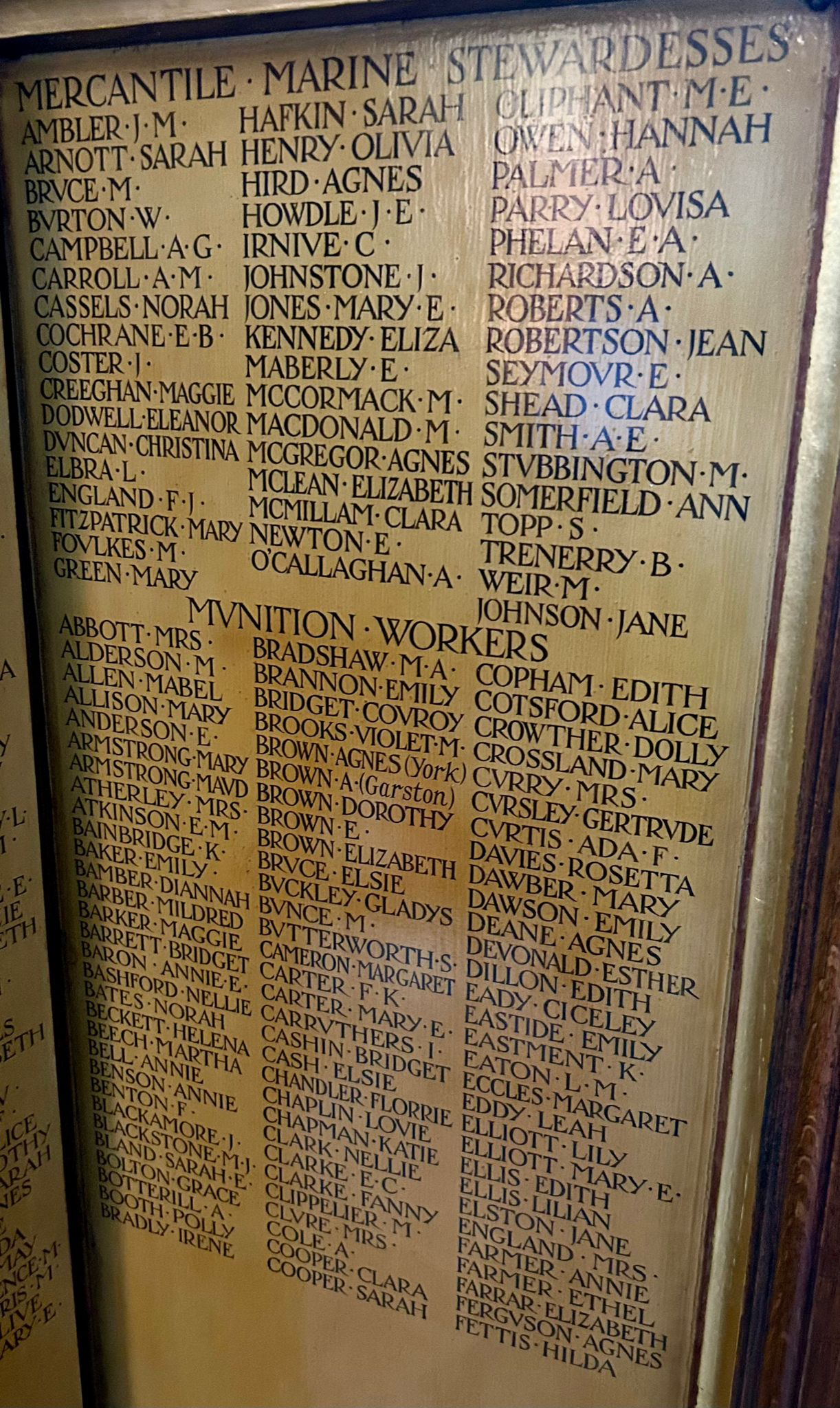
Oak panel from York Minster's Five Sisters window listing female munitions workers that died in WWI

Munitions workers faced risk of explosion due to the nature of the materials they handled. On several occasions, the explosives the women were working with ignited and injured or killed the workers. Explosions at British munitions factories during World War I included the 1916 Barnbow explosion in which 35 women died, the 1917 Silvertown explosion, in which 73 people were killed and over 400 injured, and a 1918 explosion at the National Shell Filling Factory, Chilwell, which killed over 130 workers.

In 1925 the Five Sisters window at York Minster was rededicated to the 1,513 women who died in the line of service during WWI, including the munitionettes.

=== Wages ===
There were no standard rates of pay for women when the war began, and food prices rose by a third in the year to July 1915, leaving women munitions workers that were on minimum rates earning below the level of a living wage. Rates of pay varied significantly at different factories and, until 1917, women were prevented from leaving one firm to move to another that would pay them better because they had to obtain a certificate from their previous employer stating that they had left with their employer's consent. Arbitration to enforce the Fair Wages Clause was too slow to solve the problem of women munition workers' wages.

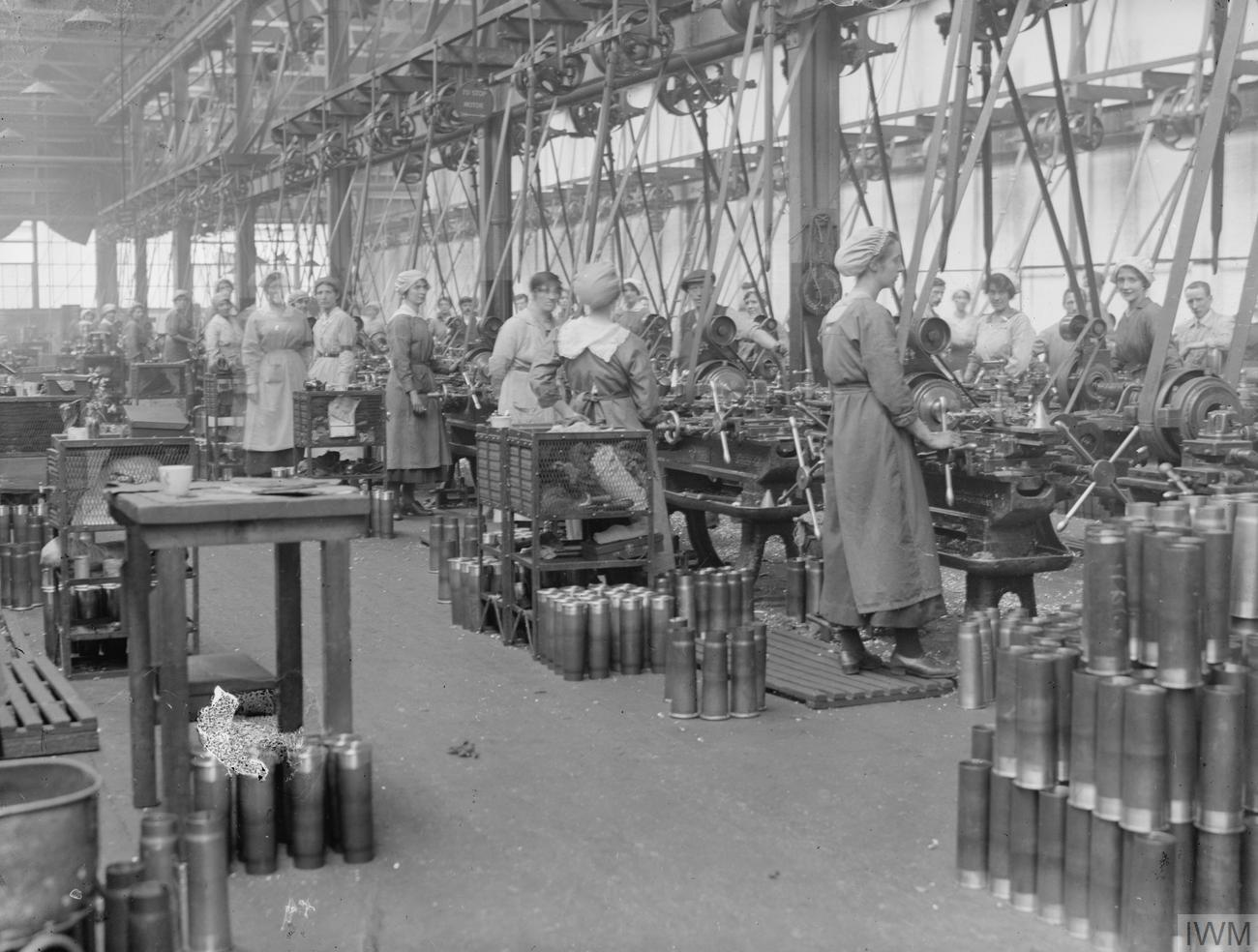
Munitionettes machining shell cases in the New Gun Factory, Woolwich Arsenal, London

The Munitions of War Act of July 1915 declared that the admission of 'semi-skilled or female labour shall not affect adversely the rates customarily paid for the job' or reduce the rates a man could be expected to pay. There was not an official statement as to what constituted "men's" work versus "women's" but in October, suggestions were made as to what women doing "men's" work should be paid. An amendment in January 1916 stated that the Minister of Munitions had the power to give directions as to the rate of wages of female workers, and introduced compulsory arbitration for disagreements between women workers and their employers. In the August 1917 Act, the certificate regulations preventing women from leaving factories without their employers' permission to earn higher wages elsewhere were repealed.

Munitions workers presented an unusual case in the history of equal employment. The Ministry of Munitions approach to the principle "equal pay for equal work" was that:

Equality of pay for equal work is normally established by the fixing of new rates after the introduction of women, which are either so high as to make the continued employment of women at them uneconomical to the employer, or so low as to render the occupation unattractive to men.

In other words, employers chose not to employ women and pay them equally because they could employ men instead, or they employed so many women that men did not want the occupation and therefore there were no high men's wages to benchmark against, enabling employers to pay women relatively little for the work. However, munitions factories were in the position of having mostly women workers, but still enough men and recent memories of their wages against which to benchmark. Moreover, the Ministry of Munitions had pledged not to devalue men's work by paying lower rates whilst they were temporarily away at war in the 1915 Act. Men's unions had an interest in holding the Ministry to its promise, and unions that represented women campaigned for equality. Unions demanded "equal pay at men's rates" specifically rather than "equal pay for equal work".

Employers and the Ministry argued that "it was not considered that one woman was the equivalent of one man", and that women needed more supervision and required new amenities. They also argued for differences between piece work and work paid based on time, suggesting that it was acceptable to pay equally per piece produced, but that they assumed that a woman might accomplish less in the same amount of time than a man so were reluctant to provide equal pay for time work. Unions also demanded equal war advances and bonuses for women on men's work. This demand was refused by the Ministry of Munitions on the principle that it would have been very expensive for the State and also that it would have been "unfair" to women working in new industries that men had not previously worked in and set expectations.

At the end of the war, "out of work" payments were only given to women who could prove that they had worked before the war. Others were expected to return to their homes or to domestic service.

=== Concerns about morality ===
In Birmingham, there were accusations of drunkenness and poor morality caused by the perceived high wages. The Central Control Board, with the agreement of the Minister of Munitions, appointed a committee of enquiry. A report was published in June 1916, which concluded that "the majority of working women are making good use of their incomes" and "were doing well by their children, their homes, and their absent husbands". A suggested remedy was to have shorter opening hours for public-houses, women police, regulation of night working and regulation of the hours worked by girls under 18.

=== Supervisors ===
Ninety percent of the approximately 1000 Women's Police Volunteers trained from 1914 were employed in munitions factories as supervisors to women workers. They were paid a weekly wage, whereas other volunteers were unpaid.

=== Culture and sport ===
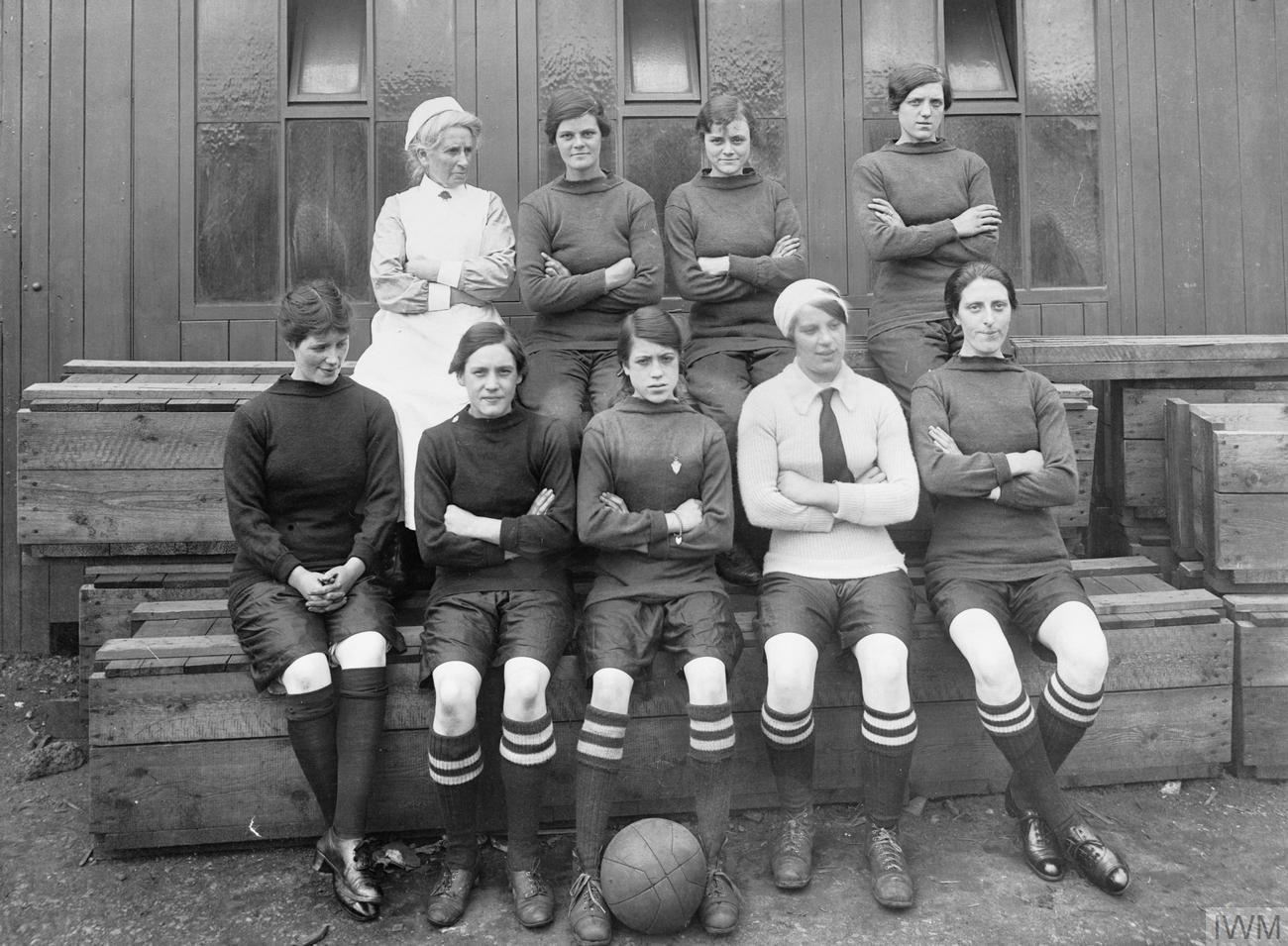
A women's football (soccer) team, the "Palmers Munitionettes"

Activities such as social clubs, theatrical societies, bands and debating groups were formed in munitions factories, and piano music and singing were especially popular. Such activities were often formed by workers and encouraged by welfare supervisors looking to increase morale and productivity.

During the war, women's football was popular with munitionettes and the general public. The Munitionettes' Cup was a famous competition in north east England in 1917–18 held between women's football teams from various munitions and other factories. Matches attracted thousands of spectators and the leading players, such as Bella Raey, became famous. Some factories' managements appear to have considered their staff participating in football a "necessary evil" that contributed to productivity and discipline amongst women 'displaced from their traditional gender roles'.

== Legacy ==
=== Women in industry ===
Because large numbers of women were employed in munitions work during the war, the conditions of their employment had an impact on women after the war ended. Thom notes that the history of women's work in munitions factories is 'influentially mythical in creating a story of women's work which has emphasised women's secondary wage earning, vulnerability to male hostility and reliance upon government rather than their own organisations for improvement.'

In November 1917, Churchill, who was the Minister of Munitions at the time, announced to women trade unionists that:

We are incomparably the greatest employers of women there has ever been in the world, we are the pioneers of women's employment in the industrial and even the military field. Whatever may be the future position which women's labour will take after the war, it will be enormously influenced by the actual practice which has been followed when so much in the making, and when so much control is vested in the organisation of the Ministry of Munitions... Now is the time during the Great War for us to perceive, discover and proclaim the principles which should regulate, for perhaps the lifetime of a whole generation and perhaps for longer, the lines of advance on which women's industrial work should proceed.

The precedent set was that women could be paid less than men and that they should resume their domestic roles to make way for the men returning from the front line. In the 1922 official history of women in munitions work and their wages, the government justified this by claiming that whereas "the man's wage is a "family" wage, the woman's is an "individual" wage" and by arguing that women did not unionise and fight for their rights and were therefore responsible for establishing the two standards.

Women's contribution to the war effort showcased their capabilities, however, and has been credited with changing the way that women were regarded in society and adding considerable momentum to the women's suffrage movement.

=== Cultural references ===
- Pat Barker's novel Regeneration includes a group of munitionettes who recount their experiences of war work.
