= Eastriggs =

Coordinates: 54.985°N 3.176°W

- Location within Dumfries and Galloway
- Population: 1,770 (2020)
- OS grid reference: NY247662
- Council area: Dumfries and Galloway
- Lieutenancy area: Dumfries
- Country: Scotland
- Sovereign state: United Kingdom
- Post town: ANNAN
- Postcode district: DG12
- Dialling code: 01461
- Police: Scotland
- Fire: Scottish
- Ambulance: Scottish
- UK Parliament: Dumfries and Galloway
- Scottish Parliament: Dumfriesshire

Eastriggs is a small village located in Dumfries and Galloway in the south of Scotland, the village is located around 2 mi (3.2 km) north of the mud and sandbanks of the channel of the River Eden, which extends west into the Solway Firth.

Travelling by road Eastriggs is 3 miles (5 kilometres) to the east of Annan, 19 miles (31 kilometres) to the east of Dumfries, 5 miles (8 kilometres) to the west of Gretna, 17.7 miles (28 kilometres) to the west of Carlisle and 83.1 miles (134 kilometres) to the south of Edinburgh.

The B721 road, runs through Eastriggs and other neighbouring towns and villages connecting to the nearby A75.

== History ==
Situated in the parish of Dornock, in the traditional county of Dumfriesshire, Eastriggs appears to have taken its name from the farm, or farm house, known as Eastriggs that was located in the middle of what was to become the new township. The only other buildings in the area prior to World War I were a group of houses at Lowtherton (now North Road, Lowthertown); a parallel group on what is now the B721 road; an inn and a smithy where East Road joins the B721.

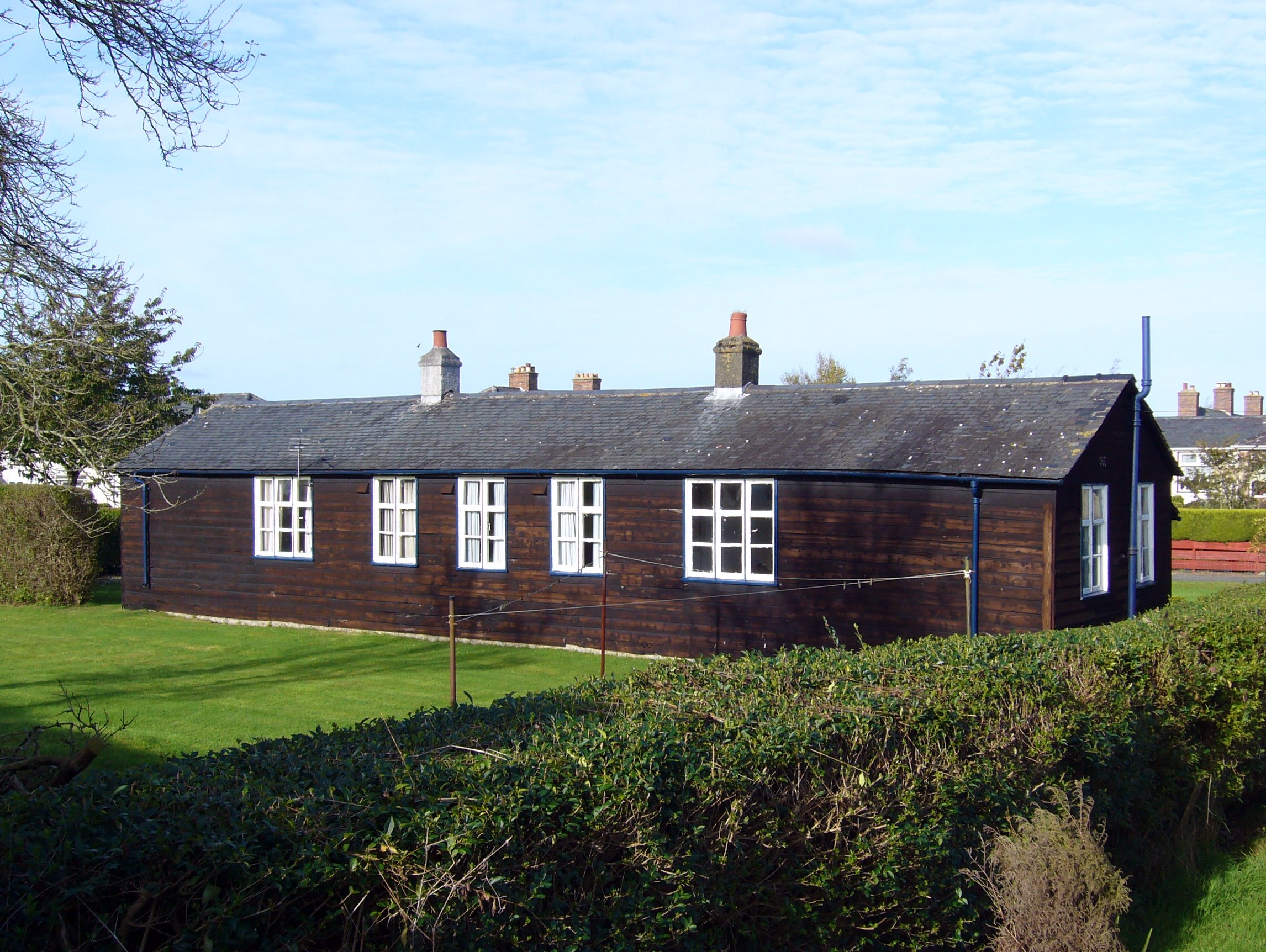
Wooden house in Eastriggs (demolished in March 2010)

The township of Eastriggs was created as a result of the shell and ammunition crisis of June 1915 which prompted the newly founded Ministry of Munitions to create a new cordite factory.

Officially designated H.M. Factory Gretna, the factory was spread over a 9-mile (14 km) site stretching from Dornock through Gretna to Longtown, Cumbria. This required a huge influx of labour, and 30,000 men and women came from all over the British Commonwealth to serve as construction and factory workers. The Devil's Porridge Museum, opened in 2014 in the village, commemorates the factory and its workers.

Sir Raymond Unwin, Chief Housing Architect of the housing branch of the Explosives Department of Ministry of Munitions, and Courtenay Crickmer designed wooden housing for the workers in both Eastriggs and Gretna. As a mark of respect for the immigrant workforce, the streets were named after various cities within the Commonwealth.

== Governance ==
Eastriggs is in the parliamentary constituency of Dumfriesshire, Clydesdale and Tweeddale, David Mundell, the Conservative Party member of parliament has held the seat since 2005.

It is part of the South Scotland region in the Scottish Parliament, being in the constituency of Dumfriesshire. Oliver Mundell of the Conservatives is the MSP.

Prior to Brexit, for the European Parliament its residents voted to elect MEP's for the Scotland constituency.

== Church of St John the Evangelist ==
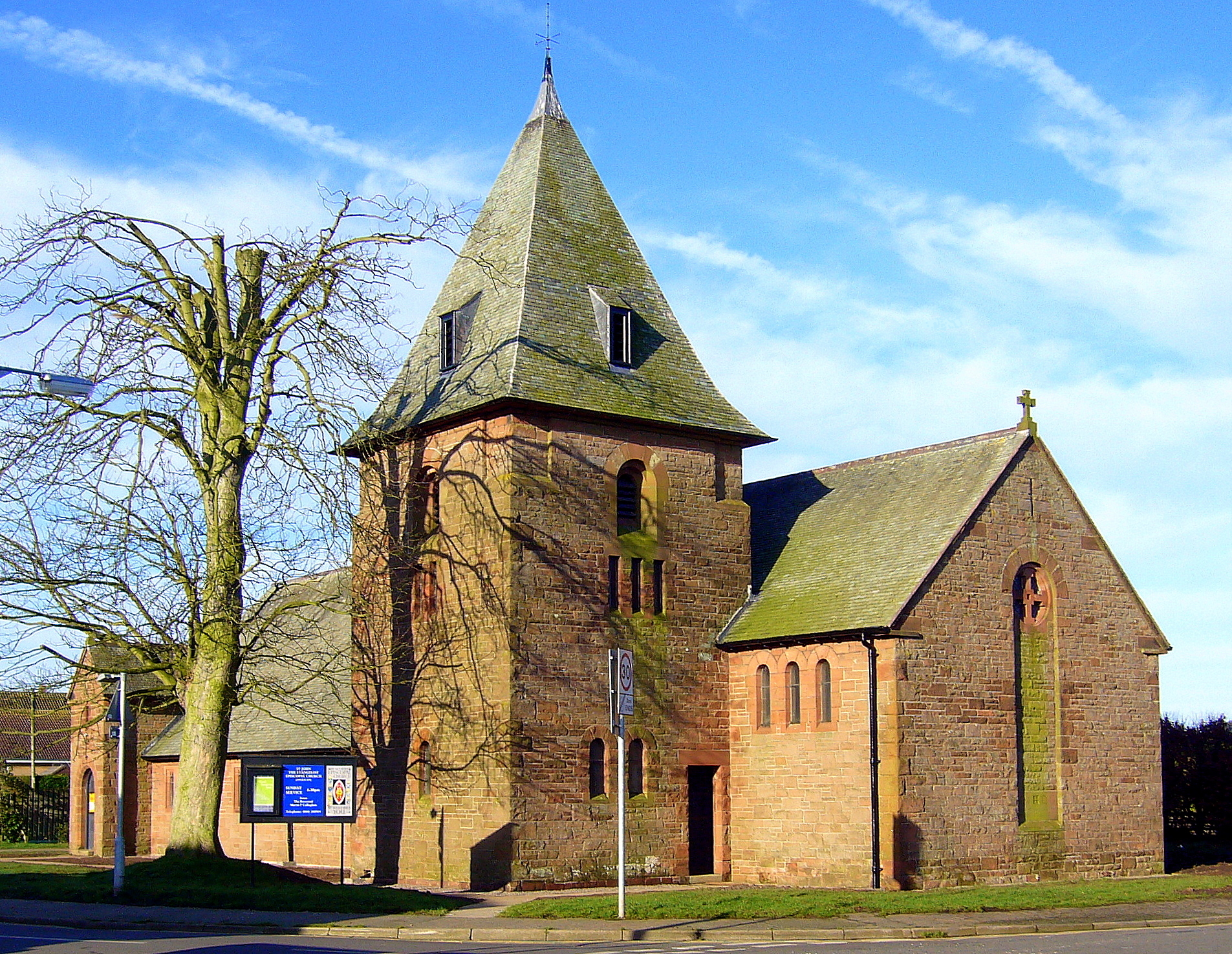
Church of St John the Evangelist, Eastriggs.

Designed in the Gothic style by C M Crickmer under the direction of Sir Raymond Unwin, the Church of St John the Evangelist was dedicated in 1917, and was presented with a signed altar book the following year by King George V and Queen Mary, who were paying an official visit to HM Factory, Gretna.

== Rail transport ==
The Glasgow South Western Line connecting Carlisle, Gretna Green and Annan passes through the currently closed Eastriggs railway station. The station was originally called Dornock, but renamed Eastriggs in 1923. The station closed in 1963. In 2019, Andrew Wood, then chair of the South West Scotland Transport Partnership, said that in response to a public consultation, that he believed that there would be great benefit to the local community in opening up Beattock, Thornhill and Eastriggs stations.

== Sport ==
Eastriggs F.C. are the town's amateur football team. They play in the DSAFL.

== Notes ==
- Reprinted one-inch Victorian Ordnance Survey Maps of Scotland (Sheet 6), Annan & Whithorn. 1st edition revised to 1896. Kyle of Lochalsh: Caledonian Maps. ISBN 1-85349-006-7.
- Ordnance Survey Landranger Map (number 85) - 1:50,000 scale (1.25 inches to 1 mile). ISBN 0-319-22685-9.
- Ordnance Survey Explorer Map (number 323) - 1:25,000 scale (2.5 inches to 1 mile)
- Ministry of Munitions of War, (1918). H.M. Factory, Gretna: Description of Plant and Process. Dumfries: J. Maxwell & Son for His Majesty's Stationery Office.
- Stratton, Michael and Trinder, Barrie (2000). Twentieth Century Industrial Archaeology. London: E & FN Spon. ISBN 0-419-24680-0.
- Video/DVD, (1994). The Longtown Military Railway. Carnforth: Tele Rail.

== See also ==
- Eastriggs railway station

== Gallery ==
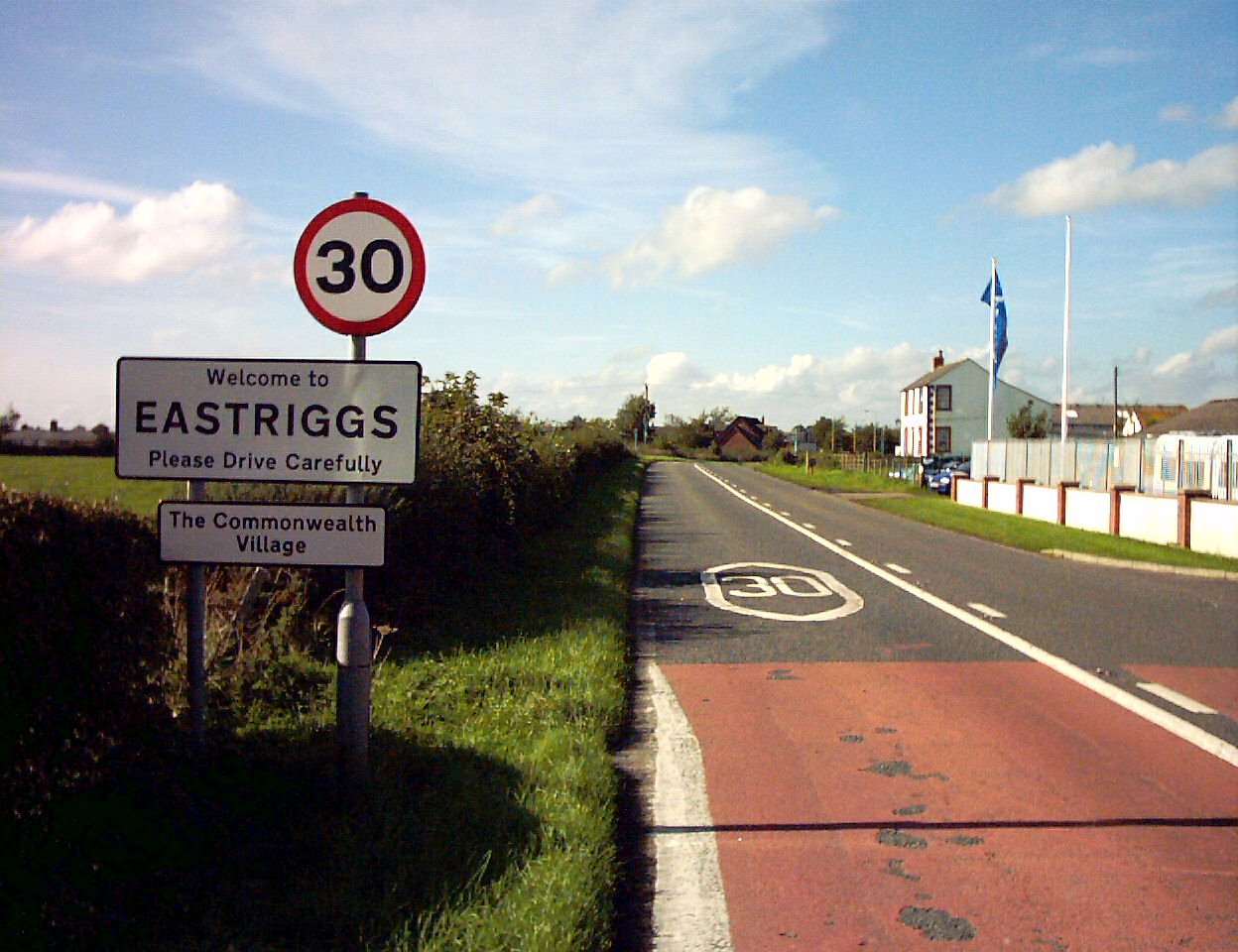
Eastriggs, The Commonwealth Village, from the east.

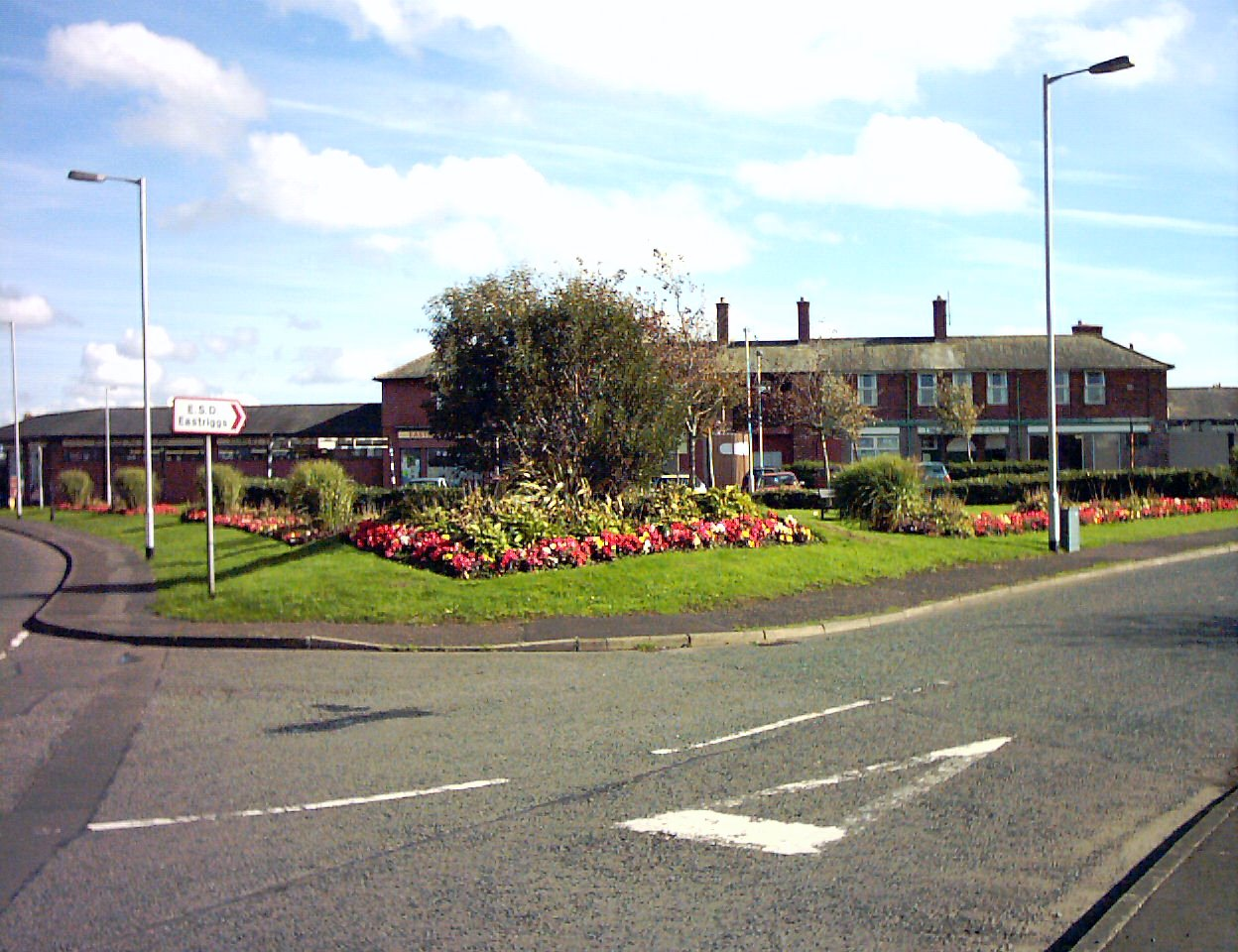
Eastriggs from the west

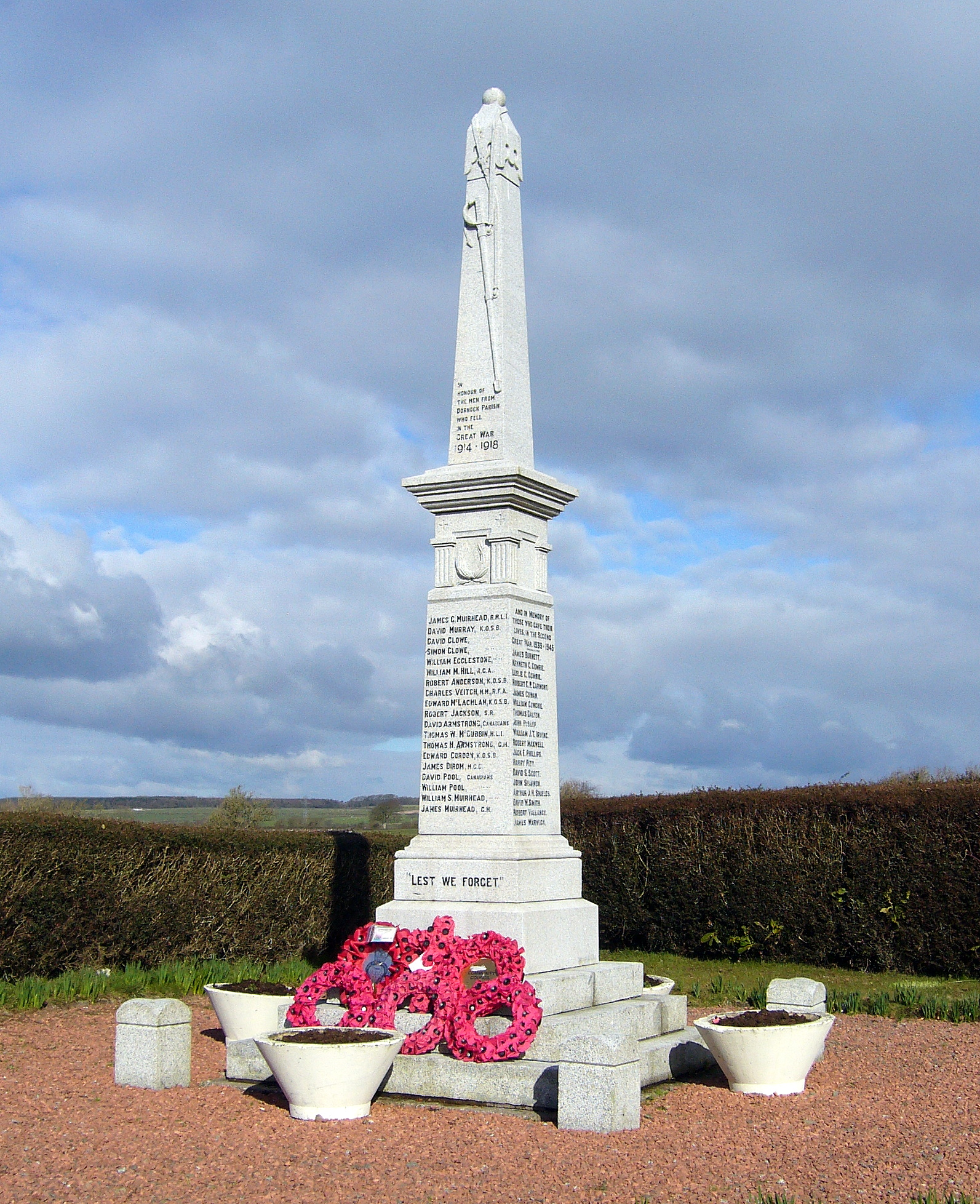
Dornock and Eastriggs war memorial

Aerial View of Eastriggs
