= William Templeman (chemist) =

British chemist and solicitor

Captain William Henry Templeman
- Born: 18 July 1883; Myton, Hull, England
- Died: 11 March 1919 (aged 35)
- Employer(s): HM Factory, Gretna; HM Factory, Queensferry; Waltham Abbey Royal Gunpowder Mills

Captain William Henry Templeman (18 July 1883 - 11 March 1919) was an English chemist and munitions expert, army officer and solicitor in England and lawyer and patent agent in Australia.

== Life ==
Templeman was the son of William Henry Templeman and Margaret Ann Templeman (née Fairweather), born on 18 July 1883 at Kingston upon Hull. His father was a grocer's manager and at the time of his birth, the family lived at 59 Spring Street, Myton, Hull.

He was educated at Day Street National School; Hymers College, Hull Technical School, and University College London. The census for 31 March 1901 shows he was at home, at Park Street, Hull, with his parents, his two brothers, Arthur and Thomas S; maid, Minnie M; and a visitor of private means, a widow, Emily Magson, aged 45.

In 1901, Templeman passed Intermediate BSc, University of London. He first studied for Part I of the Natural Sciences Tripos at St John's College, Cambridge in 1902 having been admitted on 22 February 1902. In 1907, he won the McMahon Law Scholarship (£150 for 4 years). He graduated with LLB on 23 June 1908 and was approved for LLM on 13 March 1915, on the strength of a dissertation entitled ‘Equitable assignments’.

The census for 2 April 1911 shows him at home at Fountain Street, Hull, with his parents, aunt, Isabella Cuthbertson; cousin, Elizabeth Morris Cuthbertson; and a maid, Ruby Elizabeth Wallace. William's occupation is a solicitor on his own account. He was elected a member of Hull Incorporated Law Society on 21 April 1911.

In 1914, he was employed by the Department of Explosives Supply, Ministry of Munitions, and he worked at Waltham Abbey Royal Gunpowder Mills; HM Factory, Queensferry; and later at HM Factory, Gretna.

He was at one time, resident in Tasmania (his brother, Arthur, lived in Burnie), from which he joined the First Australian Imperial Force.

On 8 July 1915, he was admitted as a practitioner to the Supreme Court of Tasmania, intending to practice as both a lawyer and a patent agent; having practiced as a solicitor in England for four years, but in December 1915, he returned to England.

In September 1916, he was appointed Subsection Manager of the Cordite Section at HM Factory, Gretna, where he was in charge of 25 chemists, more than 2,000 other staff and a lot of equipment.

In May, 1917, he moved to the Royal Army Ordnance Corps for duties connected with inspection of ammunition. On 18 August 1917, the Gazette confirmed his rank as 2nd lieutenant, Army Ordnance Department and to be a temporary lieutenant. He was promoted to acting captain on 17 September 1917 .

In late 1918, he was elected an Associate of the Royal Institute of Chemistry when he was an Inspecting Ordnance Officer. He was also a Fellow of the Chemical Society and a member of the Society of Chemical Industry.

In January 1919, he joined Tonbridge School as an instructor in chemistry and biology. His rank of acting captain was relinquished on 8 February 1919. He died at Tonbridge, Kent, England on 11 March 1919 due to pneumonic influenza.
