= Willie Templeman =

Scottish footballer

Personal information
- Full name: William Templeman
- Place of birth: Scotland
- Position: Outside right

Senior career*
Years	Team	Apps	(Gls)
1911–1915	Airdrieonians	105	(17)
- * Club domestic league appearances and goals

William Templeman was a Scottish professional footballer who played in the Scottish League for Airdrieonians.

== Personal life ==
Templeman's brother David was also a footballer. Templeman served in the British Armed Forces during the First World War.

== Career statistics ==
Appearances and goals by club, season and competition
Club	Season	League			Scottish Cup		Total	
Club	Season	Division	Apps	Goals	Apps	Goals	Apps	Goals
Airdrieonians	1911–12	Scottish First Division	26	4	2	2	28	6
Airdrieonians	1912–13	Scottish First Division	32	9	2	0	34	9
Airdrieonians	1913–14	Scottish First Division	32	4	3	0	35	4
Airdrieonians	1914–15	Scottish First Division	14	0	―		14	0
Airdrieonians	1915–16	Scottish First Division	1	0	―		1	0
Career total			105	17	7	2	112	19
