= Courtenay Crickmer =

English architect

Courtenay Melville Crickmer (1879–1971) was an English architect who was closely associated with the development of Letchworth Garden City and Hampstead Garden Suburb. He was born at St Pancras, London, and educated at Highgate School. He designed many buildings at Letchworth and around 70 houses at Hampstead Garden Suburb. He was site architect at Gretna, Dumfries.
