= Bishopton railway station =

Railway station in Renfrewshire, Scotland

Bishopton Scottish Gaelic: Baile an Easbaig
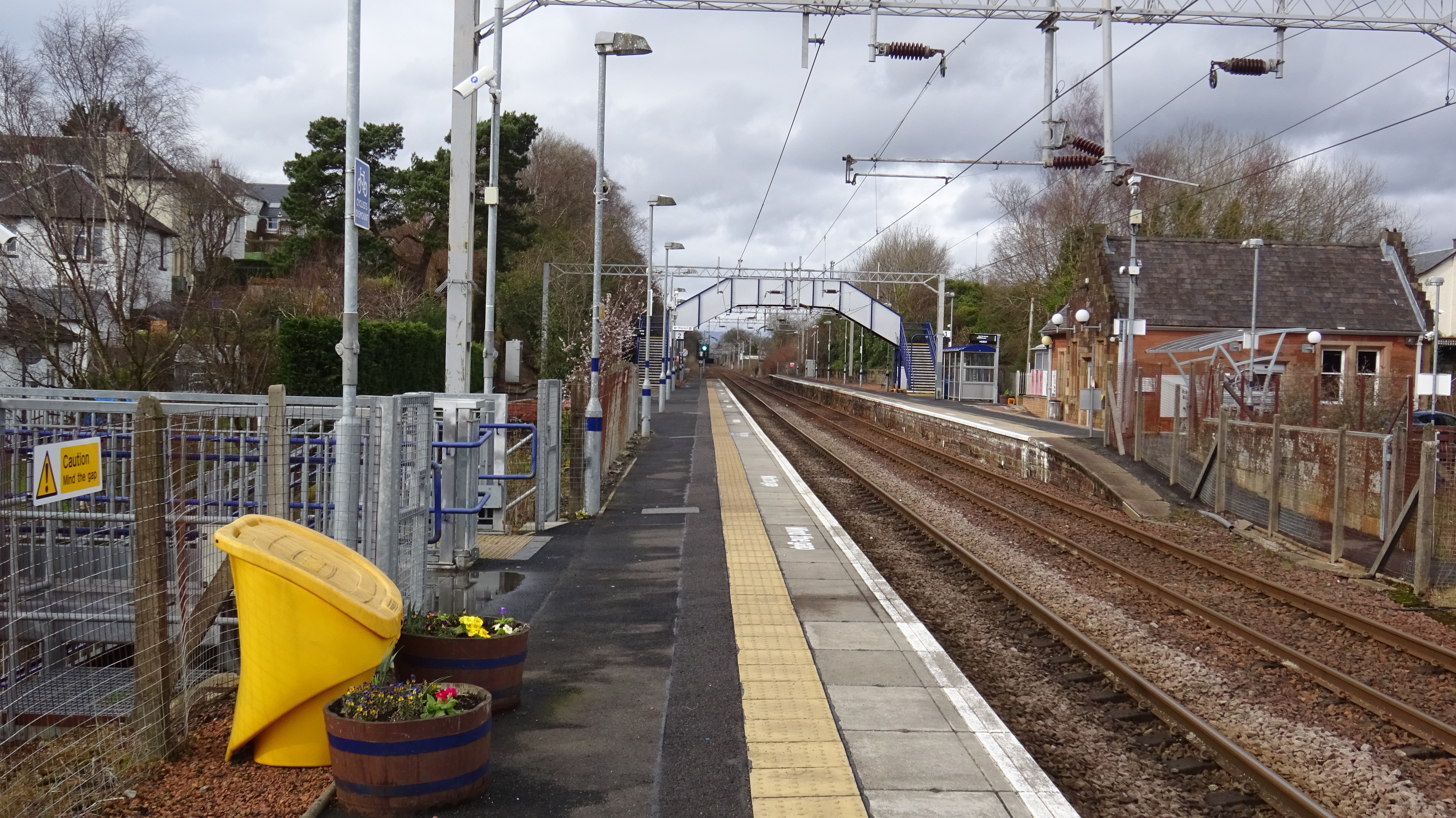
- View towards Gourock

General information
- Location: Bishopton, Renfrewshire; Scotland
- Coordinates: 55.9024°N 4.5009°W
- Grid reference: NS437705
- Owner: Network Rail
- Manager: ScotRail
- Transit authority: SPT
- Platforms: 2

Other information
- Station code: BPT
- Fare zone: 6

Key dates
- 29 March 1841: Opened
- World War II: Lengthened platforms for ROF Bishopton

Passengers
- 2021/22: ▲0.403 million
- 2022/23: ▲0.552 million
- 2023/24: ▲0.671 million
- 2024/25: ▲0.702 million
- 2025/26: ▲0.737 million
Location
Notes
- Passenger statistics from the Office of Rail and Road

Bishopton railway station serves the village of Bishopton in Renfrewshire, Scotland. The station is on the Inverclyde line, 13 miles (21 km) west of Glasgow Central. It opened on 29 March 1841. The station is managed by ScotRail.

== Services ==
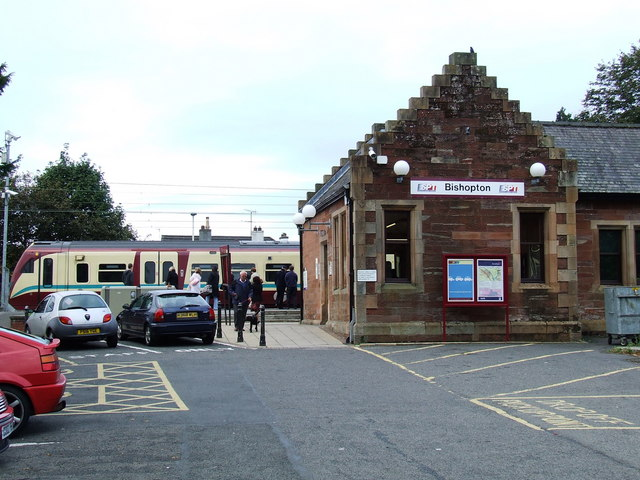
Bishopton station viewed from Station Road. The train is bound for Glasgow Central.

Bishopton is served by five services per hour (off-peak, Mon-Sat): four to/from Gourock, and one to/from Wemyss Bay with five per hour in the other direction to and from Glasgow Central (three limited stop expresses and two all stops locals). Evenings see a halving of services to Gourock and a reduction to 3tph to Glasgow.

On Sundays there are two trains per hour to Glasgow Central and hourly services to both Wemyss Bay and Gourock. The rolling stock used is predominantly Class 318 EMUs, Class 320 EMUs, Class 380 EMUs and Class 385 EMUs.

Preceding station	National Rail	Following station
Langbank or Port Glasgow	ScotRail; Inverclyde Line	Paisley St James or Paisley Gilmour Street
	Historical railways	
Langbank	Caledonian Railway; Glasgow, Paisley and Greenock Railway	Georgetown; Line open; station closed

== ROF sidings ==
There was a standard-gauge link from the ROF railway line to the Inverclyde line. The factory had transfer sidings connected to both the up and down lines. The ROF line which was never electrified ran on to the transfer sidings a few yards west from the Bishopton station. It crossed Ingleston Road via a gated level crossing entering the ROF site from the north. The link remained in-situ right up until closure of the factory but was little used after the early 1990s. The sidings were removed in 2011.

== Accident ==
A passenger train from Glasgow to Greenock was leaving the station on the morning of 16 January 1855. A mineral train travelling on the other line in the opposite direction approached and as the trains passed each other, trucks at the rear of the mineral train left the rails. They fell on the up line as the passenger train was coming. This resulted in the passenger train stopping quickly. Nobody was killed, however twelve mineral wagons were damaged.

== Sources ==
- Butt, R. V. J. (October 1995). The Directory of Railway Stations: details every public and private passenger station, halt, platform and stopping place, past and present (1st ed.). Sparkford: Patrick Stephens Ltd. ISBN 978-1-85260-508-7. OCLC 60251199. OL 11956311M.
- Jowett, Alan (March 1989). Jowett's Railway Atlas of Great Britain and Ireland: From Pre-Grouping to the Present Day (1st ed.). Sparkford: Patrick Stephens Ltd. ISBN 978-1-85260-086-0. OCLC 22311137.
