= Paisley St James railway station =

Railway station in Renfrewshire, Scotland

Paisley Saint James Scottish Gaelic: Eaglais Sheumais Phàislig
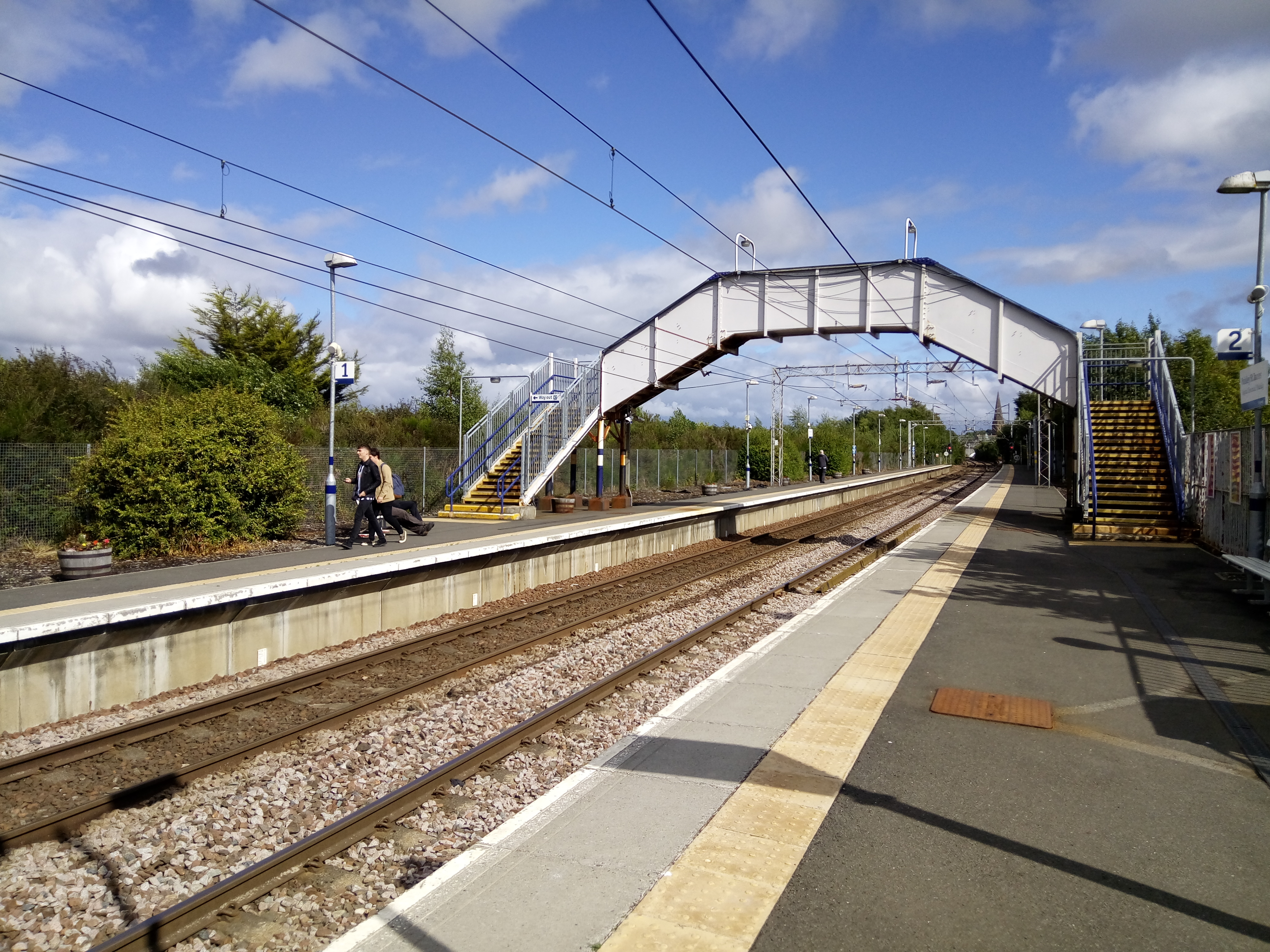
- Paisley St James in 2018. St James' Church can be seen in the distance under the footbridge.

General information
- Location: Paisley, Renfrewshire; Scotland
- Coordinates: 55.8519°N 4.4419°W
- Grid reference: NS472648
- Manager: ScotRail
- Platforms: 2

Other information
- Station code: PYJ

Key dates
- 29 March 1841: Opened

Passengers
- 2021/22: ▲52,618
- 2022/23: ▲64,478
- 2023/24: ▲89,958
- 2024/25: ▲96,238
- 2025/26: ▲0.101 million
Location
Notes
- Passenger statistics from the Office of Rail and Road

Paisley St James railway station is on the Inverclyde Line, serving one of the residential districts of the town of Paisley, Renfrewshire, just west of the town centre. For passengers travelling to the commercial district, Paisley Gilmour Street is the main railway station of Paisley and is located in the heart of Paisley town centre. There is an ongoing campaign to rename the station "Paisley St Mirren" due to the station's proximity to St Mirren Park, home of St Mirren F.C.

== History ==
The station was opened on 29 March 1841 by the Glasgow, Paisley and Greenock Railway company.

== Services ==
There is a half-hourly service available from here Mon-Sat daytimes, westbound to Greenock Central and Gourock and eastbound to Glasgow Central. Wemyss Bay trains normally skip this station during the daytime, only calling on weekday and Saturday evenings. On Sunday, there is an hourly service each way.

Preceding station	National Rail	Following station
Bishopton	ScotRail; Inverclyde Line	Paisley Gilmour Street
	Historical railways	
Georgetown; Line open; station closed	Caledonian Railway; Glasgow, Paisley and Greenock Railway	Paisley Gilmour Street
Ferguslie; Line and station closed	Caledonian Railway; Paisley and Barrhead District Railway	Terminus

== Relocation ==
On 13 October 2016, Glasgow Airport Rail Link plans were revived with a PRT option proposed. If this plan goes ahead, then Paisley St James would be relocated to a site next to Junction 29 of the M8. A PRT to the airport is also proposed from this station.
