= Georgetown railway station (Scotland) =

Former railway station in Scotland

Coordinates: 55.8767°N 4.4738°W

Georgetown
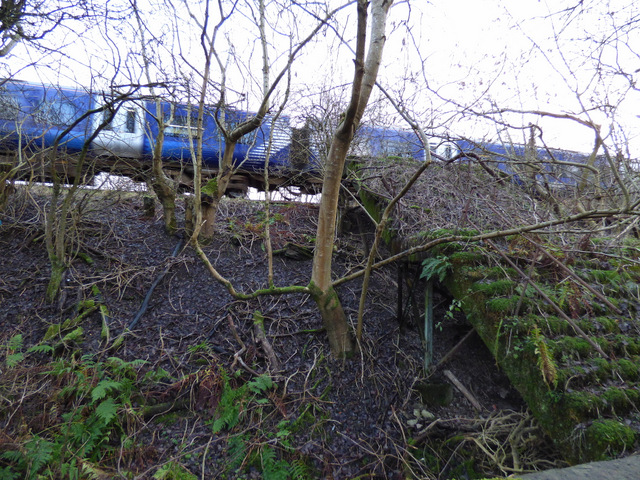
- Site of the station (2015)

General information
- Location: Houston and Killellan, Renfrewshire; Scotland
- Platforms: 2

Other information
- Status: Disused

History
- Original company: Glasgow, Paisley and Greenock Railway
- Pre-grouping: Caledonian Railway
- Post-grouping: London, Midland and Scottish Railway

Key dates
- 29 March 1841: Opened as Houston
- 1 May 1926: Renamed Georgetown
- 2 February 1959: Closed
Location

Georgetown railway station was a railway station serving the village of Houston, Renfrewshire, Scotland, originally as part of the Glasgow, Paisley and Greenock Railway and later owned by the Caledonian Railway.

It opened in March 1841 and known as was known as Houston station, after a nearby village; before being renamed as Georgetown station in May 1926. It closed in 1959.

== History ==
The station opened by the Glasgow, Paisley and Greenock Railway on 29 March 1841, as Houston station. It was located just over 3 miles, (5 kilometres) from Houston, on the Houston Road.

On 1 May 1926 it was renamed Georgetown by the London, Midland and Scottish Railway who, as a result of the 1923 Grouping, took over ownership of the line from the Caledonian Railway.

=== The private NFF station ===
There appears to have been another station of the same name located some 0.75 miles apart from the main station. The northernmost station existed for the duration of World War I, only. It was a private station built in 1915 to serve the Government-owned explosive Filling Factory, the Scottish Filling Factory (National Filling Factory No. 4), National Filling Factory, Georgetown. The factory employed over 4,600 employees in July 1916; and some 12,000 employees between December 1916 and August 1917, most of them being women. This station was linked by a covered walkway directly into the factory; which was also linked to the Caledonian Railway with interchange sidings, just north of the station. The factory was renamed the National Filling Factory, Georgetown to mark the visit on Christmas Eve 1915 of David Lloyd George, the first Minister of Munitions; he became prime minister a year later.

The factory had a township of wooden houses adjacent to both it and the public railway station. The factory closed on 11 November 1918, after the end of World War I. The private station, along with the contents of the factory, was sold in 1920.

=== Georgetown station ===
The township of Georgetown survived the closure of the National Filling Factory, although the sub-post office was closed and much of the population removed in November 1939. The last of the wooden houses became uninhabitable in the 1970s and were later demolished.

Georgetown station was closed permanently by the British Transport Commission on 2 February 1959.

== The site today ==
Nothing remains of the wooden township of Georgetown, or the public railway station.

A fragment of the concrete western platform and adjoining steps survive from the private World War I station; with a matching platform in what was to become ROF Bishopton. A number of earthworks are also visible from the train, representing the embankments of the World War I interchange sidings. They appear to have been later used by the World War II ROF Bishopton. The track and the connection to the main line appears to have been lifted during the 1967 electrification of the Inverclyde Line.

== Route ==
Preceding station	Historical railways	Following station
Bishopton	Caledonian Railway; Glasgow, Paisley and Greenock Railway	Paisley St James
