= National Filling Factory, Georgetown =

Munitions plant in Renfrewshire, Scotland

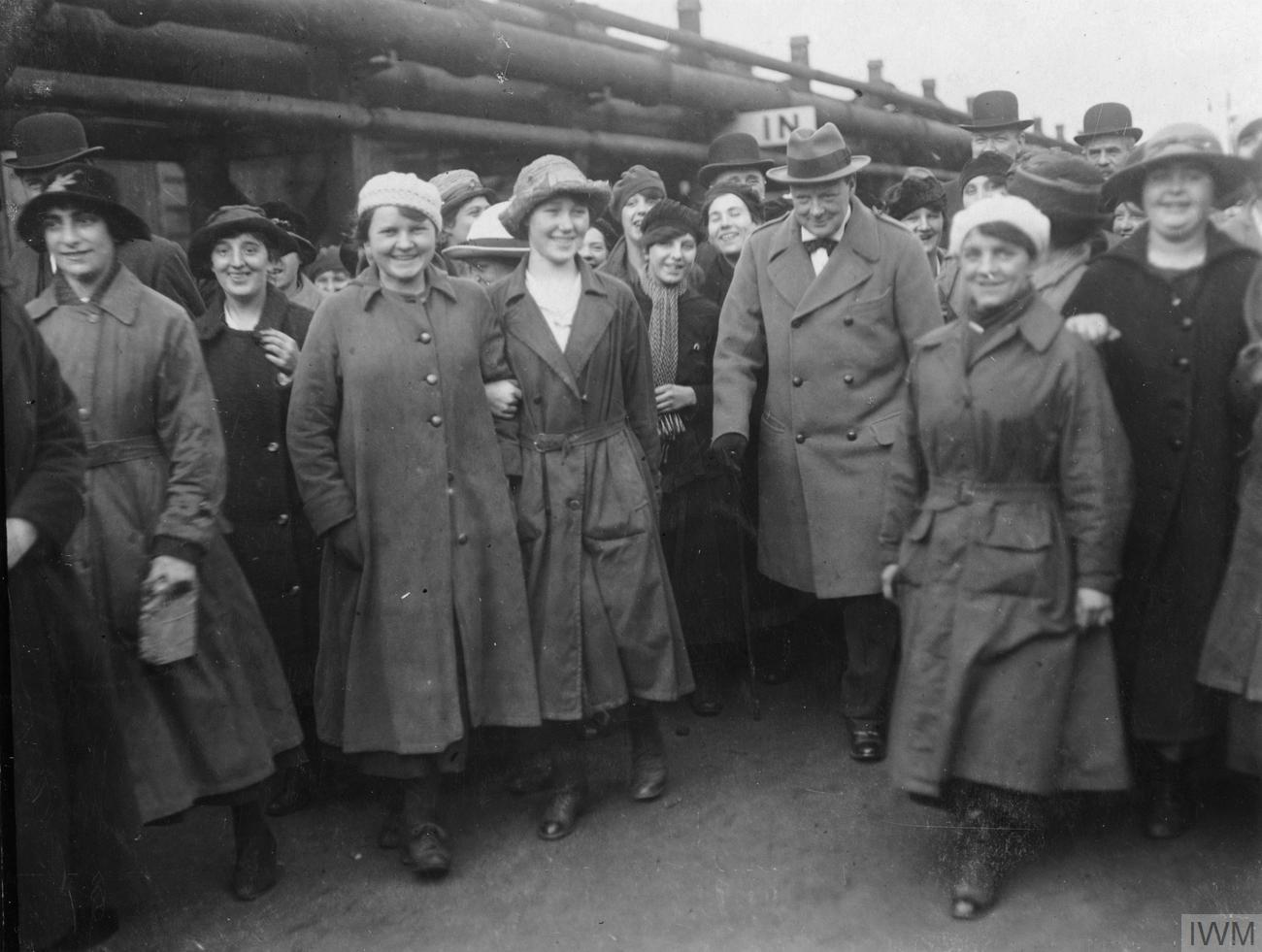
- Winston Churchill being shown around the factory by female workers on 9 October 1918
- Built: 1915
- Location: Houston, Renfrewshire, Scotland
- Industry: Defence
- Employees: 12,000
- Area: 250 acres (100 ha)
- Owner: Ministry of Munitions
- Defunct: 1919

The National Filling Factory, Georgetown, was a First World War munitions factory situated near Houston in Renfrewshire, Scotland. It is believed that the Ministry of Munitions owned up to 12 filling factories; Georgetown was known as NFF.4.

== History ==
In May 1915, David Lloyd George, who was the Minister of Munitions wanted to construct four large shell filling factories in Great Britain, because of the Shell Crisis of 1915. He arranged for William Weir, who was the Director of Munitions in Scotland, to oversee the building of such a facility. Weir selected a management board to find a suitable location for the factory.

== Location ==
A 250 acres (100 ha) site at Fulwood (near Houston) was selected. The site was chosen for being near to Glasgow, Paisley and Greenock which offered a large labour source. This meant there would not be a requirement to build new housing to accommodate workers at the factory.

An abundant water supply was required for processing at the factory. Water was required for powering machines, domestic use and fire-fighting. Given that the River Gryfe, Dargavel Burn and Paisley's civic supply were all located nearby, Fulwood provided an ideal site for the factory.

The nearby Glasgow, Paisley and Greenock Railway was also a major factor in locating the factory at Fulwood. Its line could accommodate goods being transported to and from the factory and workers commuting to the facility. The chosen site also offered over 1,000 acres (400 ha) of flat isolated land for possible expansion if required.

== Factory ==
The factory was to be responsible for assembling 40,000 items of quick-firing ammunition and 200,000 lbs of breech-load cartridges on a weekly basis. Architects were consulted to draw up plans for a factory consisting of ammunition assembly rooms and areas for the filling of cartridges. Other buildings to be constructed included workshops, a power station, offices, canteens, shifting houses, boiler house, staff accommodation and a railway station. The construction cost was estimated at £160,000.

The Sir Robert McAlpine construction company was selected to build the factory and commenced on 25 September 1915. David Lloyd George paid a visit to the factory, and at the request of the board the new factory was to be called 'Georgetown' in homage to the minister. Production at the factory began in January 1916 with 200 women assembling cartridges. By the end of June staff numbers had grown to 3,229.

As demand for munitions grew, another factory was built at the site. The new building was called factory 2. Completion of the new factory increased the area of land used to 540 acres (220 ha). Construction costs for the finished area were calculated to be £1,451,354. By June 1918 the factories employee numbers reached 11,088.

== People ==
All the National Filling Factories employed a high proportion of women workers, typically 15:1, female:male. Most also employed "Lady Superintendents", who were responsible for managing the recruitment, discipline, welfare and housing of the female staff, in what would be recognised now as a personnel or human resources role. At a large factory, such as this one, this was a very significant job, and the Lady Superintendent had a huge staff of administrators, cleaners, health workers, canteen workers and laundry workers, both male and female, under her direct control. She had, however, no supervision of the technical management of the factory. Miss D. Scott was the Lady Superintendent from January 1916, joined by an assistant superintendent, Miss Bessie M. Allan in July 1916, who later took over the Lady Superintendent role from Miss Scott. There were also four female medical doctors.

Georgetown was, in this respect, no different from the majority of the other filling factories, but it was unique in that it also had female managers on the technical side. From June 1916, Agnes Borthwick was the Works Manager of the BL Works, where Breech-Loaded cartridges were filled. She became Works Manager of No.1 Factory in July 1916, which included the filling of QF (Quick firing) cartridges. In April 1917 she took over the Works Manager post for the No.2 factory which filled shells. Her post at the No.1 factory was taken in April 1917 by Miss Jean B. Kyle and later by Miss Phoebe Duncan in May 1918.

Miss Borthwick had two assistant works managers, one of whom was a languages graduate from Somerville College, Oxford, Ethel May Kerr who began her training at Armstrong-Whitworth's in Newcastle in 1915, to become a munitions worker. After her initial training, she was sent to the Woolwich Arsenal for supervisor training to be a forewoman and in February 1916 she was appointed the Assistant Works Manager at Georgetown.

Women also became police officers and firefighters on the site.

=== Fatalities ===
Three women workers are listed as having lost their lives through an explosion at Georgetown (NFF No. 4).

Agnes Heffernan, of 116 Mclean Street, Govan, Glasgow was fatally injured due to a shell explosion at the Factory, she died as a result of her injuries aged 17 at the Victoria Infirmary in Glasgow on 26 April 1917.

Elizabeth (Lizzie) Muir Walker, of 372 Govan Street, (now Ballater Street) Gorbals, Glasgow was also fatally injured due to the shell explosion at the Factory, she died as a result of her injuries aged 19 also at the Victoria Infirmary in Glasgow on 26 April 1917.

Agnes Ferguson, of 51 Royal Street, Greenock is also listed as being killed in an explosion at the Factory.

== Railways ==
At the factory there were approximately seventeen miles of standard gauge railway tracks and fifteen miles of narrow gauge trolley tracks for internal transport. Six locomotives were available for shunting purposes and a mechanical haulage system moved specially built wagons around the factory. The six wheeled wagons were designed to carry weights of up to 1,000 pounds (450 kg) and around 1,000 were built. Georgetown railway station was used by the facility during production but closed years later.

== Post war ==
WW1 ended after the armistice was signed on 11 November 1918. During that month the factories wound down production, and Georgetown officially closed on 30 November 1918. A small number of staff were retained to clear up old stock, handle stores and other auxiliary services. It was envisaged that 3,000 new houses were to be built in the area; however, these plans never came to fruition. Some parts of the site went on to become the southern part of the Second World War munitions facility, known as Royal Ordnance Factory, Bishopton.
