= Driver's reminder appliance =

UK railway safety system

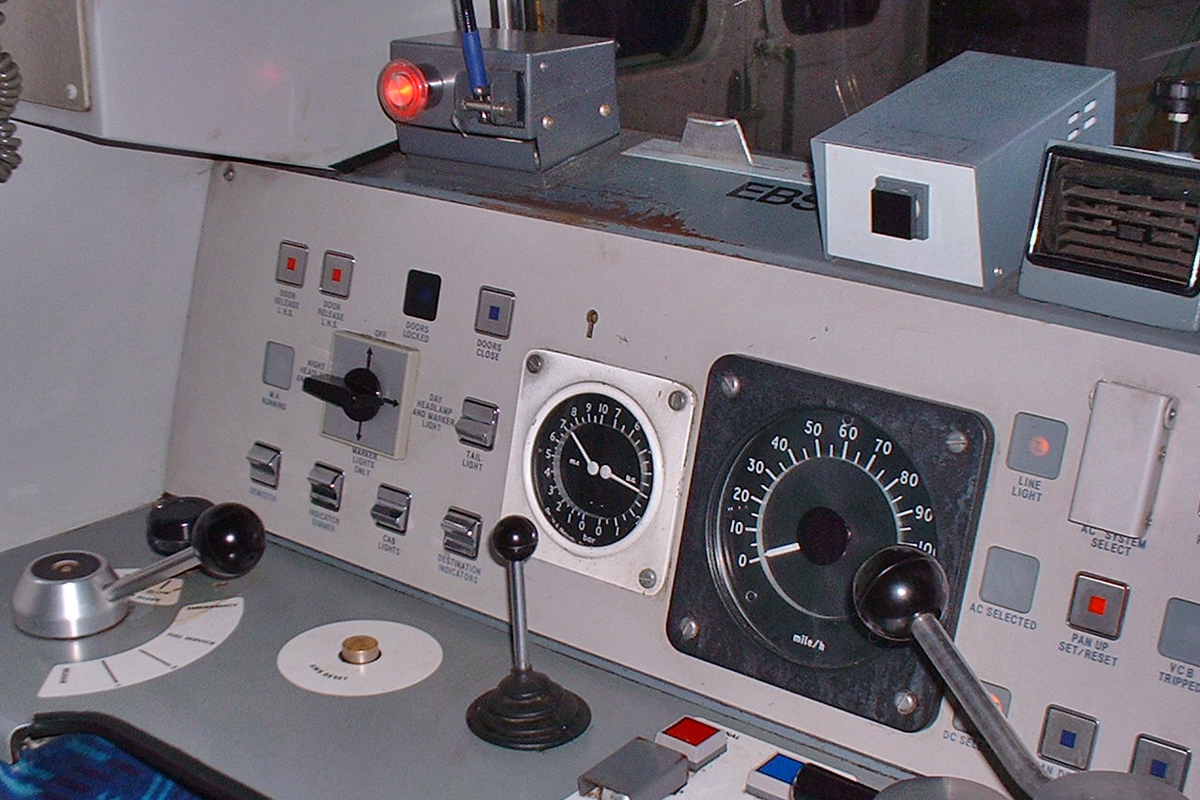
The DRA is the bright red button at top left of the driver's desk.

A driver's reminder appliance (DRA) is a manual switch in the driving cab of a passenger train. When operated it glows bright red and prevents the driver from being able to apply power. It was introduced in the design and operation of United Kingdom passenger trains in the 1990s in response to a series of railway accidents where train drivers had passed a signal at danger when starting away from a station, a so-called "Start Against Signal".

== Operation ==
Use of the DRA is mandatory for drivers of British passenger trains and they are required by the Drivers' Rule Book to set it:

- When closing down, entering or leaving the cab
- When the train is stopped at a red signal
- When the train is stopped after passing a signal displaying a single yellow (caution) aspect. The DRA serves as a reminder that the driver may be approaching a stop signal.

The DRA must only be reset:

- If there is no signal ahead, when the driver has authority to start the train.
- When the signal ahead has cleared to a proceed aspect.
- When the driver has authority to pass the signal ahead at danger.

== Advantages ==
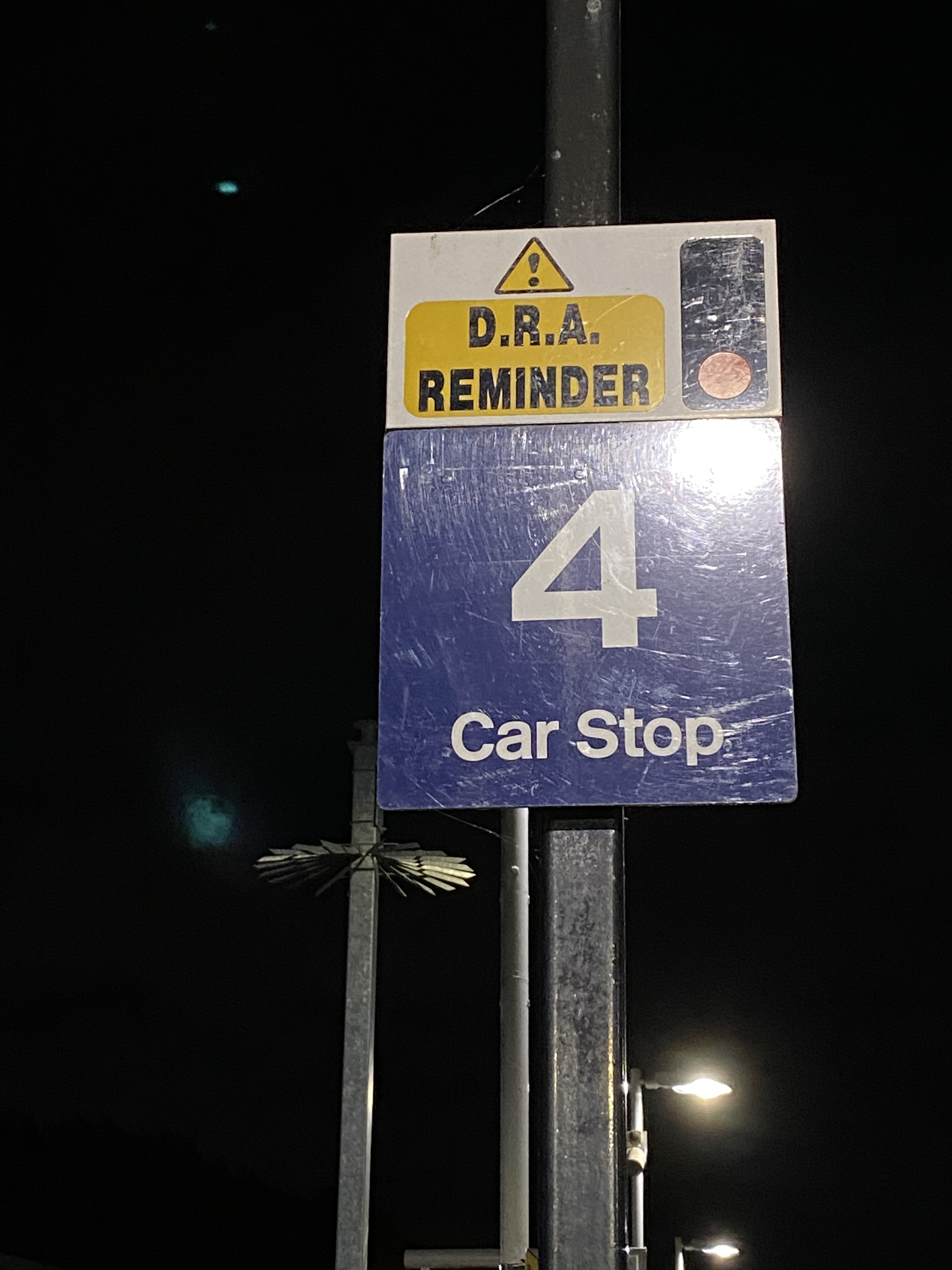
DRA reminder sign on a station platform

A passenger train driver can easily become distracted by station duties and forget that the next signal is at danger. This signal might be hidden from view until the train is close to it and there is insufficient braking distance. The DRA helps prevent this problem because resetting the DRA is the last action the driver will take before powering away from the station.
