= Shell Crisis of 1915 =

Political crisis in Britain

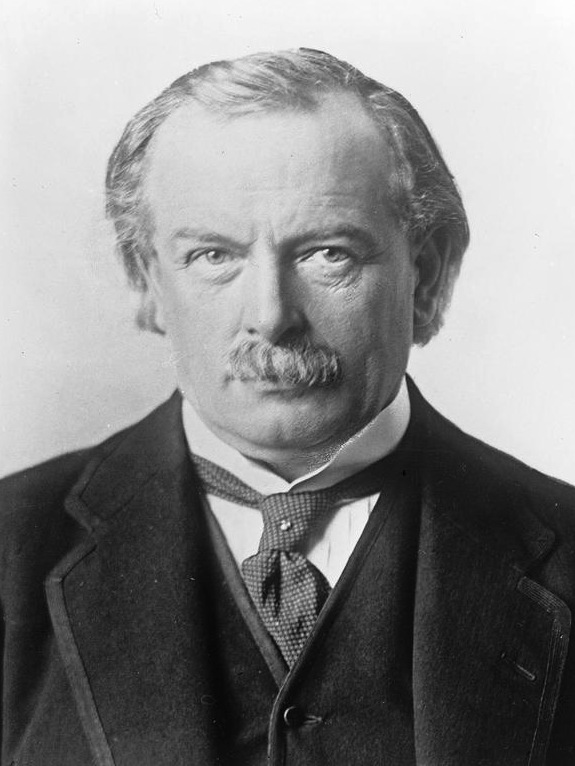
David Lloyd George

The Shell Crisis of 1915 was a shortage of artillery shells on the front lines in the First World War that led to a political crisis in the United Kingdom. Previous military experience led to an over-reliance on shrapnel to attack infantry in the open, which was negated by the resort to trench warfare, for which high-explosive shells were better suited. At the start of the war there was a revolution in doctrine: instead of the idea that artillery was a useful support for infantry attacks, the new doctrine held that heavy guns alone would control the battlefield. Because of the stable lines on the Western Front, it was easy to build railway lines that delivered all the shells the factories could produce. The 'shell scandal' emerged in 1915 because the high rate of fire over a long period was not anticipated and the stock of shells became depleted. The inciting incident was the disastrous Battle of Aubers, which reportedly had been stymied by a lack of shells.

== The Ministry of Munitions ==
The shortage was widely publicised in the press. The Times, in cooperation with David Lloyd George and Lord Northcliffe, sought to force Parliament to adopt a national munitions policy with centralised control. This resulted in a transfer of the Munitions Department from the War Office to a cabinet level position in government, and a coalition government with Lloyd George as Minister of Munitions. In 1916 the long-term effects included the fall of the Prime Minister H. H. Asquith and his replacement by Lloyd George in December 1916 in a new role.

This new role was the Ministry of Munitions. The first Minister of the Minstry of Munitions was David Lloyd George, or more specifically The Right Honourable David Lloyd George. He was Minister from 25 May 1915 to 9 July 1916. The next minister was Edwin Montagu from 9 July 1916 to 10 December 1916. Edwin Montagu was the Financial Secretary to the Treasury. Edwin Montagu replaced David Lloyd George as Minister when David Lloyd George replaced Lord Kitchener as Secretary of State for War after Lord Kitchener's death at sea. The third minister was Dr. Christopher Addison from 10 December 1916 to July 1917. Christopher Addison's previous role was Parliamentary Secretary to the Ministry of Munitions. The last minister was Winston Churchill from 17 July 1917 to 10 January 1919.

The Munitions of War Act 1915 ended the shell crisis and guaranteed a supply of munitions that the Germans were unable to match. The government policy, according to J. A. R. Marriott, was that,

No private interest was to be permitted to obstruct the service, or imperil the safety, of the State. Trade Union regulations must be suspended; employers' profits must be limited, skilled men must fight, if not in the trenches, in the factories; man-power must be economised by the dilution of labour and the employment of women; private factories must pass under the control of the State, and new national factories be set up. Results justified the new policy: the output was prodigious; the goods were at last delivered.

Because of the shell crisis Parliament overlooked the budget of the Ministry of Munitions. There was uncontrolled spending from 1914-1916 in that department. This was because it was hard to estimate how much money would be needed during the World War 1. The House of Commons a Vote of Credit for one hundred million pounds expecting to grant more as the war continued.

Following the creation of the Ministry of Munitions, new factories began to be built for the mass production of war materiel. The construction of these factories took time and to ensure that there was no delay in the production of munitions to deal with the Shell Crisis, the Government turned to railway companies to manufacture materials of war. Railway companies were well placed to manufacture munitions and other war materials, with their large locomotive, carriage works and skilled labourers; by the end of 1915 the railway companies were producing between 1,000 and 5,000 6-inch high explosive shells per week.

As well as the components for a number of different types of shell, the railway companies, under the direction of the Railway War Manufactures Sub-Committee of the Railway Executive Committee, produced mountings for larger artillery, water-tank carts, miners' trucks, heavy-capacity wagons, machinery for howitzer carriages, armoured trains and ambulances. In 1916, when the many factories being constructed by the Ministry of Munitions began producing large volumes of munitions, the work of the railway companies in producing war materials actually increased and they continued to produce high volumes of munitions throughout the war. The official record, presented to the government in May 1920, of the munitions work done throughout the war by the various railway companies ran to a total of 121 pages, giving some idea of the scale of what was undertaken by the railway companies across the country. Many of the companies undertook this vital war work to the detriment of the maintenance of their locomotives, carriages and wagons.

The Munitions of War Act 1915 prevented the resignation of munitions workers without their employer's consent. It was a recognition that the whole economy would have to be mobilised for the war effort if the Allies were to prevail on the Western Front. Supplies and factories in British Commonwealth countries, particularly Canada, were reorganised under the Imperial Munitions Board, to supply adequate shells and other materiel for the remainder of the war. The Health of Munitions Workers Committee, one of the first investigations into occupational safety and health, was set up in 1915 to improve productivity in factories. A huge munitions factory, HM Factory, Gretna was built on the English-Scottish border to produce cordite. There were at least three major explosions in such factories:

1. An explosion at Faversham involving 200 tons of TNT killed 105 in 1916.
2. The National Shell Filling Factory, Chilwell exploded in 1918, killing 137.
3. The Silvertown explosion occurred in Silvertown (now part of the London Borough of Newham, in Greater London) killing 73 and injuring 400 on Friday, 19 January 1917 at 6.52 pm.

== The Times attacks Kitchener ==
Shortage of ammunition had been a serious problem since the autumn of 1914 and the British Commander-in-Chief Field Marshal Sir John French gave an interview to The Times (27 March) calling for more ammunition. On the basis of an assurance from Kitchener, Asquith stated in a speech at Newcastle (20 April) that the army had sufficient ammunition.

After the failed attack at Aubers Ridge on 9 May 1915, The Times war correspondent, Colonel Charles à Court Repington, sent a telegram to his newspaper blaming lack of high-explosive shells. French had, despite Repington's denial of his prior knowledge at the time, supplied him with information and sent Brinsley Fitzgerald and Freddie Guest to London to show the same documents to Lloyd George and senior Conservatives Bonar Law and Arthur Balfour.

Kitchener had withheld Sir John French's memos and letters about the shell shortage from both the orginal Cabinet Shells Committee and the Munitions of War Committee. As a result, he faced widespread criticism and was blamed for this munitions crisis.

The Times headline on 14 May 1915, was: "Need for shells: British attacks checked: Limited supply the cause: A Lesson From France". It commented "We had not sufficient high explosives to lower the enemy's parapets to the ground ... The want of an unlimited supply of high explosives was a fatal bar to our success", blaming the government for the battle's failure. However, due to his reputation, the British public were hesitant to question Kitchener, leading to the subsequent circulation decline of the newspapers despite the growing consensus that the political role was ill-suited.

== Coalition government ==
As the crisis continued, the immediate catalyst for a change in government was the resignation on 15 May of Admiral Fisher as First Sea Lord, owing to disagreements with his ministerial chief, First Lord of the Admiralty Winston Churchill, over the naval attack on the Dardanelles (a precursor to the subsequent stalemated landings at Gallipoli). Churchill was detested by the Conservatives as he had defected from their party over a decade earlier. Chancellor of the Exchequer David Lloyd George and Conservative Leader Bonar Law visited Asquith on 17 May 1915, and after a very brief meeting Asquith wrote to his ministers demanding their resignations, then formed a new coalition government in which he appointed Lloyd George as Minister of Munitions, heading a newly-created government department.

The Shells Crisis had allowed Lloyd George to push for a coalition in which the Liberal Party relinquished their full control while the Conservatives remained in a subordinate position.

Since then no purely Liberal government has held office in the UK, although Liberal politicians have held office in subsequent coalitions.

== Daily Mail attacks Kitchener ==
Whilst Asquith was still forming his new government, a sensational version of the press criticism was printed in the popular Daily Mail on 21 May, blaming Kitchener, under the headline "The Shells Scandal: Lord Kitchener's Tragic Blunder". Lloyd George had to warn Northcliffe that the campaign was counterproductive and creating sympathy for Kitchener. Kitchener wanted to let the Shells Scandal drop. Stanley von Donop, Master-General of the Ordnance, demanded an Inquiry to clear his name but Kitchener persuaded him to withdraw the request as it would have led to French's dismissal.

Lord Northcliffe, a former friend of Kitchener, launched political attacks against him in the Daily Mail and began a campaign highlighting the shells scandal. Although Kitchener still had some support within the Cabinet, Northcliffe's campaign further damaged his reputation. However, it also strengthened Lloyd George's position in discussions about resolving the munitions crisis.

Kitchener, popular with the public, remained in office as Secretary of State for War, responsible for training and equipping the volunteer New Armies, but lost control over munitions production and was increasingly sidelined from control of military strategy. French was also tarnished by his blatant meddling in politics, a factor which contributed to his enforced resignation in December 1915.

== See also ==
- Filling factories in the United Kingdom
- Munitionettes
- National Filling Factory, Georgetown (NFF No 4, in Scotland)
- Carlisle Experiment
