= Paisley Gilmour Street railway station =

Railway station in Renfrewshire, Scotland

Paisley Gilmour Street Scottish Gaelic: Sràid GhilleMhoire Phàislig
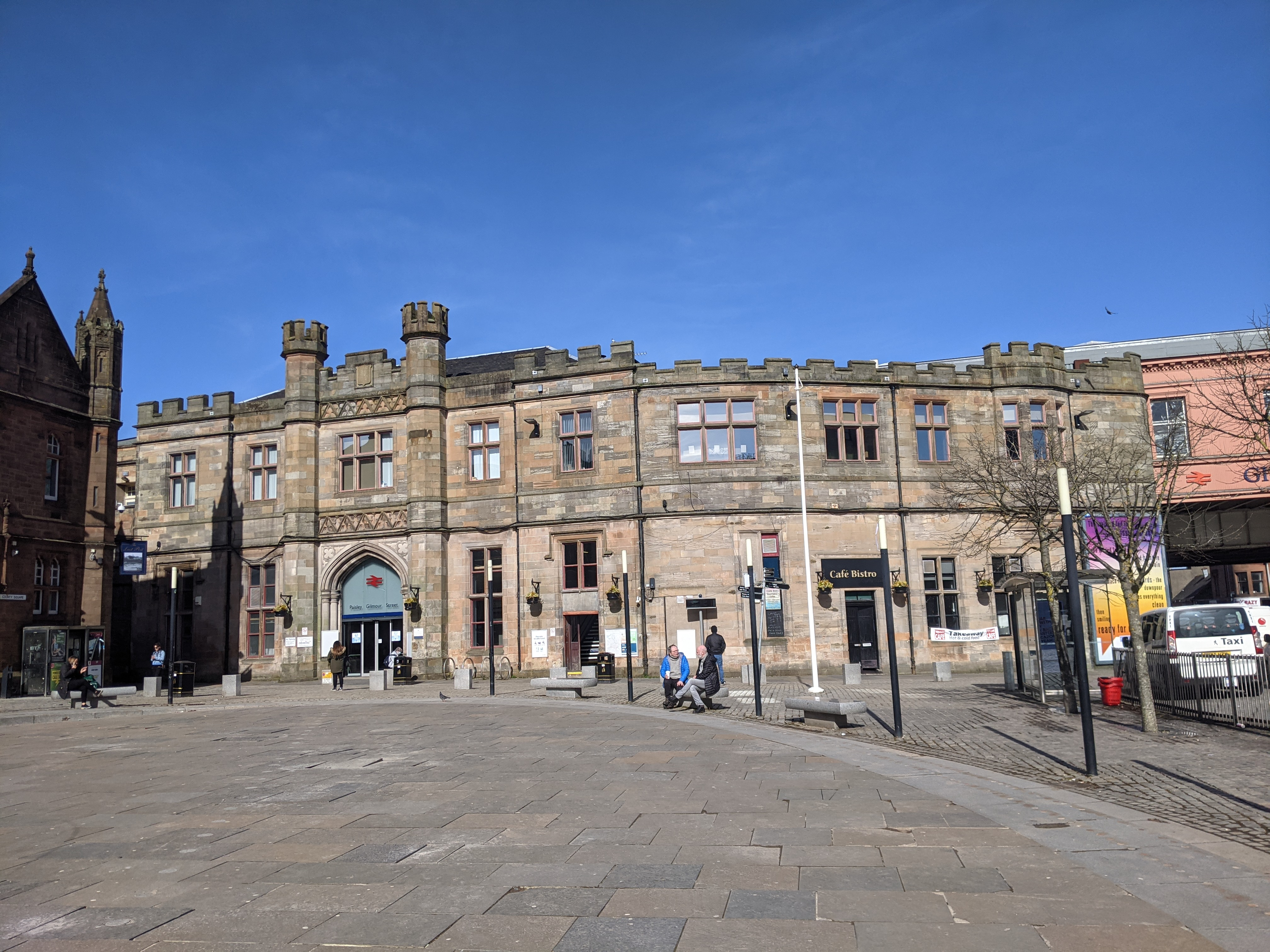
- The main entrance of Paisley Gilmour Street from County Square

General information
- Location: Paisley, Renfrewshire; Scotland
- Coordinates: 55.8474°N 4.4242°W
- Grid reference: NS482642
- Owner: Network Rail
- Manager: ScotRail
- Transit authority: SPT
- Platforms: 4

Other information
- Station code: PYG
- Fare zone: 2

History
- Original company: Glasgow, Paisley, Kilmarnock and Ayr Railway & Glasgow, Paisley and Greenock Railway
- Pre-grouping: CR & G&SWR
- Post-grouping: LMS

Key dates
- 14 July 1840: Opened: 2 platforms and 2 lines
- 1880: Expanded to 4 lines and 4 platforms

Passengers
- 2020/21: ▼0.983 million
- 2021/22: ▲2.124 million
- Interchange: 67,215
- 2022/23: ▲2.600 million
- Interchange: ▲75,085
- 2023/24: ▲3.196 million
- Interchange: ▲0.147 million
- 2024/25: ▲3.241 million
- Interchange: ▲0.193 million

Listed Building – Category B
- Designated: 27 March 1985
- Reference no.: LB38950
Location
Notes
- Passenger statistics from the Office of Rail and Road

Paisley Gilmour Street railway station is the largest of the four stations serving the town of Paisley, Renfrewshire, Scotland (the others being Paisley St. James, Paisley Canal and Hawkhead), and acts as the town's principal railway station (being the busiest of the four Paisley stations) and also serves Glasgow Airport with easy walking and cycling access as well as a bus service from the station to the terminal. The station is managed by ScotRail and is on the Ayrshire Coast Line and Inverclyde Line, 6 miles 47 chains (10.6 km) measured from Glasgow Bridge Street. It is between Paisley St James to the west, Johnstone to the south west, and Hillington West to the north east. The station is protected as a category B listed building.

== History ==
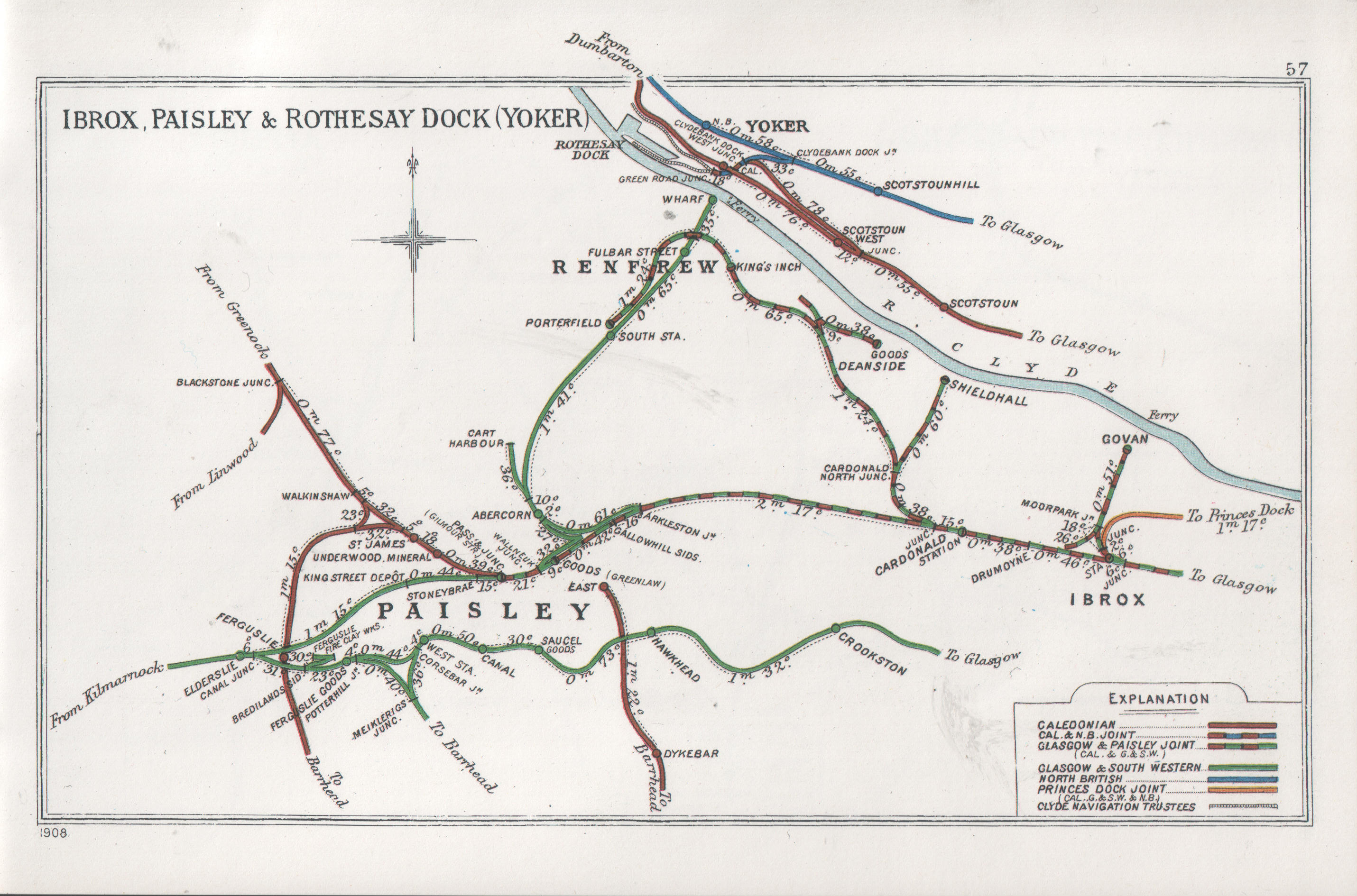
Railway Clearing House diagram of lines through Paisley in 1908

The station was opened on 14 July 1840 on the Glasgow, Paisley, Kilmarnock and Ayr Railway (GPK&AR). The station was used jointly by the GPK&AR and the Glasgow, Paisley and Greenock Railway (GP&GR). However, the GP&GR did not run services until March 1841 due to construction difficulties at Bishopton.

It was originally built with only two through platforms, with the GPK&R and the GP&GR lines separating to the west of the station. The station was later expanded to four platforms, two for the GPK&R and two for the GP&GR, with the lines separating to the east of the station.

The section between Bridge Street railway station and Paisley Gilmour Street station was a joint line: the Glasgow and Paisley Joint Railway.

=== Twentieth century ===
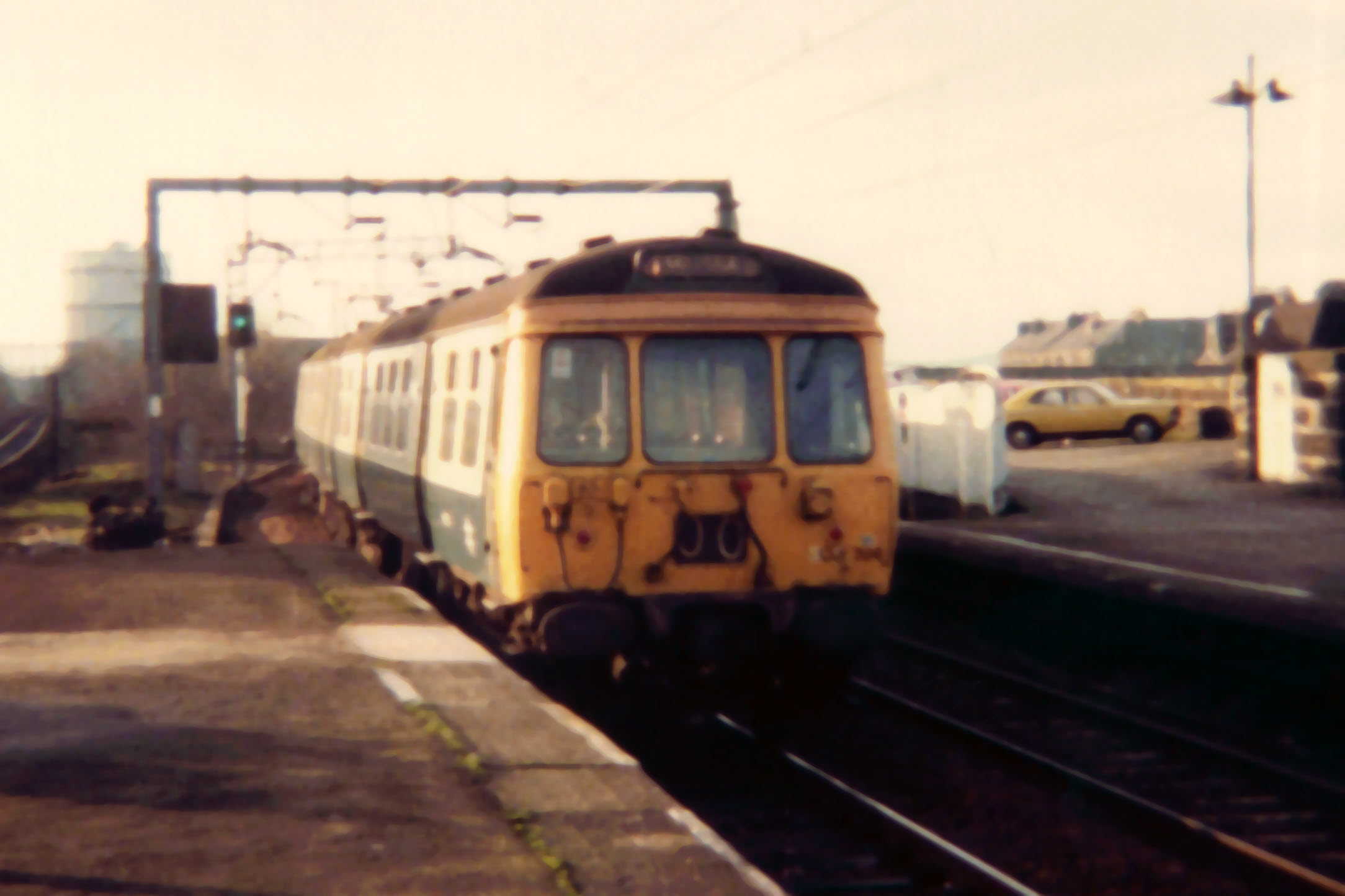
A Class 311 departs for Gourock in 1981

The station was electrified as part of the 1967 Inverclyde Line. Ayrshire Coast Line platforms (then numbered 1 and 2) were wired, however the wires finished a short distance west of the station. These were extended as part of the Ayrshire Line electrification by British Rail in 1986. This 1986 work coincided with the renumbering of the platforms with the Glasgow bound platforms numbered 1 (Inverclyde) and 3 (Ayrshire), and the outbound platforms numbers 2 (Inverclyde) and 4 (Ayrshire).

Following extensive works, the main access onto County Square, has been joined by a re-opened back access onto Back Sneddon Street. The access was originally built along with the station, but had closed and had been converted into a model shop for a number of years. Despite this conversion the shop retained the steps up to stations lower concourse, however it has been bricked up to prevent access. When the shop owner retired, it was decided to purchase the unit and convert it back as part of the step free access works for disabled people, as it would increase space within the station, and the works were fairly simple since the original stairs were retained. After re-opening it was signed as a dedicated exit to the station for those wishing to use the bus link to the airport, as the buses stop directly outside the door and the airport cycle route which passes outside.

=== Accidents and incidents ===
The Paisley Gilmour Street rail accident occurred on 16 April 1979. A service from Glasgow Central to Wemyss Bay crossed from the Down Fast Line to the Down Gourock Line under clear signals at Wallneuk Junction immediately to the east of Paisley Gilmour Street railway station. It collided head-on with a service from Ayr to Glasgow Central, which had left Platform 2 against a red signal.

The DMU had started away from the platform against a red signal. A type of SASSPAD (starting against signal at danger) accident, also colloquially known as ding-ding, and away. This accident prompted British Rail to change the Rules so that the bell or "Right Away" signal is only given when the Starting signal has been cleared.

Both drivers and five passengers were killed. 67 passengers and the guard of the Class 303 were injured and were taken to hospital. Only three of these remained in hospital.

The Ayrshire Coast services were diverted onto the Paisley Canal Line. Both lines were handed back for normal operations at 23:00 on 17 April.

== Facilities ==
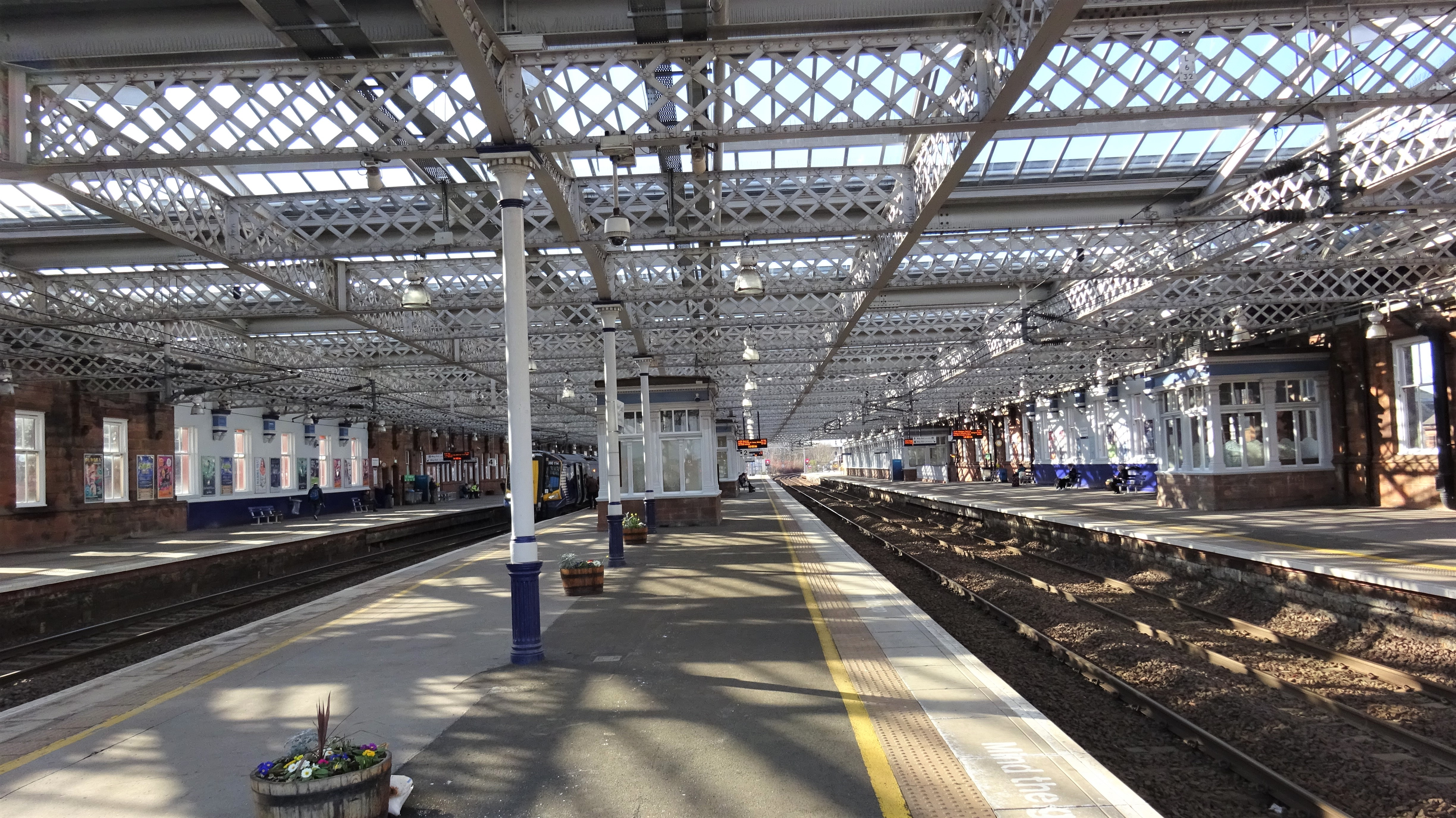
The inside of the station

The station has adequate facilities for passengers including a ticket office and ticket machines, accessible toilets, waiting rooms, a small car park, an ATM, a coffee kiosk and bicycle storage. The station has full step-free access.

== Passenger volume ==
Passenger volume at Paisley Gilmour Street
| | 2004–05 | 2005–06 | 2006–07 | 2007–08 | 2008–09 | 2009–10 | 2010–11 | 2011–12 | 2012–13 | 2013–14 | 2014–15 | 2015–16 | 2016–17 | 2017–18 | 2018–19 | 2019–20 | 2020–21 | 2021–22 | 2022–23 | 2023–24 | 2024–25 |
|---|---|---|---|---|---|---|---|---|---|---|---|---|---|---|---|---|---|---|---|---|---|
| Entries and exits | 2,832,463 | 3,069,247 | 3,151,932 | 3,219,554 | 3,611,790 | 3,528,050 | 3,679,066 | 3,640,560 | 3,745,156 | 3,954,518 | 4,090,566 | 4,157,808 | 4,115,272 | 4,151,566 | 4,027,962 | 3,903,776 | 982,530 | 2,124,248 | 2,600,030 | 3,196,172 | 3,241,120 |
| Interchanges | 56,447 | 63,857 | 60,848 | 79,476 | 92,236 | 87,331 | 105,209 | 112,626 | 122,336 | 108,352 | 171,299 | 111,039 | 119,548 | 115,955 | 124,358 | 118,567 | 18,619 | 67,215 | 75,085 | 147,444 | 193,147 |

The statistics cover twelve month periods that start in April.

== Services ==
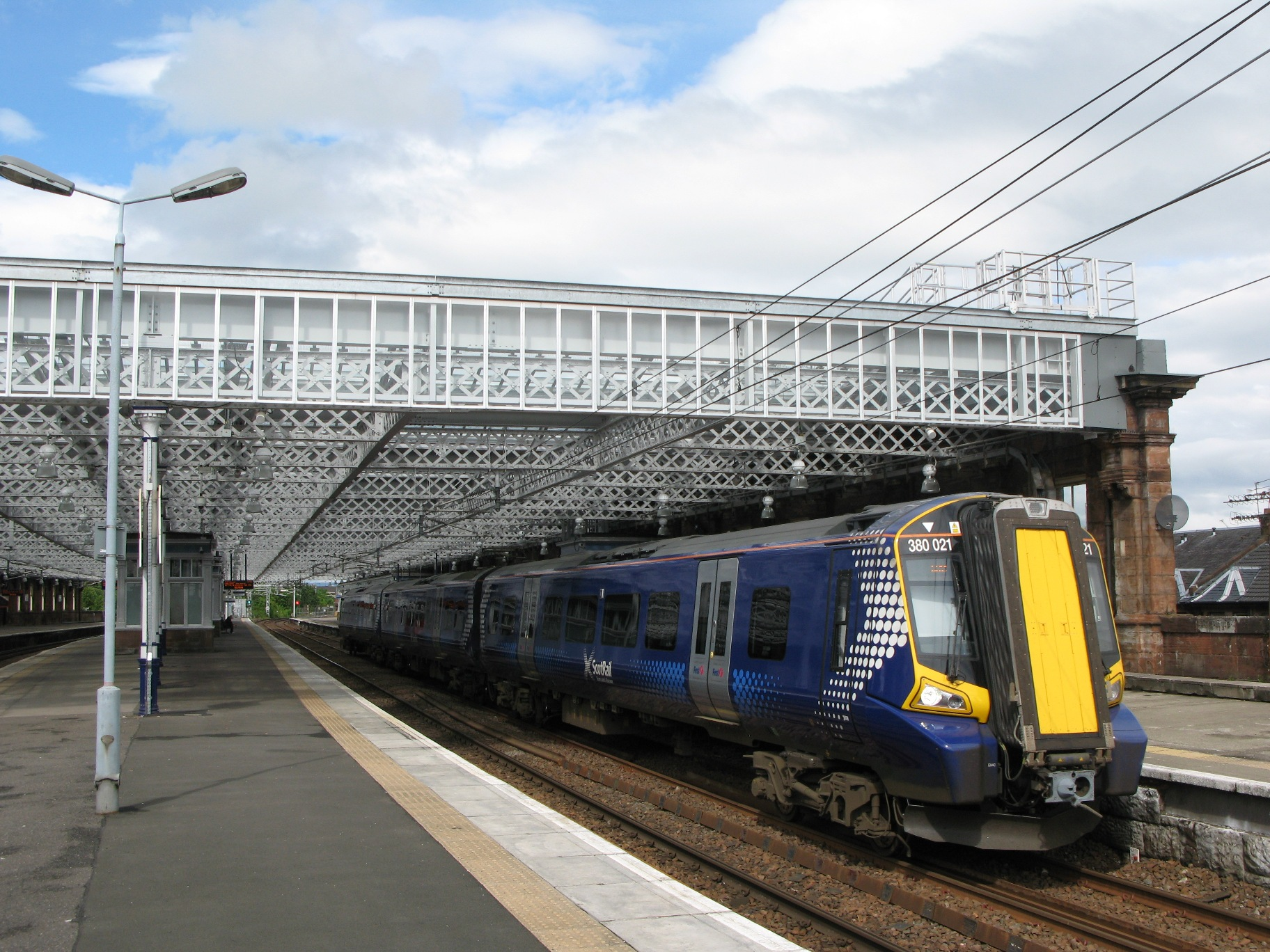
A Class 380 on an Inverclyde Line service to Glasgow Central in 2012

All services at Paisley Gilmour Street are operated by ScotRail. As of November 2024, the typical off-peak service in trains per hour (tph) is:

- 8 tph to Glasgow Central (2 of which are stopping services, and the remaining 6 run non-stop)
- 2 tph to Gourock
- 2 tph to Wemyss Bay
- 1 tph to Largs
- 1 tph to Ardrossan Harbour
- 2 tph to Ayr

| Preceding station | National Rail | Following station |
|---|---|---|
| Johnstone | ScotRail; Ayrshire Coast Line | Glasgow Central |
| Paisley St James | ScotRail; Inverclyde Line | Hillington West |
| | Historical railways | |
| Paisley St James | Caledonian Railway; Glasgow, Paisley and Greenock Railway | Connection with G&PJR |
| Elderslie; Line open; station closed | Glasgow and South Western Railway; Glasgow, Paisley, Kilmarnock and Ayr Railway | Connection with G&PJR |
| Connections with GP&GR and GPK&AR | Caledonian and Glasgow & South Western Railways; Glasgow and Paisley Joint Railway | Cardonald |

== Connections ==
=== Ferries ===
Trains connect Ayr along the Glasgow South Western Line to Stranraer where a bus link runs, route 350 operated by McLeans (except Sundays) to Cairnryan.

=== Buses ===
Connecting buses from this station also serve nearby Glasgow Airport (GLA) which is approximately 2 km (1.2 mi) away. The Glasgow Airport Rail Link would have replaced this bus service with a direct train, but the project was cancelled in September 2009 due to public spending cuts. It is also possible to cycle from the station to the Airport using the Airport Cycle Route.

== See also ==
- List of listed buildings in Paisley, Renfrewshire

== Bibliography ==
- Brailsford, Martyn, ed. (December 2017) [1987]. Railway Track Diagrams 1: Scotland & Isle of Man (6th ed.). Frome: Trackmaps. ISBN 978-0-9549866-9-8.
- Butt, R. V. J. (October 1995). The Directory of Railway Stations: details every public and private passenger station, halt, platform and stopping place, past and present (1st ed.). Sparkford: Patrick Stephens Ltd. ISBN 978-1-85260-508-7. OCLC 60251199. OL 11956311M.
- Jowett, Alan (March 1989). Jowett's Railway Atlas of Great Britain and Ireland: From Pre-Grouping to the Present Day (1st ed.). Sparkford: Patrick Stephens Ltd. ISBN 978-1-85260-086-0. OCLC 22311137.
- Hall, Stanley (1987). Danger Signals. Ian Allan. ISBN 0-7110-1704-2.
- Hall, Stanley (1999). Hidden Dangers: Railway Safety in the Era of Privatisation. Shepperton: Ian Allan. ISBN 0-7110-2679-3.
- Thomas, John (1971). A Regional History of the Railways of Great Britain. Vol. VI Scotland: The Lowlands and the Borders (1st ed.). Newton Abbot, Devon: David & Charles. ISBN 0-7153-5408-6. OCLC 16198685.
- Thomas, John; Paterson, Rev A. J. S. (1984). A Regional History of the Railways of Great Britain. Vol. VI Scotland: The Lowlands and the Borders (2nd ed.). Newton Abbott, Devon: David & Charles. ISBN 0-9465-3712-7. OCLC 12521072.
