= Ding-ding, and away =

British railway slang

Ding-ding, and away is a slang expression used by the UK media and railway enthusiasts to describe a type of operating incident in the British railway industry where the guard of a train standing at a platform gives a "ready to start" bell code to the driver, when the platform starting signal is at danger, and the driver then moves the train past the signal without checking it. This constitutes a signal passed at danger (SPAD).

== Overview ==
On multiple unit trains, the guard uses a buzzer code to communicate with the driver. Once the doors have closed and platform duties are complete, the guard informs the driver by sending the signal for "ready to start", which is two rings (hence "ding-ding"). There was a debate whether guards should only give the "ready to start" or station staff the "right away" signal if the platform starting signal was clear. The British Railways Board refused to change the rules, saying that the driver alone should have the responsibility to comply with signals. Initially the Railway Inspectorate agreed, for example in the report on the early example at Woolwich Arsenal in 1948. However, accidents in the 1970s culminating in seven people being killed at Paisley Gilmour Street in 1979 caused the rules to be changed in 1980, with the effect that giving the signal to "close doors", "ready to start" or "right away" whilst the starting signal is at danger now constitutes an operating incident. At certain stations where long passenger trains call, "OFF" indicators are installed on platforms that illuminate when the corresponding platform starting signal is not at danger, giving the train guard an opportunity to check a signal which otherwise the guard would not be able to see.

"Ding-ding, and away" events continue to occur despite the rule change and the introduction of equipment such as the driver's reminder appliance. On trains which work under driver-only operation (DOO) drivers perform the platform duties themselves and so may be distracted by activity on the platform which causes them to close the doors and move away without checking the signal, as in the Newton rail crash of 1991. With driver-only operation now more common, the term "Starting against signal, [where the] signal [is] passed at danger" (SASSPAD) is now used.

== See also ==
- Glasgow Bellgrove rail crash
