= Gunpowder Railway =

Railway in the UK at the Waltham Abbey Royal Gunpowder Mills

Coordinates: 51.6991°N 0.0124°W

- Locale: Waltham Abbey, Essex, England
- Terminus: Long Walk Station

Commercial operations
- Original gauge: 2 ft 3 in (686 mm), 18 in (457 mm)

Preserved operations
- Operated by: Royal Gunpowder Mills
- Stations: 2
- Length: 1,000 metres (3,300 ft)
- Preserved gauge: 2 ft 6 in (762 mm)

Commercial history
- Opened: 1859
- Closed: 1961

Preservation history
- 2003: Restoration begins
- 2018: Initial trackworks complete
- 2022: First passenger service on the restored line operates

The Gunpowder Railway is a 2 ft 6 in (762 mm) narrow-gauge railway running roughly 1 km along the perimeter of the Waltham Abbey Royal Gunpowder Mills site. During the late 19th and early 20th centuries, an extensive narrow-gauge railway was used to transport materials used in the manufacture of gunpowder around the Gunpowder Mills site.

It was reconstructed during 2003–2018 and since 2022 has operated as a heritage tourist attraction.

== History ==
The earliest known reference to a Railway at Waltham Abbey Gunpowder Mills appears in a 9 January 1856 plan from the RARDE Historical Collection. It details the layout for a new steam-powered gunpowder mill (later known as Group A mill). The plan shows a raised railway running along the north side of the proposed building and two turntables at the eastern end, positioned near two magazines.

In February 1859, the railway started operating connecting the charcoal mill and gunpowder mixing house to the new steam incorporating mill. Initially it was only about 600 feet (180 m) long, and its function would probably be to convey the loosely mixed ingredients of gunpowder (charcoal, saltpetre, and sulphur) rapidly and safely from the mixing house to the incorporating mill. The railway was constructed using wooden rails to prevent sparks setting off the gunpowder.

By 1888, the railway linked the gunpowder mixing house with the Group A, C, D, E, and F Incorporating Mills, and extended to the new canal cut (Powdermill Cut where a present day station is situated), which terminated by the Group F Mill and its associated magazine and the wooden rails were swapped for steel ones along with the gauge changing from 2 ft 4 in (711 mm) to 18 in (457 mm). Then, in 1889, manufacturing switched to cordite the railway was used to transport the primary ingredients nitroglycerin and guncotton as well.

During World War 1, major changes were required to the narrow-gauge railway to upgrade it to be suitable for lightweight locomotives, and adding interchange sidings with the Great Northern Railway adjacent to the Royal Small Arms Factory. The upgrades included the use of iron rails and took the railway to approximately 2 miles (3.2 km) in length.

The factory continued to expand after World War 1, and the manufacture of TNT and RDX was commenced. This development took the railway to some 3.5 miles (5.6 km) in length with a maximum gradient of 1 in 30 along with the use battery locomotives and briefly 4x petrol/paraffin locomotives.

Due to the risk of a gunpowder factory being in close proximity to London, manufacture ceased in 1943 with manufacturing transferring to ROF Bishopton in Scotland, and by 1952 the railway link connecting the North and South Sites had been dismantled, but some of the railway and the battery locomotives remaining in use in 1954. Railway operations ceased entirely by the 1960s, and the site in its research role was ultimately decommissioned in 1991.

== Heritage reconstruction ==
Between 2003 and 2018, a dedicated team of volunteers reconstructed a 2 ft 6 in (762 mm) railway, reflecting this history. The Gunpowder Railway completed its first full public running season by the end of October in 2022, transporting over 1500 passengers. With nearly 2,000 carried during the 2025 running taking the total carried to over 7,500 passengers by September 2025.

The 2 ft 6 in (762 mm) gauge narrow-gauge railway is 1,100 yards (1,000 m) long and has two stations: one on the Long Walk and the other Powdermill Cut near area 83 known as the "Railway Works", the current terminus of the railway. There are passing loops at both ends with plans in place to extend the running line in either direction over the coming years.

At the Railway Works, there is an Ordinance Railway Museum containing two demonstration trains showcasing examples of all of the railway trucks previously used on site to carry the materials between the different processing buildings in the manufacture of gunpowder, cordite and other explosives; and one with examples of the different rolling stock used across RNAD depots for moving finished munitions.

Most of the heritage rolling stock in use is from ROF Bishopton, RNAD Dean Hill and RNAD Trecwn with a couple of examples from RNAD Broughton Moor.

Passenger rolling stock is converted RNAD trucks.

== Heritage Operations ==
Trains run every Saturday and alternative Sundays from April until end of September. Typically 4 trains per day.

List of locomotives on site
Name	Builder	Works number	Type	Built	Original Location	Status	Notes
Wickham	Wickham	NA	4wPM	2026	RGMWA	Operational	Replica new build Wickham Trolley
15	Hunslet	9080	4wDH	1984	ROF Bishopton	Under Restoration	One of the very last Hunslets manufactured for ROF Bishopton stored in a barn for nearly 25 years arrived at Gunpowder Railway in September 2026.
John H. Bowles	Baguley-Drewry	3755	4wDH	1981	RNAD Dean Hill	Operational	009 scale model of this loco has been made by Bachmann Branchline originally built for use at the Royal Naval Armnet Depot (RNAD) Dean Hill. Arrived in 2009.
4 / Chris H	Hunslet	8828	4wDH	1979	ROF Bishopton	Operational	First locomotive, arrived in July 2003 from the now-closed Royal Ordnance Factory at Bishopton in Scotland. Arrived in 2003.
5 / Betsy	Hunslet	8829	4wDH	1979	ROF Bishopton	Awaiting Restoration	Privately owned
Gilbert	Hunslet	8819	4wDM	1979	Nantgarw Colliery	Operational	Originally 3 ft (914 mm) gauge and made for the NCB in Wales. Arrived and regauged in 2021.
Blue Thunder	Ruhrthaler	3920	4wDM	1969	Rome	Operational	A mining/tunneling locomotive built for use on the construction of Rome Metro Line A tunnels between 1969 and 1980. Arrived in 2007.
Tinkabell	Ruston & Hornsby	398101	Ruston LBU - 4wDM	1956	RNSD Copenacre	Operational	Originally at Royal Naval Stores Depot (RNSD) Copenacre near Bristol. Arrived in April 2026.
11	Ateliers_Moës-Freres	?	4wDM	1954	Rumst	Awaiting Restoration	Arrived September 2026
BB307	Greenwood and Batley	6099	4wDE	1964	RAF Harpur Hill	Stored	Built specifically for use at the Safety in Mines Research Station (Harpur Hill) Buxton and 3 foot gauge - uniquely the only diesel locomotive ever made by Greenwood and Batley using a ruston engine.
Stuart J	Greenwood and Batley	1671	4wBE	1940	RGMWA	Replica > Static Display	Constructed in 2024.
Mars	Vulcan Foundry	WF 1160	0-4-2T	1886	Royal Arsenal	Static Display	Only the boiler remains of this steam locomotive, also used at Longmoor Military Railway.
