= ROF Bishopton =

Ordnance factory in Renfrewshire, Scotland,

Royal Ordnance Factory
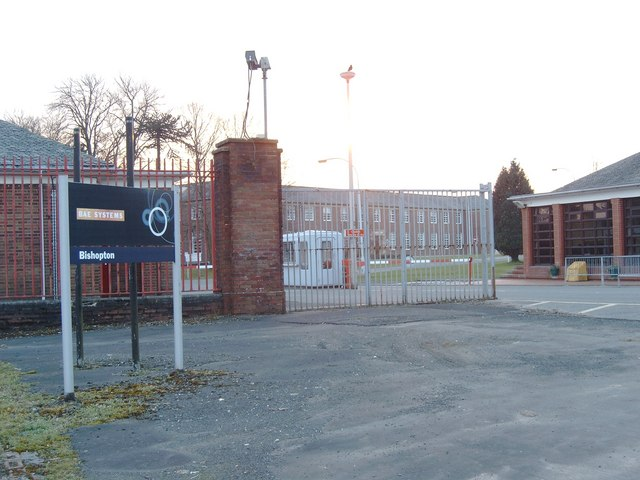
- Entrance gates (in 2007)
- Built: 1937
- Location: Bishopton, Scotland
- Coordinates: 55°54′04″N 4°30′15″W
- Industry: Defence
- Products: Munitions
- Employees: 20,000+ (approx)
- Area: 2,350 acres (950 ha)
- Defunct: 2002

The Royal Ordnance Factory (ROF) Bishopton was a WW2 Ministry of Supply Explosive Factory. It is sited adjacent to the village of Bishopton in Renfrewshire, Scotland. The factory was built to manufacture the propellant cordite for the British Army and the Royal Air Force. It also later produced cordite for the Royal Navy. The Ministry of Works was responsible for designing the layout of the factory, its buildings and overseeing its construction on the chosen site.

ROF Bishopton was the MOD's largest Second World War munitions factory, with up to 20,000 workers.

== History ==
As part of the pre-war production planning, the Cabinet had agreed in the mid-1930s that the run-down Royal Gunpower Factory at Waltham Abbey should be replaced by a new, modern and permanent propellant factory to be built at an already chosen site near the village of Bishopton, Renfrewshire. This factory, ROF Bishopton, was intended have three production units. However, very little was to happen until January 1937 when approval was given to start work on contructing only the first unit. This single unit was only to replace the capacity of the Royal Gunpowder Factory which was the only source of propellant for the army and the airforce, not to increase it. (Note: The First World War Royal Naval Cordite Factory, Holton Heath (RNCF Holton Heath) was still producing propellants for Royal Navy use.)

By January 1939, the anticipated need for propellants for use in air defence had exceeded the total output design capacity of the first unit being constructed at Bishopton, so approval was given to start work on a second unit there. Approval was also given in January 1939 to construct the Royal Naval Propellant Factory, Caerwent to supplement the output of naval propellant from RNCF Holton Heath.

The explosives factory opened between December 1940 and April 1941. It was one of three Second World War propellant factories built for the MOD. The others were ROF Wrexham and ROF Ranskill. Manufacturing continued on parts of the Bishopton site until 2002. The site is still owned by BAE Systems, who in conjunction with Redrow Homes, have submitted proposals to use the site for building new housing. This development is now underway and is known as Dargavel Village.

== Site ==
=== Location ===
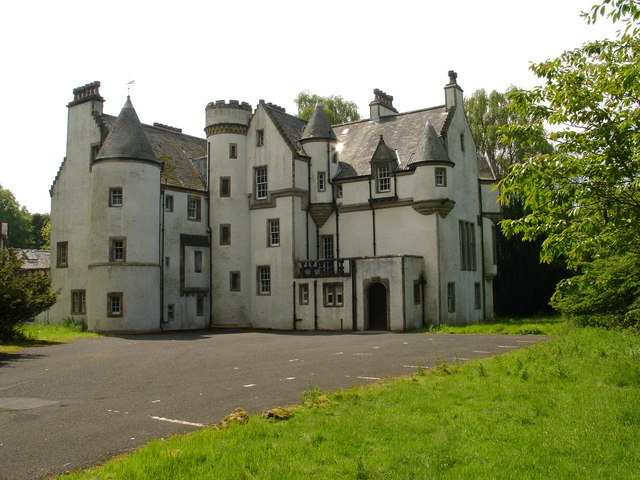
The Category B listed Dargavel House

The Royal Ordnance Factory was built on mostly farm land acquired by compulsory purchase order. Over 2,000 acres (8.1 km^{2}) of land from up to seven farms was used to accommodate the factory.

The land nearest to the village of Bishopton included the Category B listed Dargavel House with its, former, surrounding land and public roads. The oldest part of Dargavel house is a Z-plan tower house, built in 1584 by the Maxwell family of Dargavel, the family having obtained land three years earlier. They later employed David Bryce to add a new wing between 1849 and 1851. The house was remodelled by Peter MacGregor Chalmers in 1910, and again during its ownership by the ROF and BAE to suit their needs. The house still survives within the site boundary, as well as several former farm houses and public roads that were absorbed into the ROF site.

The southern end of the site included land occupied by the former National Filling Factory (a WW1 munitions factory).

Much of the site lies around 10 metres elevation. This was one of the deciding factors for its location, as UK explosives factories were built near to sea level to take account of their favourable microclimates. Some of the site's high-grounds were used for the nitroglycerin hills. Another reason this site was chosen was because of the area's high unemployment rate in the 1920s and 1930s. This meant there was a ready supply of female labour available to work in the factory. Access to nearby railway lines was an important factor in locating the factory at Bishopton: for transporting bulk loads of raw materials and final products (initially just propellants); and for enabling their employees, working on a three shift system, to get to work and back. (Note: As an Explosive ROF, site elevation and a guaranteed water supply were vital factors. However, strategic location also had to be considered; and the possibly conflicting factors of locating the ROFs in economically depressed regions and /or avoiding areas of the UK that were considered vunerable to air attack from hostile troops occupying continental Europe. This is complicated subject, see Chapter IX: The Strategic Location of Factories in (Hornby 1958, pp. 285–296) for more details.)

The site consisted of three almost self-contained explosive-manufacturing factories, with a common administration group and workshop support service. Building work on the first factory started in April 1937. The second started in April 1939 and the third in October 1939. There was a long delay in opening the first factory due to the critical lack of a guaranteed water supply. The site has three separate water mains: fire fighting, process water and drinking water. A guaranteed supply of about ten million gallons per day was required.

=== Factory 0 ===
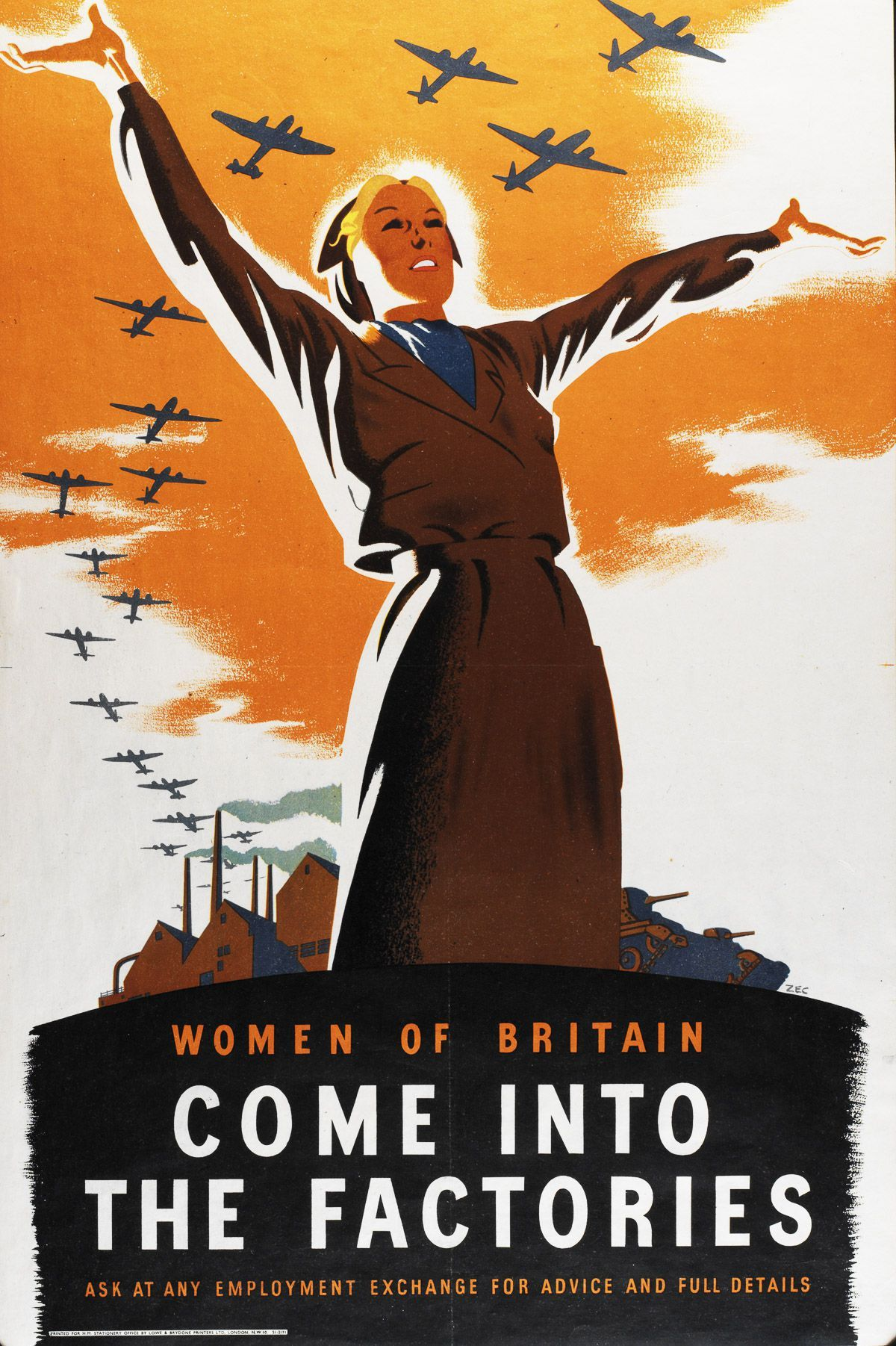
One of the many posters encouraging women to work in the factories during the War

Every building on the site was numbered; one part of the number code indicated if the building was assigned to Factory 0, I, II and III. The non-explosive sectors of the site were housed in Factory 0 (mostly nearest to Bishopton itself). As a safeguard against the risks of any explosion, blast, or thrown debris, the three explosive factories were sited much further away from residential areas of the village.

Factory 0 contained most of the supporting services for the site: a permanently staffed fire station with its own fire brigade, a clothing department, general stores, laboratories, machine shops, general workshops, laundry, leather workshop, chemical plumber's workshop, carpenter's workshop, and ammunition box stores. It also housed the administration block, some of the site's many canteens, ambulance station, medical centre, mortuary and the motor transport section.

=== Factories I, II and III ===
Factories I, II and III each had its own coal-fired power station producing high-pressure steam for generating electricity using steam-turbine alternators, with the resulting low pressure steam used for site heating and cordite drying. The three power stations were also interlinked by high-pressure steam mains. Each factory had three nitroglycerin hills with nitration plants operating a batch production process to produce nitroglycerin. Nitroglycerin and nitrocellulose were then processed to produce cordite.

Nearly all the buildings, with the exception of those on the nitroglycerin hills which were light-weight, were steel framed buildings with triple-brick walls and bomb-proof reinforced concrete roofs. Some of the buildings in factory III, which was built last, such as the power station, were clad with corrugated iron to reduce costs.

ROF Bishopton had an RDX plant installed at the site during World War II. The plant was declared surplus to requirements and was dismantled in 1950. It was shipped to Australia and re-erected. Included within the site boundary was an armoured fighting vehicle storage compound. This was linked to the REME repair factory at Linwood.

=== Railways ===
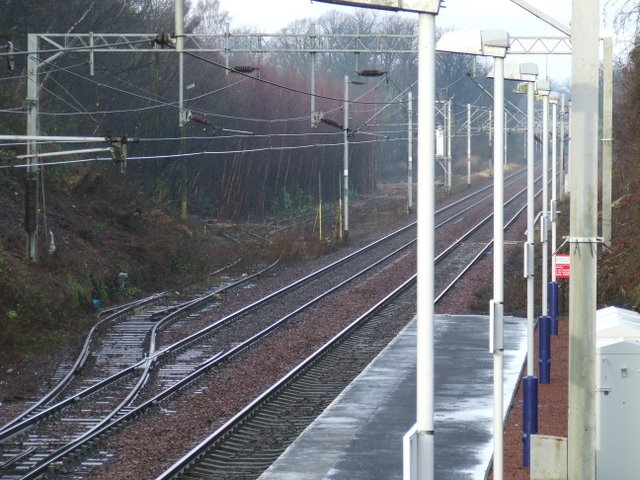
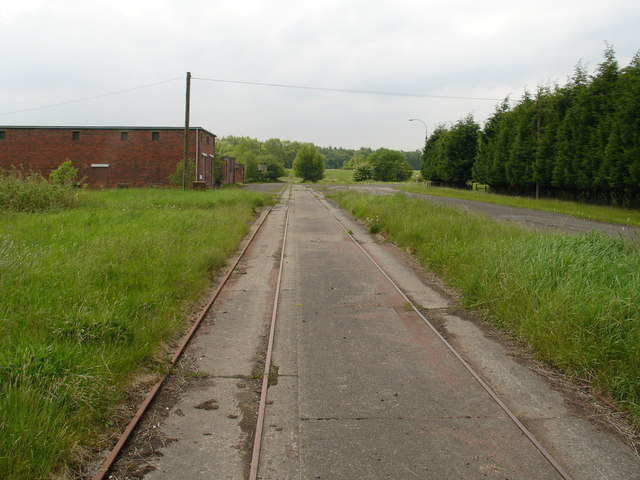
(Left) Transfer sidings leading to factory (right) narrow gauge railway lines

The southern end of the site near the River Gryfe was connected to what was then the LMS former Caledonian Railway line. The connection, just north of the former Georgetown railway station, dated back to World War I and the Georgetown Filling Factory. This railway connection was probably severed and the rail tracks lifted when the Inverclyde Line was electrified in the 1960s. Within ROF Bishopton's perimeter fence, the railtrack was still there in the early 1990s, albeit with 20- to 30-year-old trees growing between the sleepers and rails.

The main link, to and from the ROF railway, was to the Inverclyde line close to Bishopton station. The factory had transfer sidings connecting to both the up and down lines. The ROF line, which was never electrified, ran on to the transfer sidings a few yards west from the Bishopton station. It crossed Ingleston Road via a gated level crossing, before entering the ROF site from the north. The link remained in-situ up until closure of the factory, but was little used after the early 1990s.

There was about 20 miles (32 km) of standard gauge railway line within the perimeter fence. The factory had its own fleet of nitric acid wagons and diesel shunting locomotives. The latter were used to move wagons between the transfer sidings and various locations within the site. In addition, ROF Bishopton had some 80 miles (130 km) of 2 ft 6 in (762 mm) narrow gauge railway lines for transporting explosives around the site. There was a large fleet of rolling stock and a specialist workshop for maintenance of the locomotives, which were kept in excellent mechanical condition. Much of Bishopton's narrow gauge railway equipment still exists, and can be seen at locations such as the Almond Valley Light Railway (six assorted locomotives), Gunpowder Railway (locomotive and many wagons) and the Amberley Museum Railway (locomotive No. 12 and several wagons).

=== Housing ===
Housing to accommodate the Ministry of Defence Police (MOD Police) was provided locally in Bishopton. Two streets were built to provide housing for married police officers - Holmpark and Rossland Crescent. For unmarried police, hutted barrack-type accommodation was built adjacent to Holmpark. (Note: Originally this would have been the War Department Constabulary (WDC). An image, taken, in 1944 of this facility can be found on Trove.Scot .) The building was later used from the 1970s onwards as the MOD Police social club.

Some prefabricated houses were also built in Rossland Crescent, but these have since been demolished. Houses for essential staff, such as managers who needed to be on call, were provided on Poplar Avenue. Ingleston Drive may possibly have been built for ROF workers also. A hostel for single women workers was built in Oakshaw Street, Paisley, by the Ministry of Labour.

== Production ==
=== Cold War era rationalisation ===
Early in the 1960s, a Parliamentary working party recommended that propellants for the three branches of the armed services should be concentrated at ROF Bishopton; and the decision to close the Royal Naval Propellant Factory Caerwent (RNPF Caerwent) was announced on 25 March 1965, with a two-year rundown phase.

RNPF Caerwent had been producing the Gosling solid rocket booster for the Seaslug missile since 1955. The last Gosling motor was produced on 14 June 1966, and the remaining propellant charges, equipment and tooling was transferred to ROF Bishopston.

== Privatisation ==
The workforce fell from about 3,000 in the late 1970s to 2,000 in 1984, at the time of privatisation, when the majority of ROFs were vested in a new company, Royal Ordnance PLC, owned by the British Government. In 1987 the government approached a small number of companies seeking bids to buy Royal Ordnance. British Aerospace (BAe) become the successful bider. Royal Ordnance Plc become an operating division of BAe, known as "RO Defence". In the early 1990s, BAe bought and sold a number of other companies, including defence companies, one being the German firearms manufacturer Heckler & Koch, which was merged into RO Defence.

During the 1990s, significant investment was made to the site, automating its nitroglycerin, nitrocellulose and nitroguanidine manufacturing plants, which improved manufacturing capabilities and process safety. Prior to its closure the site was producing gun and rocket propellant for use in numerous weapons systems. The workforce was about 1,000 in 1991 and was reduced to about 600 in 1993. There was a further reduction in 1996 to 450 employees as the business tried to reduce costs. It was announced in 1998 that the site would close after the loss of a major government contract for the supply of 155mm ammunition to the South African defence contractor, Denel. Manufacture on the site ceased in June 2002.

The MOD Fire Service moved out after privatisation; and the MOD Police moved out after the sale to British Aerospace. Their former social club at Holmpark, with its adjoining sports field, became part of facilities of Bishopton village. The former MOD Police houses at both Holmpark and Rossland Crescent were, however, retained by the Ministry of Defence and were sold off in the mid-1980s to private buyers. As they were still connected to ROF Bishopton's sewage system and water supply they had to be connected to the public systems before they could be sold.

BAE Systems is the current owner of the site. They house a small Environmental Test Facility and Gun Propulsion laboratory at Bishopton. The rest of the ground is being developed into housing. The development is expected to include up to 4,000 new homes on a site named Dargavel Village. The site is being developed by a consortium of different private builders.

== Bibliography ==
- Cocroft, Wayne (2000). Dangerous Energy: The archaeology of gunpowder and military explosives manufacture. Swindon: English Heritage. ISBN 1-85074-718-0.
- Drysdale, Rev. William D. (1962). "Chapter 26:The Parish of Erskine". In Moisley, H. A.; Thain, A. G.; Somerville, A. C.; Stevenson, W. (eds.). The Counties of Renfrew & Bute. The Third Statistical Account of Scotland. Glasgow: Collins.
- Forsythe, R.N. (2005). "The railways of Royal Ordnance Bishopton". Backtrack. 19 (4): 248–250. ISSN 0955-5382.
- Hornby, William (1958). Factories and Plant. History of the Second World War: United Kingdom Civil Series. London: Her Majesty's Stationery Office and Longman, Green & Co.
