= Glasgow, Paisley and Greenock Railway =

Railway in Scotland

The Glasgow, Paisley and Greenock Railway (GP&GR) was an early Scottish railway, opened in 1841, providing train services between Greenock and Glasgow. At the time the River Clyde was not accessible to sea-going ships, and the intention was to compete with riverboats that brought goods to and from the city. In fact, passenger traffic proved surprisingly buoyant, and connecting steamer services to island resorts in the Firth of Clyde provided a very great source of business.

The GP&GR merged with the larger Caledonian Railway in 1851.

The Greenock station was not alongside the steamer berths and as the trade developed, this became a significant disadvantage. The independent Greenock and Wemyss Bay Railway built a branch line to a pier at Wemyss Bay, giving much closer access to Rothesay, and in 1889 the Greenock line itself was extended to Gourock. The work involved building Newton Street Tunnel, the longest railway tunnel in Scotland.

The line between Glasgow, Greenock, and Gourock is active today, as is its Wemyss Bay branch.

== History ==
=== Before the GP&GR ===
At the beginning of the nineteenth century, the City of Glasgow had long been growing in industrial and commercial importance. With that growth came the need for transport of manufactured goods and raw materials, and at first crude horse-operated tramways responded to that demand, particularly short lines built to convey minerals to waterways. The River Clyde itself was a major traffic artery, but difficult navigational problems made it impossible for large vessels to reach the city. Increasingly, sea-going ships berthed at Greenock, and goods were trans-shipped there to smaller boats that could navigate the Clyde. Passengers too changed at Greenock to reach the city.

Passenger traffic was heavy following the introduction of steam vessels: traffic density may be judged from the fact that in the years 1838 and 1839 there were 69 collisions on the river.

Greenock itself grew in importance; it had a harbour in 1710 and became a focus for international trade, and the town developed numerous industries, including shipbuilding, metalworking, sugar refining and hat making.

=== A railway proposed ===
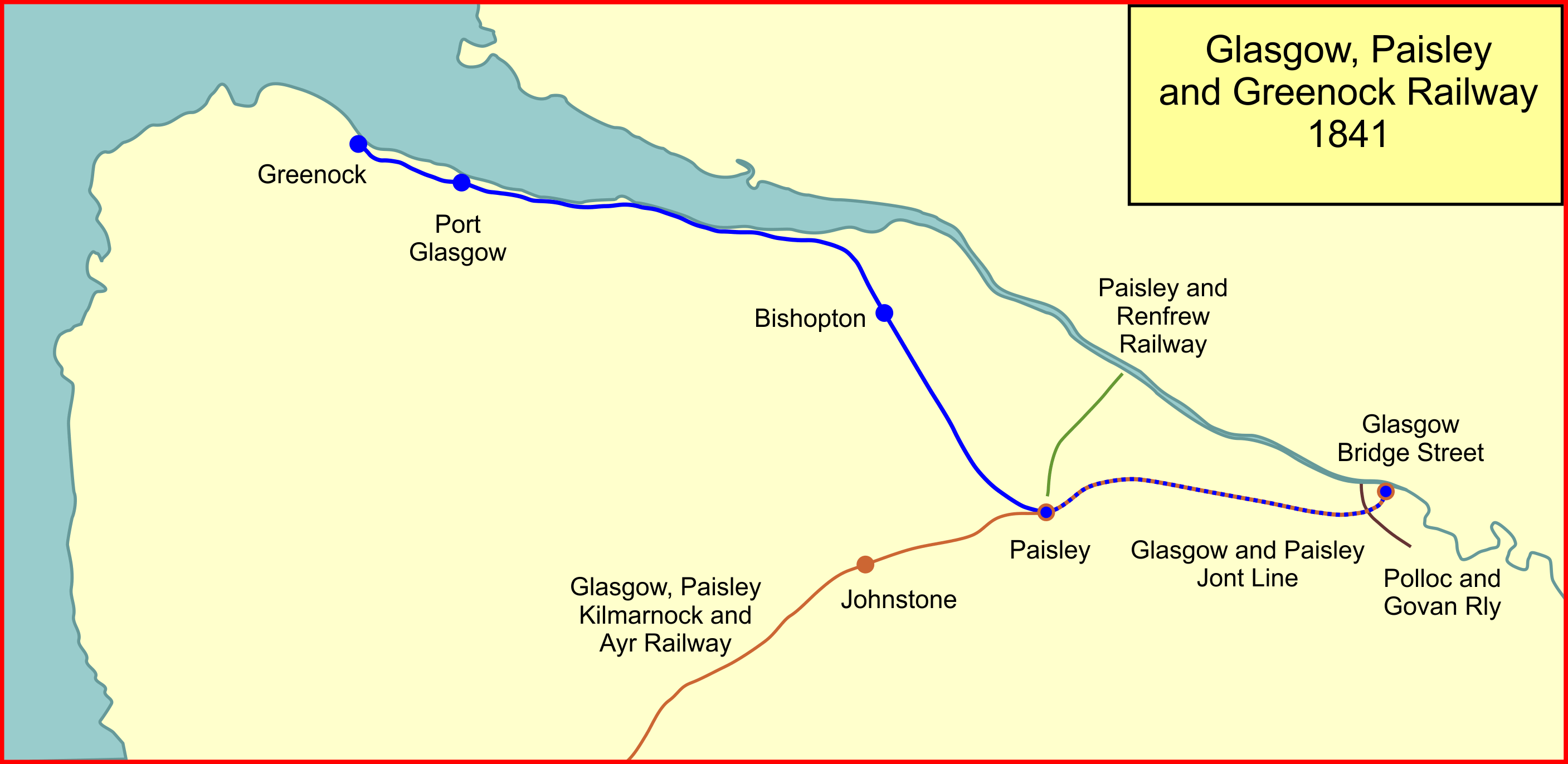
System map of the Glasgow, Paisley and Greenock Railway in 1841

The successful operation of the "coal railways" in the west of Scotland, notably the Monkland and Kirkintilloch Railway, encouraged thoughts of a railway between Greenock and Glasgow, and in 1836 these thoughts took the form of a prospectus for a company. This led to a parliamentary bill, but at the same time another proposed railway, the Glasgow, Paisley, Kilmarnock and Ayr Railway was being presented; the two lines would have very similar routes between Glasgow and Paisley, and it became plain that Parliament would be reluctant to authorise two adjacent lines; moreover the landowners would be hostile to the double loss of amenity. The respective promoters responded to this by agreeing on a jointly made and operated line between Glasgow and Paisley.

Land acquisition was a significant issue for the company. Houston station was built only because Lord Douglas made that the price of his withdrawing opposition to the bill, and although the company was pleased to have obtained all the necessary lands without legal sanction (except in one case), it paid 18.1% of its capital for land, compared with 12–13% for comparable lines. Its parliamentary costs were also much higher than for other lines.

Glasgow, Paisley and Greenock Railway Act 1837
- Act of Parliament
- Parliament of the United Kingdom
- Long title: An Act for making and maintaining a Railway from Glasgow to Greenock by Paisley and Port Glasgow, to be called "The Glasgow, Paisley, and Greenock Railway."
- Citation: 7 Will. 4 & 1 Vict. c. cxvi

Dates
- Royal assent: 15 July 1837

Text of statute as originally enacted

Both companies were authorised by acts of Parliament, the Glasgow, Paisley and Greenock Railway Act 1837 (7 Will. 4 & 1 Vict. c. cxvi) and the Glasgow, Paisley, Kilmarnock and Ayr Railway Act 1837 (7 Will. 4 & 1 Vict. c. cxvii), on 15 July 1837.

The Glasgow, Paisley and Ardrossan Canal had been authorised by the Glasgow, Paisley and Ardrossan Canal Act 1806 (46 Geo. 3. c. lxxv), but in fact was only built between Glasgow and Johnstone; Parliament wished to prevent partial construction of the new railways, and the authorising acts of Parliament required construction to be undertaken from both ends of the lines.

=== Construction and opening ===
The track gauge had not yet been decided; the coal railways already active in the west of Scotland used a gauge of 4 ft 6 in (1,372 mm) and for a time it was thought that this gauge would be adopted. At this stage, the design of the line was in the hands of Thomas Grainger who had been largely responsible for the coal railways. However much thought was being given by others to a line connecting Glasgow and the English railways. The line was to become the Caledonian Railway; trunk railways in England were already established and standard gauge was in general use there. The implications of a railway network were now understood, and the Greenock line decided to adopt standard gauge. The GPK&AR followed suit.

The first Secretary to the company appointed in 1837 was Captain Mark Huish; at that time he was new to railway management. He later went on to become the General Manager of the London and North Western Railway Company.

The contract for the first 7 miles (11 km) of the railway was agreed in 1839, the engineer being Joseph Locke supported by his partner John Errington; the contractor was Thomas Brassey. This was to be the first work of Locke in Scotland; and Brassey's fourth contract.

The GPK&AR was able to open to traffic on the joint section between a temporary terminus in Glasgow at Bridge Street and Paisley, for a demonstration run on 13 July 1840; it opened fully to the public the following day; the GPK&AR went on to extend towards Ayr in the following months. The GP&GR was unable to open at this stage, due to serious difficulties in forming the Bishopton tunnel and the rock cuttings approaching it, and it was not until 31 March 1841 that it was able to open.

The permanent Bridge Street station opened a week later, on 6 April 1841.

The section between Glasgow and Paisley was managed by a joint committee, of representatives of the GP&GR and GPK&AR; it was known as the Glasgow and Paisley Joint Railway: the section of line was jointly owned with the Glasgow, Paisley, Kilmarnock and Ayr Railway.

The construction had significantly overrun Grainger's estimates: he had quoted £393,000 and the company had exhausted its £666,666 of share and loan capital and had had to apply for powers for a further £200,000 in loans. Shareholders were critical of some of the contract arrangements, which appeared to be wasteful, if not corrupt.

=== First years of operation ===
On opening, the company had stations at Bridge Street in Glasgow and at Paisley (both on the Joint Section), Bishopton, Port Glasgow and Greenock. (Note: Butt and Cobb say that the Greenock station was called "Greenock Bridge Street"; Quick adds a question mark. There is, and was, no such thoroughfare in the area; and of course there was no need to specify. This may be confusion with sources referring to "the Greenock Railway's terminus at Bridge Street", referring of course to the Glasgow station. Paisley station was simply known as "Paisley"; the Paisley and Renfrew Railway already had a terminal in the town, but neither station needed a specifier. Paisley Station was renamed Paisley Gilmour Street in 1872.)

The 1850 Bradshaw timetable shows nine trains each way between "Glasgow, Paisley, and Greenock", with no tabular indication of running: the starting times only of the trains are shown. The first from Greenock started at 5.30 am (except on Mondays), or as soon thereafter as the arrival of the mail steamer from Belfast would allow.

The company paid a good dividend, an annualised equivalent of 4% was declared at the first half-yearly meeting in 1841, but this was before any actual operating income had come in. When actual receipts were known this quickly reduced and never exceeded 2% (annualised). At over 50% the ratio of operating costs to income was poor, and it emerged that a track maintenance contract had been let at first for £250 per mile to the managing director's nephew-in-law, while the GPK&AR paid about £85 per mile to an independent contractor.

=== Amalgamation with the Caledonian Railway ===
Caledonian and Glasgow, Paisley and Greenock Railways Amalgamation Act 1847
- Act of Parliament
- Parliament of the United Kingdom
- Long title: An Act to amalgamate the Glasgow, Paisley, and Greenock Railway with the Caledonian Railway, and to authorize the raising of additional Money by the said last-mentioned Company.
- Citation: 10 & 11 Vict. c. clxix

Dates
- Royal assent: 9 July 1847

Text of statute as originally enacted

For some time the alliance between the Caledonian Railway and the GP&GR was strong, and in 1847 the Caledonian obtained the Caledonian and Glasgow, Paisley and Greenock Railways Amalgamation Act 1847 (10 & 11 Vict. c. clxix) giving authority to absorb the Greenock line. This proved to be more contentious than it had appeared: the terms of share transfer were difficult as the GP&GR held out for guaranteed income, and as the Caledonian considered the financial situation of the Greenock company, it became alarmed at apparent financial impropriety in the company. The Caledonian's own finances were not strong, and the alarm increased with time, and on 6 May 1850 the Caledonian board decided to try to repeal the act of amalgamation.

In fact, this was not proceeded with, and in time the Caledonian relented, and on 26 May 1851 an amalgamation agreement was signed; it was enacted by Parliament in the Caledonian Railway Arrangements Act 1851 (14 & 15 Vict. c. cxxxiv) on 7 August 1851. The Caledonian paid an annuity to the shareholders of the former Greenock company.

=== Locomotives 1839 to 1848 ===
Glasgow, Paisley and Greenock Railway Locomotives 1839–1848
No	Name	Wheel Arrangement	Foundry	Built	Notes
1	Lucifer	2-2-0	Rothwell & Co	1839	Converted to 2-2-2
1	Lucifer	2-2-2	ex 2-2-0	1839	renamed 1841
1	Fireking	2-2-2	ex Lucifer	1839	ex Lucifer, Caledonian Railway No 77
2	Zamiel	2-2-0	Rothwell & Co	1839	Converted to 2-2-2 in 1841
2	Zamiel	2-2-2	ex 2-2-0	1839	Caledonian Railway No 67
3	Glasgow	2-2-0	Rothwell & Co	1839	Converted to 2-2-2 in 1841
3	Glasgow	2-2-2	ex 2-2-0	1839	renamed 1841
3	Hecate	2-2-2	ex Glasgow	1839	Caledonian Railway No 78
4	Eagle	2-2-2	Sharp Roberts & Co	1840	Caledonian Railway No 70
5	Falcon	2-2-2	Sharp Roberts & Co	1840	Caledonian Railway No 71
6	Petrel	2-2-2	Sharp Roberts & Co	1841	Caledonian Railway No 72
7	Curlew	2-2-2	Sharp Roberts & Co	1840	Caledonian Railway No 73
8	Hawk	2-2-2	Barr & McNab	1840	Scrapped 1844 (Acc)
9	Witch	2-2-2	Tayleur & Co	1840	Caledonian Railway No 65
10	Phantom	2-2-2	Tayleur & Co	1840	Caledonian Railway No 66
11	Greenock	2-2-2	Caird & Co	1840	Caledonian Railway No 68
12	Glasgow	2-2-2	Caird & Co	1840	Caledonian Railway No 69
13	Paisley	2-2-2	Tayleur & Co	1841	Caledonian Railway No 74
14	Clyde	2-2-2	Tayleur & Co	1841	Caledonian Railway No 75
15	Hercules	0-4-2	R & W Hawthorne & Co	1841	Caledonian Railway No 76
16	Willington	2-2-2	Sharp Roberts & Co	1842	Caledonian Railway No 79
17		2-2-2	Greenock	1846	Caledonian Railway No 1
18		2-2-2	Greenock	1846	Caledonian Railway No 2
19		2-2-2	Greenock	1846	Caledonian Railway No 3

=== Steamer connections ===
The passenger traffic on the line exceeded original estimates; a particular growth in traffic was passengers connecting with steamers at Greenock for the island resorts. Business people acquired residences on the islands and other Firth of Clyde locations, and in many cases travelled each weekend. The journey time was critical, and goods and parcels traffic for the steamers was required to be sent down by the previous train; passengers making the connection hurried through the streets of Greenock. The station faced Cathcart Street and the steamers berthed at Custom House Quay, a few minutes away.

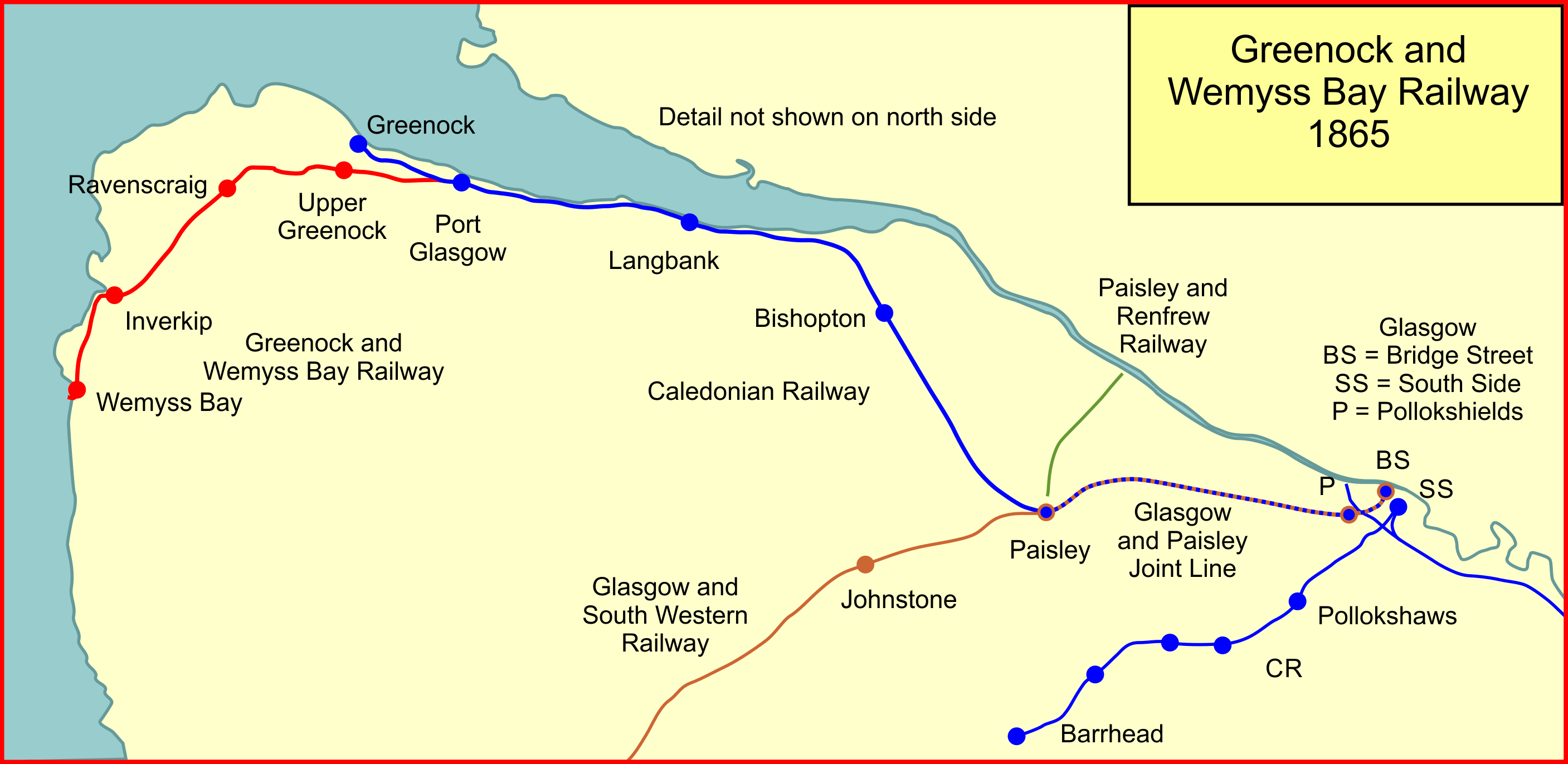
The Greenock and Wemyss Bay Railway in 1865

Rothesay became extremely popular as a resort, and as demand for journeys to and from the islands established, it was recognised that Greenock was not ideal in providing the railhead. A more suitable location was Wemyss Bay, where a pier giving closer access to Rothesay was available. The Greenock and Wemyss Bay Railway was formed, obtaining the Greenock and Wemyss Bay Railway Act 1862 (25 & 26 Vict. c. clx) giving authorisation on 17 July 1862. It left the Greenock line at Port Glasgow and skirted the southern margin of Greenock, climbing onto high ground before descending into Wemyss Bay. The line opened on 15 May 1865 and was worked by the Caledonian Railway. Although the Wemyss Bay company was friendly to the Caledonian, relations were sometimes strained; a joint committee oversaw the operation of the line.

The year 1865 saw a more ominous development when the Greenock and Ayrshire Railway (G&AR) was authorised. It was to join with the Glasgow and South Western Railway and would form a directly competing line for Glasgow to Greenock traffic. The Greenock and Ayrshire line opened to passenger traffic on 23 December 1869, after several weeks of running goods trains only. Its Greenock terminus was at Albert Harbour, and the trains ran directly to the berths. Immediately aggressive price competition started, resulting in impossibly cheap fares. The G&AR had an advantage throughout journey times to Firth of Clyde destinations and abstracted a large share of the business from the Caledonian. At that time both the Caledonian trains and the G&SWR trains were using Bridge Street station in Glasgow; that station became very congested.

The desperate competition for business, and duplication of steamer sailings, continued for some time, until in March 1871 a traffic pooling agreement was reached: the CR would receive 57.67% of traffic income.

The Wemyss Bay company now protested: it had not been involved in the pooling negotiations and it demanded a better share. The dispute went to arbitration, and the arbitrator's award went against the Caledonian Railway.

Now another player entered the field: the North British Railway opened a pier at Craigendoran, on the right bank of the Clyde, in 1882.

=== Extension to Gourock ===
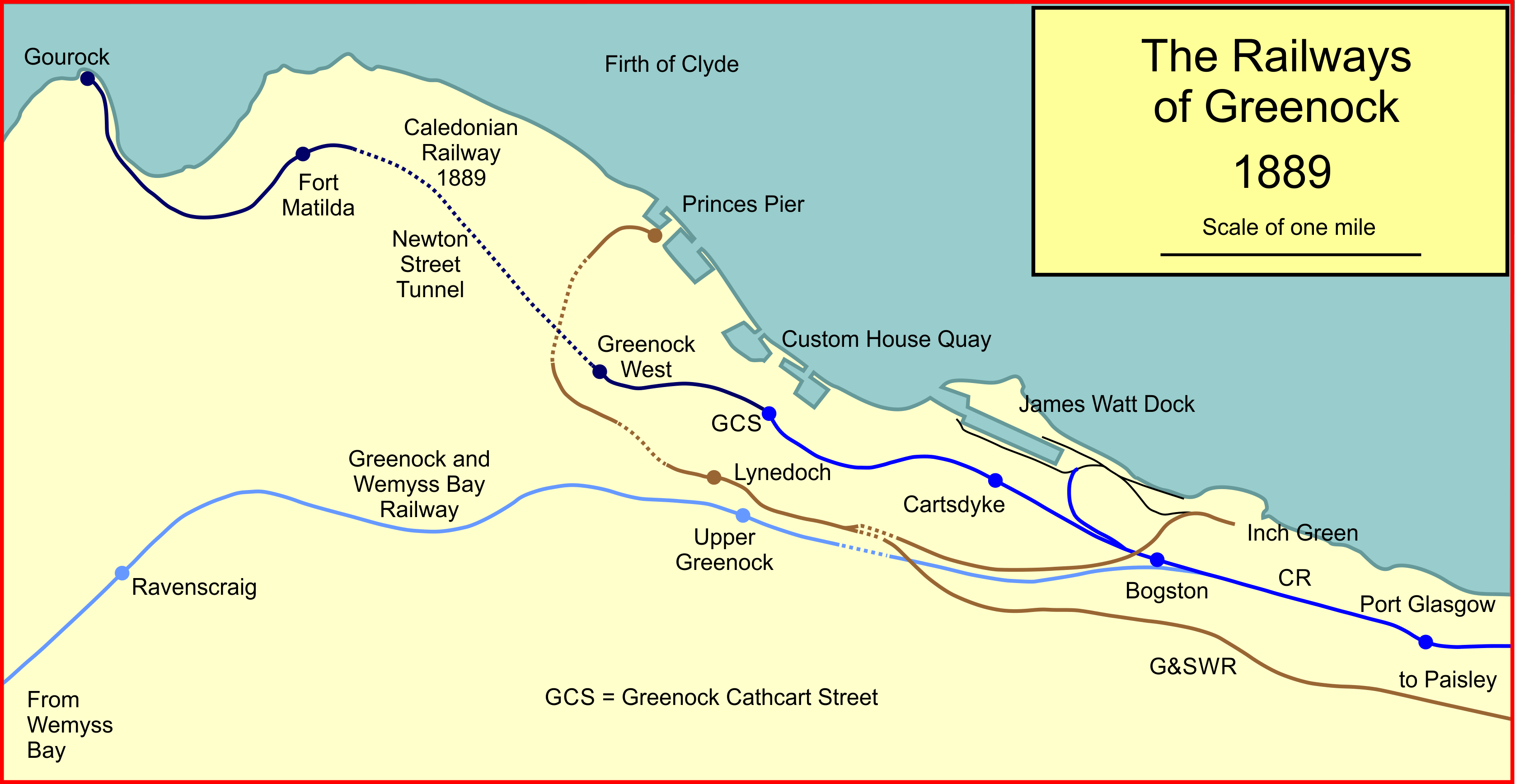
Railways of Greenock in 1889

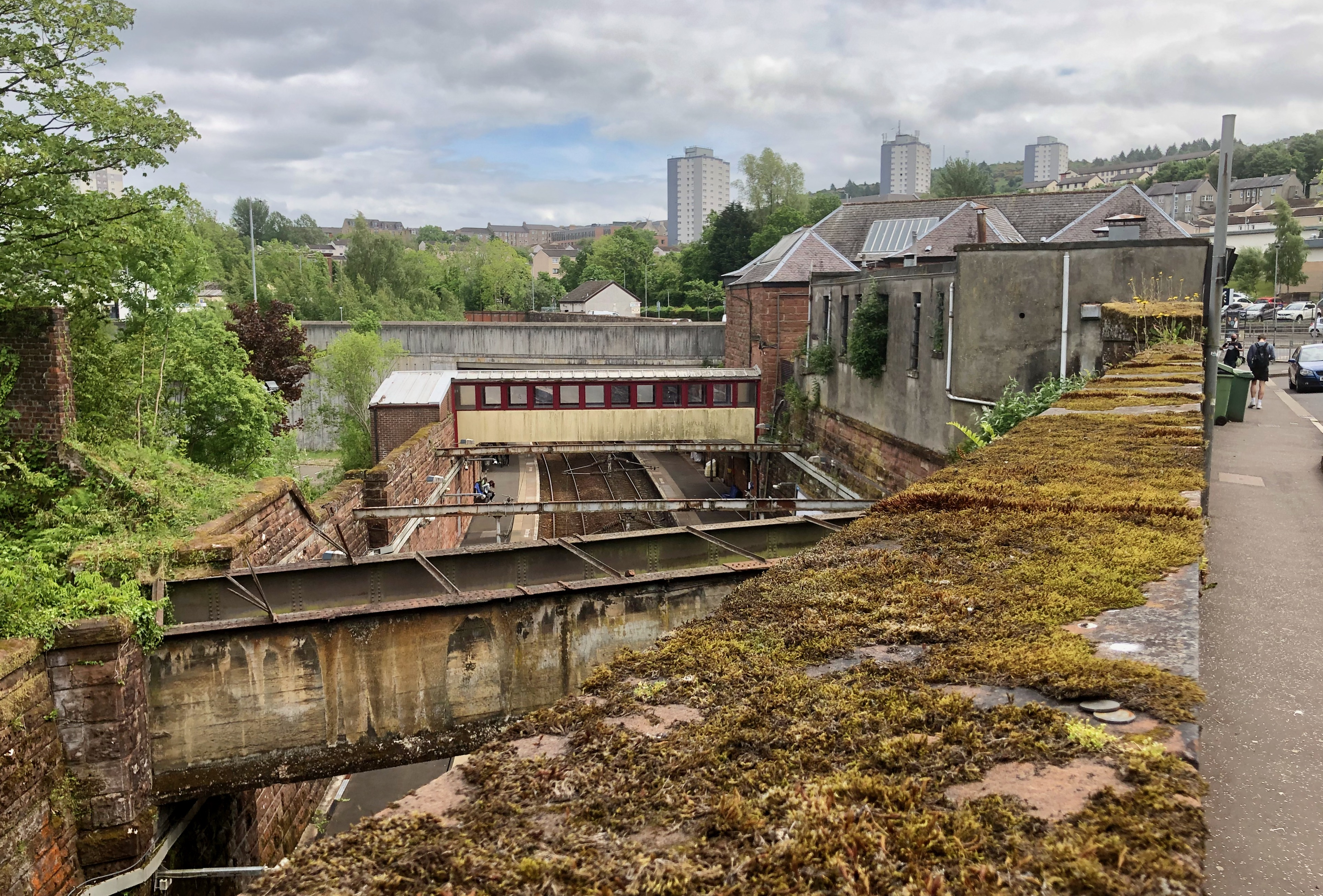
Greenock West railway station at junction between Inverkip Street and Newton Street

In 1841 the Greenock station in Cathcart Street had seemed perfect, but as the Clyde steamer trade developed, its location had become a disadvantage; relations with the Wemyss Bay company were often difficult. Gourock was only 3 miles (5 km) from Greenock by land but considerably more convenient for shipping.

In April 1865 the Greenock and Ayrshire Railway (G&AR) put a bill to Parliament for a line connecting the Glasgow and South Western Railway (G&SWR) to Greenock and its harbours. This met objections, and the Caledonian Railway made its own proposal for a branch from Cathcart Street in a tunnel under the Well Park, along the south side of Market Street and Tobago Street, then turning down the valley of the West Burn to the Albert Harbour. They later modified this to run a distance along Ardgowan Street in the west end before turning down to the harbour. The G&AR Bill was revised and gained approval in June, and the Caledonian Railway (Greenock and Gourock Extensions) Act 1866 (29 & 30 Vict. c. ccxlvi) was passed. After negotiations, the Caledonian abandoned their scheme in 1868, and in 1869 the G&AR opened their line which ran in a tunnel under west end streets down to its terminus as Albert Harbour railway station (later renamed Princes Pier). The G&AR merged with the G&SWR in 1872.

The two railway companies put forward rival proposals in November 1865 for a line to Gourock but met strong opposition from feuars of west-end properties. On 16 April 1866, the committee of the House of Commons decided in favour of the Caledonian option. In June 1869 the Caledonian agreed to buy the Gourock Harbour Company for £4,916 13s 4d. Various other proposals were made for a line to Gourock, and Gourock Town Council approved a proposal to use spoil from a railway tunnel to make a breakwater across Gourock Bay, forming a harbour. The Caledonian had ideas of making a transatlantic ocean terminal at Gourock, and in 1878 attempted to get parliamentary approval, but this was rejected.

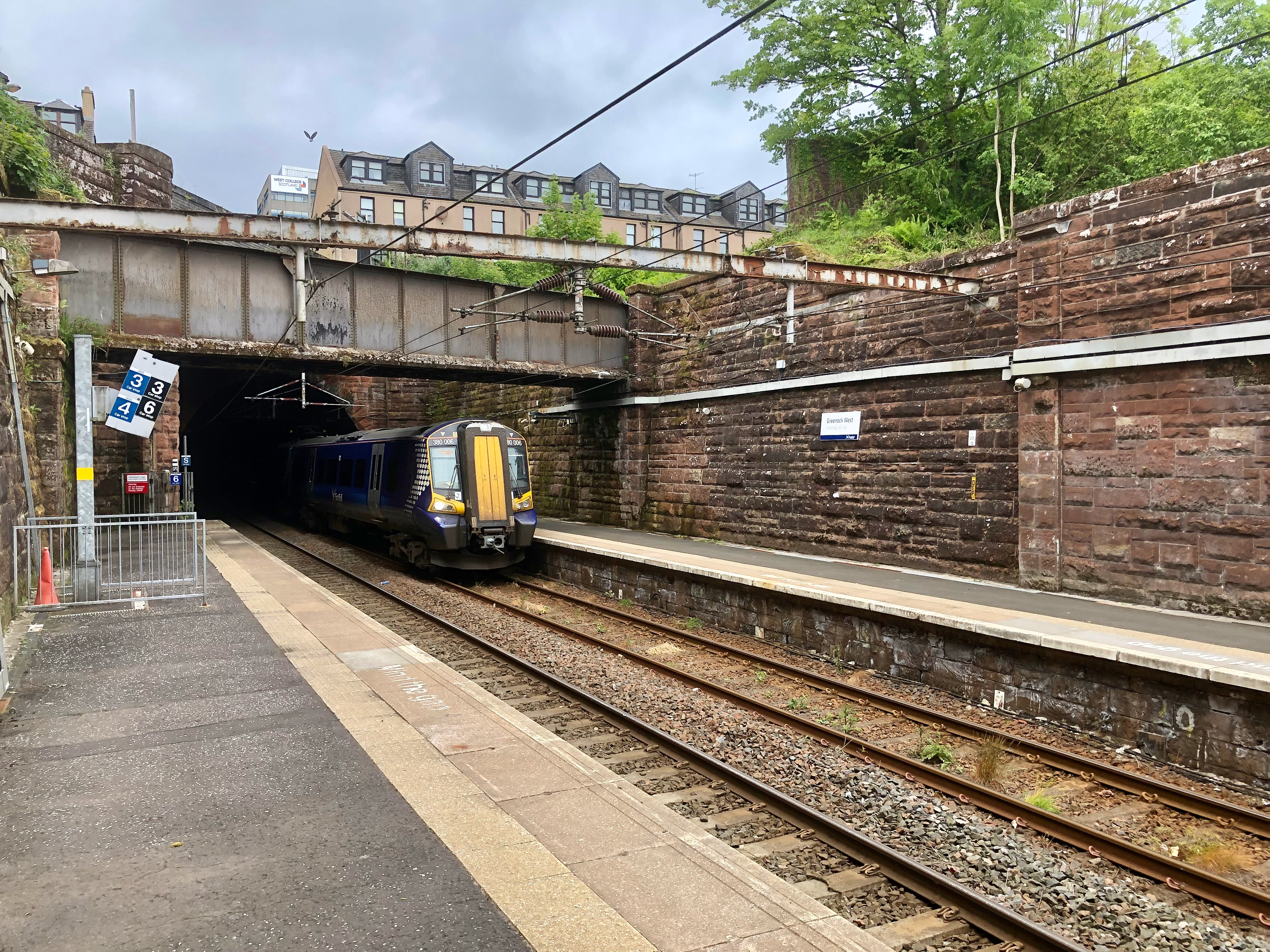
Train from Gourock emerging from Newton Street tunnel at Greenock West railway station.

The Caledonian Railway realigned its route to run beside the cemetery south of Greenock Royal Infirmary to the nearby junction between Inverkip Street and Newton Street, and was granted permission in September 1882 to build Greenock West station at that junction. From there, the Newton Street Tunnel was to be 1 mile 350 yards (1,930 m) long, the longest main line railway tunnel in Scotland.

In December 1883 both the G&SWR and the Caledonian Railway promoted competing bills for extending their respective railways to Gourock. The G&SWR proposed a branch from their tunnel under the junction of Ardgowan Street and Robertson Street. Greenock Council opposed openings to tunnels in the streets and objected to both. The Caledonian Railway's proposals for "Construction of Railway from Greenock to Gourock, with a Quay or Pier at Gourock" were included with other projects in The Caledonian Railway (No. 2) Bill. This cleared the House of Commons in April and was passed by Erskine May to the House of Lords, which gave authorisation on 28 July 1884, the bill becoming the Caledonian Railway (No. 2) Act 1884 (47 & 48 Vict. c. clxiii).

The whole project cost £600,000. Construction work began in 1885, the contractor was Hugh Kennedy & Son, Partick. Adjacent to the Cathcart Street station, the old Wester Greenock castle and Mansion House were demolished in 1886 before taking a tunnel under their grounds in Well Park. The line continued beside Market Street (now King Street), then via a short tunnel and deep cuttings to Greenock West station.

From there, work began on 11 March 1888 on the long tunnel which runs under the whole length of Newton Street, continues ahead under its junction with Lyle Road, then curves behind the Mariners Home to emerge at Drums Farm near Fort Matilda station. Tunnelling work employed thirty to forty men on each face, working day and night. Spoil from the tunnel and cuttings was used for landfill out from Gourock's Shore Street to the long new wooden wharf for steamboats which extended 0.5 miles (0.80 km) northwards on the west side of the bay, curving westward to the pierhead at Kempock Point. Gourock station was then built on the reclaimed ground on the inland side of the pier.

=== Caledonian Steam Packet Company ===
In 1888, with the completion of the railway anticipated in a year, the Caledonian Railway directors sought arrangements for steamer services from the new pier. They instructed the company's general manager James Thompson to write to all the private steamer owners requesting them to call at Gourock Pier, and offering facilities. Replies varied: while some ignored it, David MacBrayne offered to have the Ardrishaig steamer call at the pier. The directors decided to make their own arrangements, and the company applied for powers to own and operate its own steamships. In March 1889 this was rejected, following spirited opposition from the steamer operators themselves. The solution was the formation of a nominally independent company, the Caledonian Steam Packet Company (CSPC).

=== Opening of extension line, Gourock pier ===
The eastern section of the line was reported completed on 3 May 1889, and on 4 May a special train took Caledonian directors over the whole route to show them the progress of the work. The extension officially opened on 1 June 1889, with the first train departing Gourock at 05:25 taking workmen to Greenock and Port Glasgow, driven by the engineer Dugald Drummond who had designed and got built the Caledonian Railway 80 Class "Coast Bogies" for the route. The first arrival at Gourock with passengers from Glasgow at 07:20 met a "warm reception".

The station buildings were completed in 1890, as was the railway turntable at the south end of the pier.

The Wemyss Bay company once again took offence, for the Gourock steamer connection would deprive them of traffic. However, terms for the acquisition of the Wemyss Bay company by the Caledonian Railway were agreed upon in August 1889. Parliamentary authority was required for this, and there was some delay in obtaining it, but the two companies now acted in concert until the Caledonian Railway Act 1893 (56 & 57 Vict. c. clxxix) approving the acquisition was passed on 27 July 1893.

For some time this proved highly successful, but competition was fierce between the Caledonian (with the CSPC) via Gourock, the G&SWR via their impressive terminal at Greenock, Princes Pier, and the North British Railway via Craigendoran. The competition led to the triplication of services vying to provide the fastest transit from island resorts to the City.

Nock describes the scene in about 1893:

In the half hour following 4 p.m. the Glasgow terminal stations between them despatched no fewer than eleven boat trains, and with these trains were associated thirteen steamers! On the Caledonian no luggage at all was permitted at all on the Clyde boat expresses. When no more than 2 minutes was scheduled at Gourock between arrival of the train and departure of the boat one cannot be concerned with such trifles as luggage!… At the very height of the rivalry the Caledonian booked the 4.8 p.m. from Glasgow Central to run the 26.2 miles [42.2 km] to Gourock in 32 minutes. Although the line is on a fairly easy gradient the run was complicated buy the need to slow down at the junctions at Paisley, and again over the continuous curvature of the extension line from Greenock Central through Fort Matilda to Gourock.

=== Improved dock facilities at Greenock ===
The Burgh of Greenock went to considerable expense to ensure that its harbour facilities were kept up to date; in 1880 the harbour at Garvel on the eastern side of Greenock was further extended. It provided 3 miles (5 km) of quays with the most modern mechanical handling equipment. A new connection to dock lines was provided there from the Greenock line at Ladyburn, just west of Bogston station, where an engine shed was also provided.

=== The twentieth century ===
After 1900, the carriage of goods assumed increased importance, and the Burgh of Greenock particularly expended considerable effort in improving dock facilities. The grouping of the railways under the Railways Act 1921 consolidated the Caledonian interest with the G&SWR, although relatively limited rationalisation took place. After World War II there was a brief resurgence of the holidaymaking spirit of a sail doon the watter but changing social habits brought this to a serious decline in the 1960s, and at length, the steamer connection was distanced from railway operation.

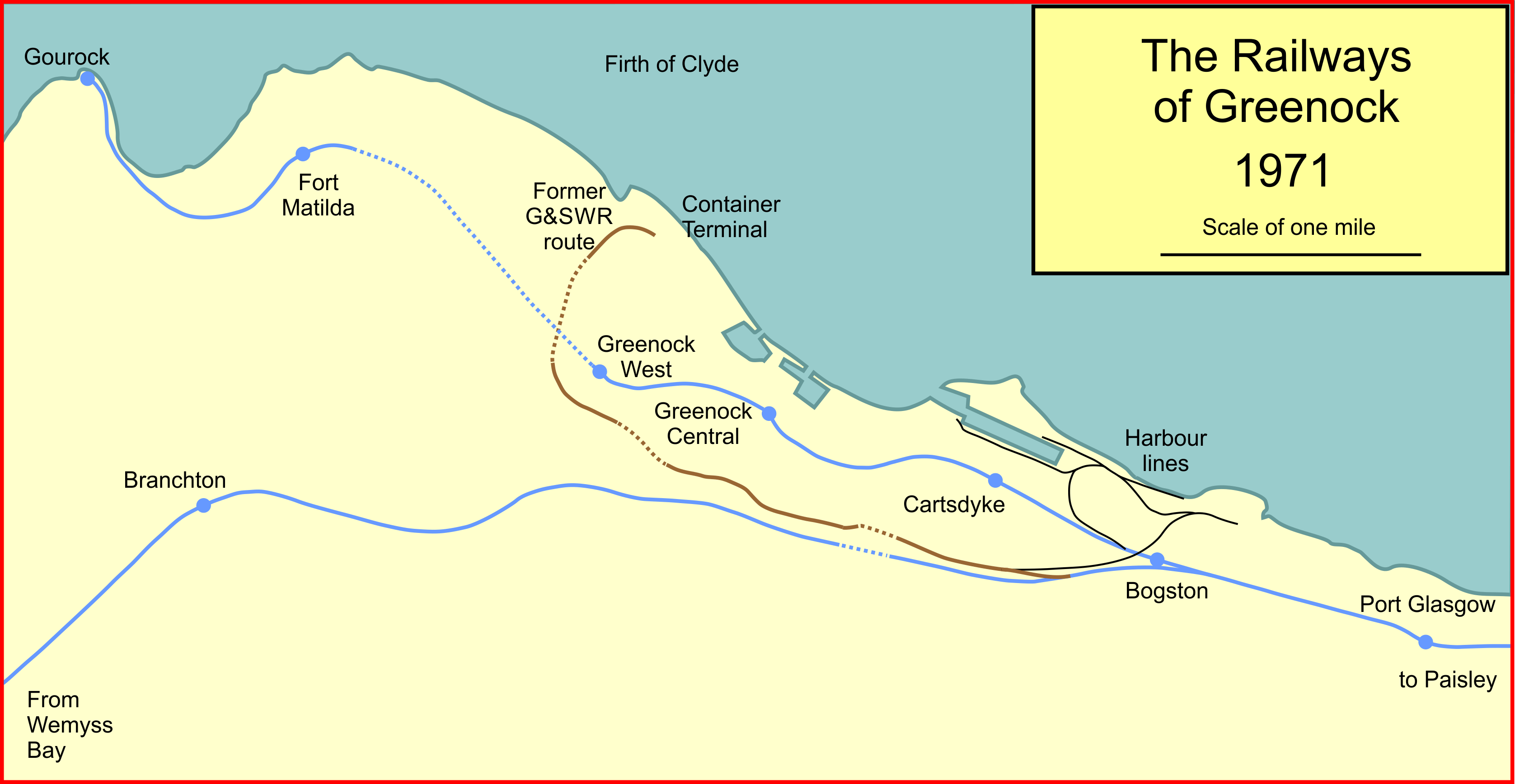
The railways of Greenock in 1971

In the early 1960s electrification of suburban routes around Glasgow was being implemented, on the 25 kV AC overhead system. After several routes had been electrified, in October 1964 the Gourock and Wemyss Bay lines were authorised for treatment. The Glasgow and Paisley Joint Line was quadruple track but was reduced to double track as part of the work, and the Wemyss Bay branch was to be partly singled. The track bed in Newton Street Tunnel was lowered to provide electrification clearances. 19 three-car units were ordered for the services, from Cravens, part of the Metro Cammell group; the units became class 311.

A partial service to Gourock started on 5 June 1967, with a fully electric passenger service from 5 September 1967.

== Chronology ==
The Glasgow, Paisley and Greenock Railway opened between Bridge Street station in Glasgow and Greenock on 31 March 1841; it amalgamated with the Caledonian Railway on 7 August 1851.

The independent Greenock and Wemyss Bay Railway opened on 15 May 1865; it was absorbed by the Caledonian Railway on 27 July 1893.

The extension to Gourock opened on 1 June 1889.

The route was electrified in 1967.

The line between Greenock West and Gourock was closed for tunnel repairs from 5 February 1973 to 20 April 1973, and again from 3 October 1993 to 27 March 1995.

== Topography ==
Paisley to Gourock; the details of the Glasgow and Paisley Joint Railway are given in that article.

Stations open at the present day are shown in bold; locations that were not passenger stations are shown in italics.

- Paisley; Glasgow and Paisley Joint Railway station, and junction with the Glasgow, Paisley, Kilmarnock and Ayr Railway; later renamed **Paisley Gilmour Street**;
- **Paisley St James**; opened December 1882;
- Houston; renamed Georgetown 1926; closed 2 February 1959;
- **Bishopton**;
- Bishopton Tunnel;
- **Langbank**; opened by July 1848; may have been called Lang Bank originally;
- **Woodhall**; opened 1 October 1945; Woodhall Halt initially;
- **Port Glasgow**;
- Wemyss Bay Junction; for Wemyss Bay branch;
- **Bogston**; opened September 1878; closed 1 January 1917; re-opened 1 March 1917;
- Ladyburn; engine shed and connection to Garvel dock area;
- **Cartsdyke**; opened July 1870;
- Greenock; relocated adjacent as Greenock Cathcart Street 1 June 1889; renamed **Greenock Central** 1898;
- **Greenock West**;
- **Fort Matilda**;
- **Gourock**.

== Current operations ==
Today, this line together with the former Greenock and Wemyss Bay Railway is fully operational as the Inverclyde Line, operated by ScotRail. There are typically three trains an hour on the line, one of which is semi-fast. One train per hour runs from Glasgow to Wemyss Bay.

== Connections to other lines ==
- Glasgow, Paisley, Kilmarnock and Ayr Railway at Paisley Gilmour Street
- Paisley and Barrhead District Railway at Paisley St James
- Greenock and Wemyss Bay Railway at Port Glasgow

== Sources ==
- Bradshaw, George (2012) [March 1850]. Bradshaw's Rail Times for Great Britain and Ireland March 1850: A reprint of the classic timetable complete with period advertisements and shipping connections to all parts. Midhurst: Middleton Press. ISBN 9781908174130.
- Gillham, John C. (1988). The Age of the Electric Train: Electric Trains in Britain since 1883. London: Ian Allan Ltd. ISBN 0-7110-1392-6.
- Gourvish, Terry (1972). Mark Huish and the London and North Western Railway, A Study of Management. Leicester: Leicester University Press.
- Helps, Arthur (2006) [1872]. The Life and Works of Mr Brassey. Republished by Nonsuch. ISBN 1-84588-011-0.
- McCrorie, Ian (1989). To The Coast. Fairlie, Ayrshire: Fairlie Press. ISBN 1-8712-0901-3.
- Monteith, Joy; MacDougall, Sandra (1981). Gourock, Inverkip and Wemyss Bay. Greenock: Inverclyde District Libraries. ISBN 0-9500687-2-1.
- Monteith, Joy (2004). Old Greenock. Catrine, Ayrshire: Stenlake Publishing. ISBN 978-1-84033-314-5.
- Nock, O. S. (1961). The Caledonian Railway. London: Ian Allan Limited.
- Paterson, Alan (2001). The Victorian summer of the Clyde steamers (1864-1888). Edinburgh: John Donald. ISBN 978-0-85976-550-3. OCLC 51991825.
- Paterson, Alan (2001). The golden years of the Clyde steamers (1889-1914). Edinburgh: Birlinn. ISBN 978-0-85976-551-0. OCLC 51669373.
- Quick, Michael (2022) [2001]. Railway passenger stations in Great Britain: a chronology (PDF). version 5.04. Railway & Canal Historical Society. Archived from the original (PDF) on 25 November 2022.
- Robertson, C.J.A. (1983). The Origins of the Scottish Railway System: 1722-1844. Edinburgh: John Donald. ISBN 0-85976-088-X.
- Ross, David (2013). The Caledonian—Scotland's Imperial Railway—A History. Catrine: Stenlake Publishing Ltd. ISBN 978 184 033 5842.
- Ross, David (2014). The Glasgow and South Western Railway: A History. Catrine: Stenlake Publishing Limited. ISBN 978 1 84033 648 1.
- Smith, R.M. (1921). The History of Greenock. Greenock: Orr, Pollock & Co. Archived from the original on 3 June 2021. (Inverclyde Council website)
- Thomas, John (1971). A Regional History of the Railways of Great Britain. Volume 6 Scotland: The Lowlands and the Borders. Newton Abbott: David & Charles. ISBN 0-7153-5408-6.
- Thomas, John; Paterson, Rev A. J. S. (1984). A Regional History of the Railways of Great Britain. Vol. VI Scotland: The Lowlands and the Borders (2nd ed.). Newton Abbott, Devon: David & Charles. ISBN 0-9465-3712-7. OCLC 12521072.
- Webster, N.W. (1970). Joseph Locke: Railway Revolutionary. London: George Allen & Unwin Ltd. ISBN 0-04-385055-3.
- Weir, Daniel (1829). History of the Town of Greenock. Glasgow: Robertson and Atkinson.
