= Tom Taylor (Yorkshire cricketer) =

English cricketer

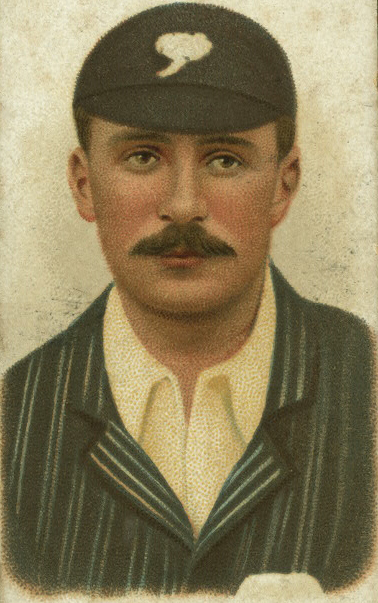
- Tom Taylor depiction from 1901 cigarette card

Personal information
- Full name: Tom Lancelot Taylor
- Born: 25 May 1878; Headingley, Leeds, Yorkshire, England
- Died: 16 March 1960 (aged 81); Leeds, Yorkshire, England
- Batting: Right-handed
- Role: Batsman, occasional wicket-keeper

Domestic team information
- Years: Team
- 1897–1900: Cambridge University
- 1899–1906: Yorkshire

Career statistics
Competition	First-class
Matches	130
Runs scored	5,968
Batting average	32.08
100s/50s	13/33
Top score	156
Catches/stumpings	86/6
- Source: CricketArchive, 13 April 2023

Tom Lancelot Taylor (25 May 1878 – 16 March 1960) was an English amateur cricketer, who played for Yorkshire County Cricket Club – Yorkshire CCC – during its successful period under Lord Hawke between 1900 and 1902. Taylor was a noted amateur batsman, who retired early - after the 1902 season - as he needed to devote his time to his engineering business Chairman & Managing Director of Taylor Brothers & Co. Ltd., Director of Metropolitan Cammell Carriage Wagon and Finance Company Ltd and of English Steel Corporation and Barnbow munitions factory, Chairman of the Yorkshire Conservative Newspaper Company Limited and to public life; e.g. as Chairman of the Leeds Infirmary.

Having been heralded as one of the five best cricketers of the 1900 season by Wisdon, it is likely that Taylor would have received England honours had he been able to keep up the game, for he was chosen as 12th man in the rain-ruined Lord's Test match in 1902. Taylor was a fleet-footed and extremely sound middle order batsman, who was especially strong against slow bowling on the many difficult pitches experienced in Yorkshire. Against fast bowling he was not as certain.

== Life and career ==
Tom Lancelot Taylor was born in Headingley, Leeds, Yorkshire, England on 25 May 1878.

Taylor began his career as a batsman and wicket-keeper for Uppingham School and his 100 not out against Repton in 1896 gave him a reputation as the best public school batsman in England at the time – a claim amply justified by his average of 84 that year. The following year he went up to Trinity College, Cambridge. Although he played only one match for Cambridge University in 1898, the following year he played regularly, but was disappointing considering his school reputation and was played for his wicket-keeping, which was never required when he joined Yorkshire.

It was his century against the Australians in 1899 that made critics note Taylor's talent, and the following year, in his last year at University, he did so well for Yorkshire that he was named as a Cricketer of the Year by Wisden, reaching 1,000 runs for the first time and playing for The Gentlemen at North Marine Road Ground, Scarborough. The following year, Taylor established himself as one of Yorkshire's best batsmen, with 44 on a treacherous wicket at Leyton Cricket Ground (where no other batsman reached 15) showing him one of the best batsmen on a bad wicket.

In 1902, Taylor batted so well on a succession of difficult pitches that he scored 1,567 runs, including a century for the Gentlemen at Scarborough, and superb innings against Derbyshire and Leicestershire on soft pitches. He was Yorkshire's leading batsman that season, and toured Australia and New Zealand that winter with Lord Hawke's XI, when he was also one of the most successful batsmen. However, after the tour Taylor stayed in Japan during 1903. Yorkshire's batting in that summer really showed what Taylor meant to them on soft or treacherous pitches, and, when he returned to England in 1904, he devoted so much time to his engineering business that he could never spare any time for three-day cricket apart from July and August 1906. His lack of practice clearly showed in thirteen matches played in those months: his average was a modest 21.00 and he only twice reached fifty. Yet, there is little doubt Taylor would still have been of value to Yorkshire could he have spared some time for cricket, especially in wet summers.

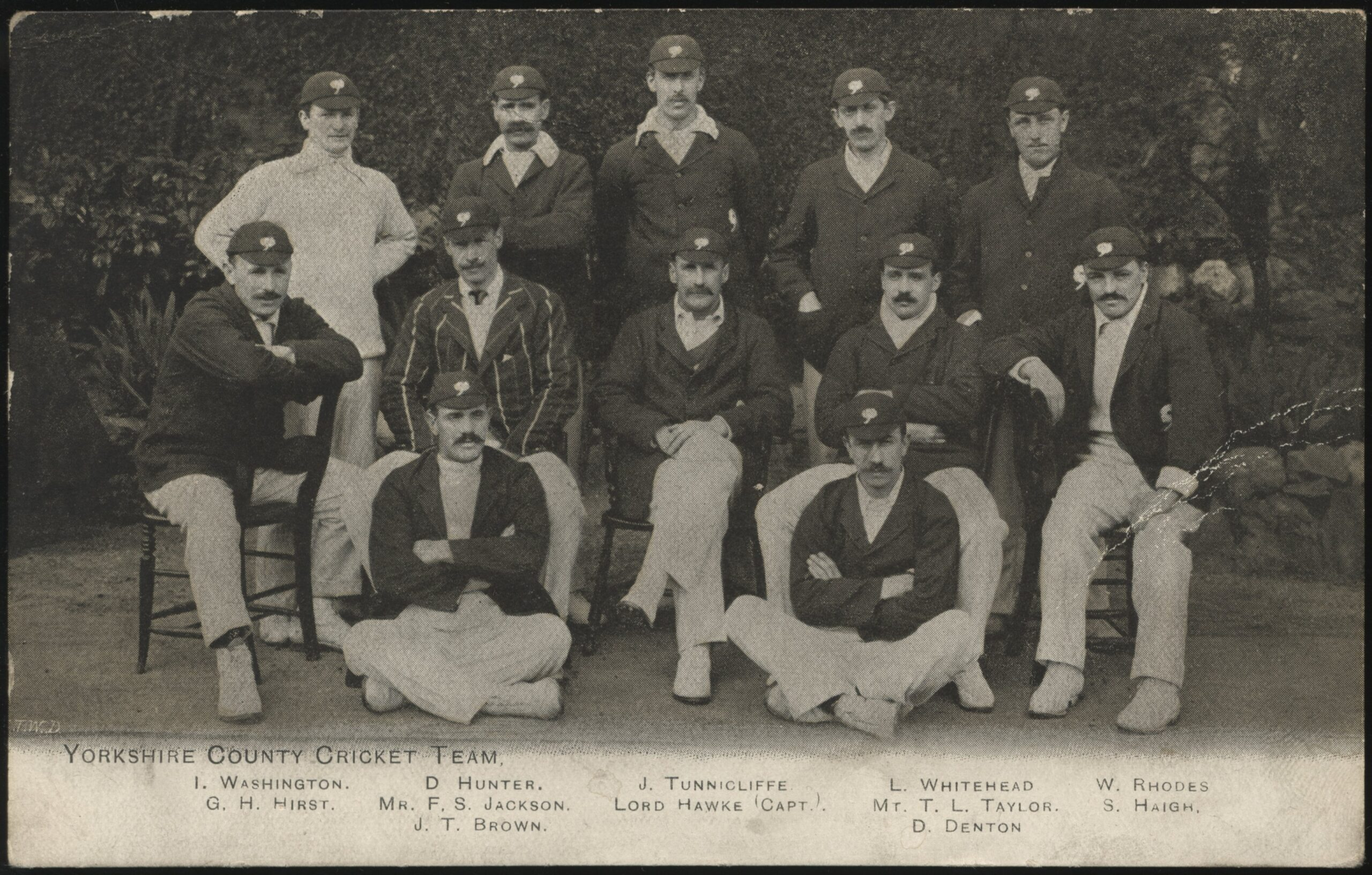
c. 1903–1905 – Yorkshire County Cricket Team – T. L. Taylor, middle row, 2nd from right

By 1908, Taylor had purchased the Gledhow Grange-Hawkhills Estate, near Leeds from the Middleton family to whom he was related; Taylor's mother Georgiana Howe had married ironmaster Thomas Albert Oakes Taylor of Buckingham house, Headingley in 1872. Her sister was Mary Ann Middleton (m 1874 née Howe) whose son was Robert Carrington Middleton (1875–1916) of Gledhow Lodge (Lidgett lane), another sister Catherine Howe, married Robert Carrington's uncle Edwin Middleton (1840–1892) in 1870. In June 1916, Taylor was a chief mourner at the funeral of his first cousin Robert Carrington Middleton who had studied engineering at Victoria University, Leeds and had been a Sergeant with Leeds Special Constabulary. Taylor and Middleton competed together in lawn tennis. His nephew was British Honduran governor Sir Colin Thornley.

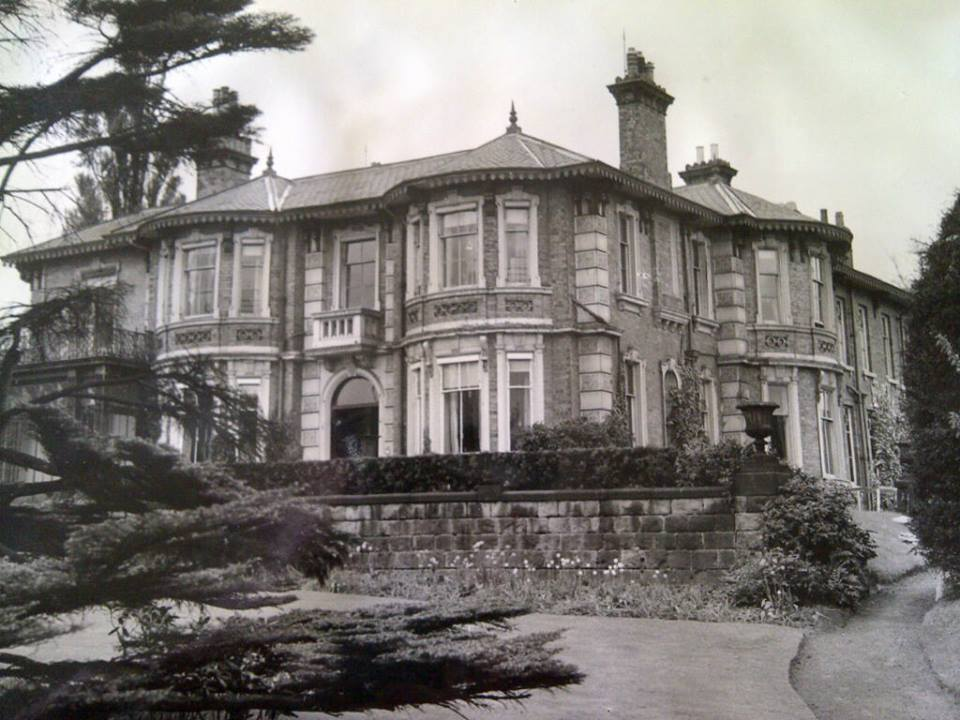
Hawkhills Estate, 1874

In 1927, Taylor was granted life membership by the Yorkshire club along with Stanley Jackson. In 1931, the Yorkshire County first cricket team players accepted an invitation to play against Captain Worsley's eleven at Hovingham Hall. Worsley succeeded Taylor as President of Yorkshire CCC in 1960. In 1947, Taylor had succeeded Jackson as President of Yorkshire County Cricket Club, and held office till his death in Leeds in 1960. Besides his cricketing and tennis ability, Taylor also played field hockey, captaining the Cambridge University team.

Recalling their time together as Yorkshire CCC players, in 1930 Wilfred Rhodes wrote that 'Taylor's batting had been invaluable to us'. Taylor himself wrote the foreword to A History Of Yorkshire County Cricket which was published in 1950 by the Yorkshire County Cricket Club of which Taylor was president at that time.

=== Public life ===
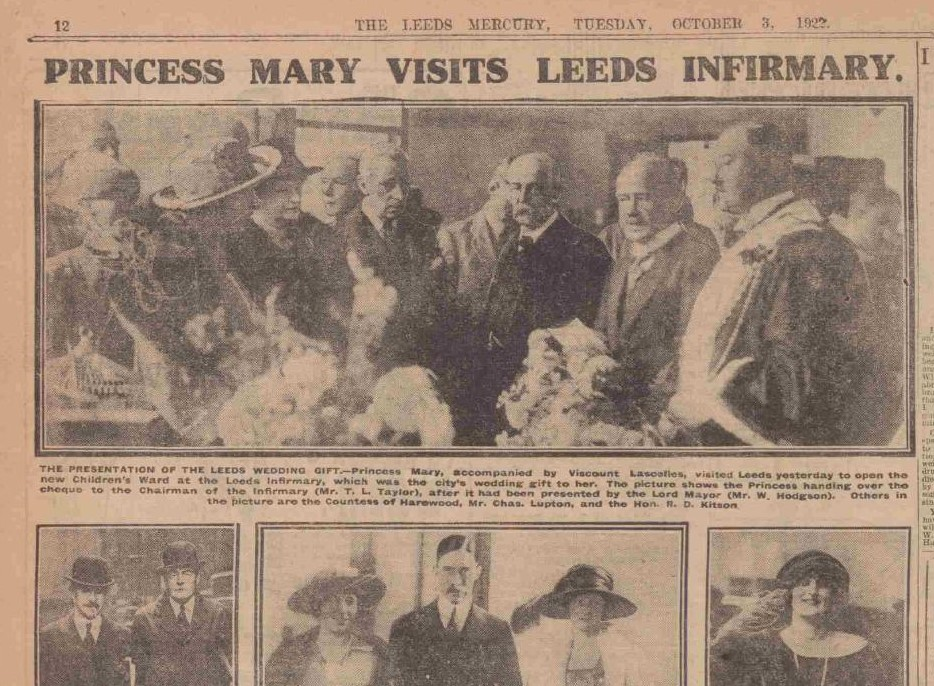
1922 – Leeds General Infirmary – Taylor is third from right with Princess Mary far left with hat, holding bouquet).

In 1922 Taylor was photographed alongside Princess Mary as chairman of the Board of Leeds General Infirmary. In 1925, he was Chairman of its Nurses Committee. Taylor's first cousin Henry Dubs Middleton (1880–1932) was Chairman of the Leeds Infirmary from 1928 to 1932.

=== Family ===
Taylor married Ethelwynne Rose Parkes, sister of cricketer Howard Parkes on January 14, 1908.

- Marjorie Rose Taylor (1910–2008) Married Robert Evelyn Gurney Mayhew, son of John Mayhew.
  - Sarah Elizabeth Mayhew, married Don Angelo Gennaro Granito Pignatelli di Belmonte (the 13th Prince of Belmonte) in 1969.
    - Donna Maria-Sofia Giovanna Rose Granito Pignatelli di Belmonte (born 11 March 1974) – married the Hon. Adam Robert Bruce, son of Andrew Bruce 11th Earl of Elgin on 17 May 2003.

== Bibliography ==
- Hodgson, Derek (1989). The Official History of Yorkshire County Cricket Club. Ramsbury, Marlborough, Wiltshire: The Crowood Press. ISBN 1-85223-274-9.
- Kilburn, J. M. (1970). A History of Yorkshire Cricket. Stanley Paul. ISBN 0-09-101110-8.
- Woodhouse, Anthony (1989). The History of Yorkshire County Cricket Club. London: Christopher Helm. ISBN 0-7470-3408-7.
