= Scotch marine boiler =

Design of steam boiler best known for its use on ships

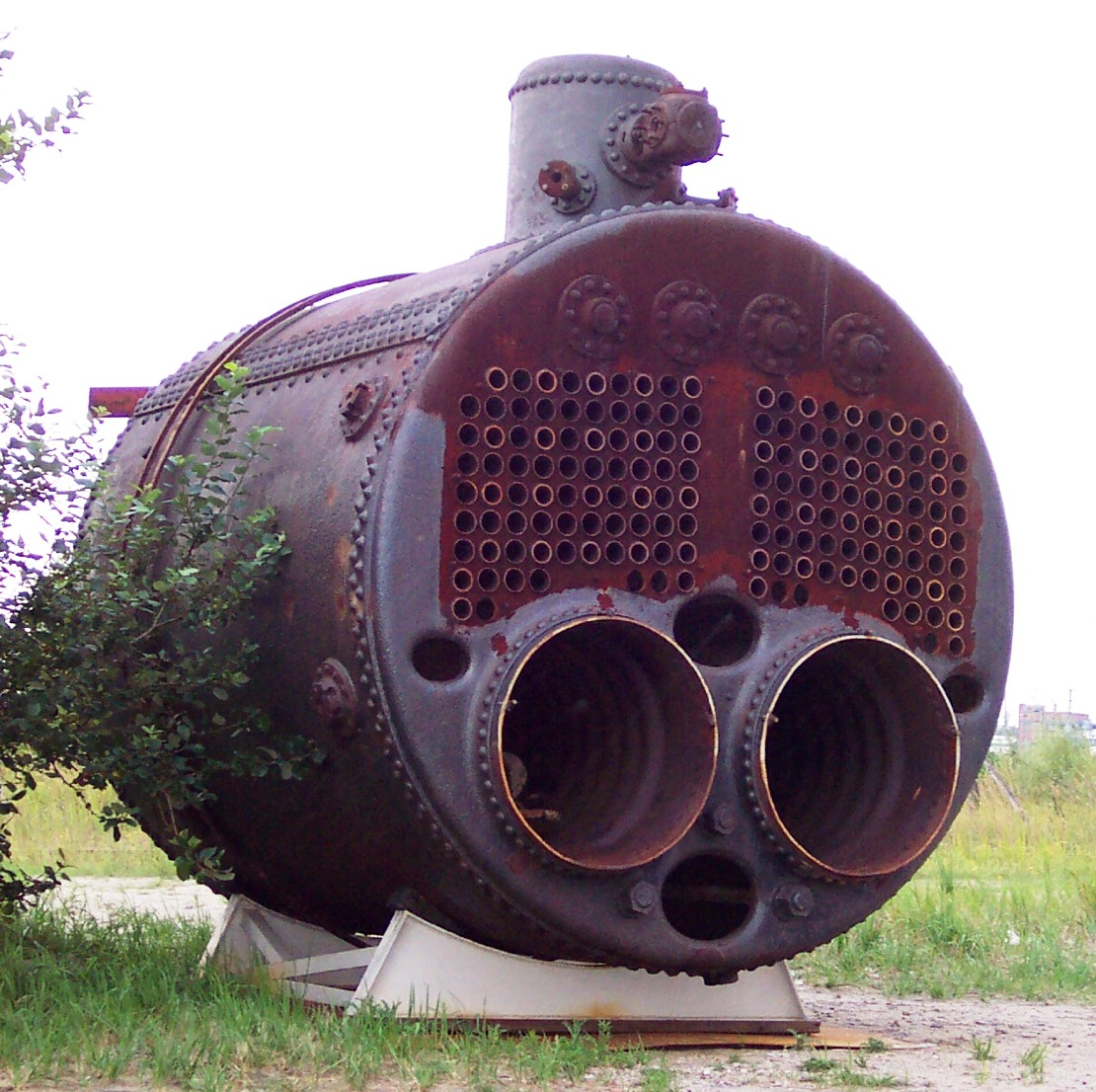
German example. Note the steam dome, a typically German feature, and also the corrugated furnaces.

A "Scotch" marine boiler (or simply Scotch boiler) is a design of steam boiler best known for its use on ships.

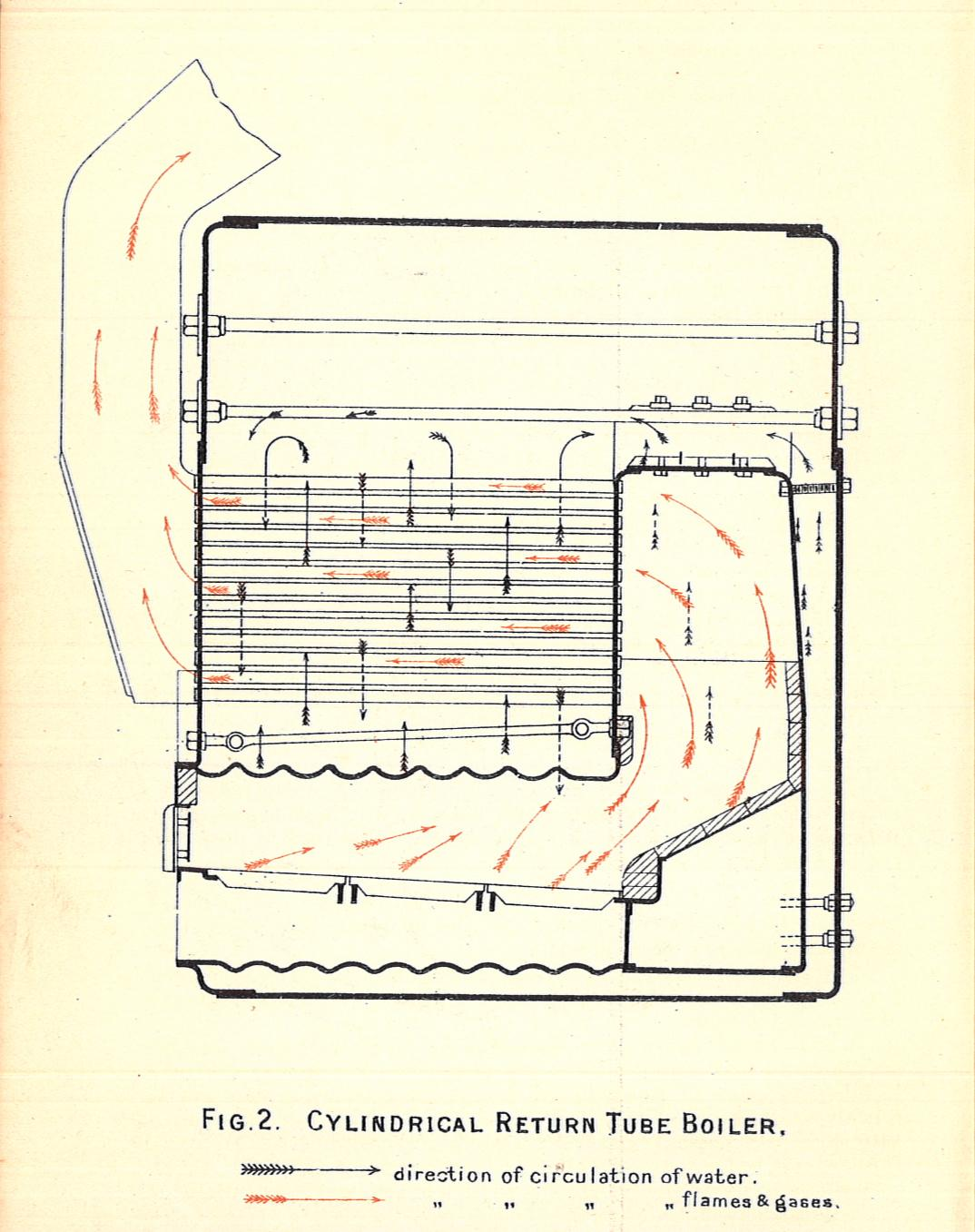
Sectional diagram of a "wet back" boiler

The general layout is that of a short horizontal cylinder. One or more large cylindrical furnaces are in the lower part of the boiler shell. Above this are many small-diameter fire-tubes. Gases and smoke from the furnace pass to the back of the boiler, and then return through the small tubes and up and out of the chimney. The ends of these multiple tubes are capped by a smokebox, outside the boiler shell.

The Scotch boiler is a fire-tube boiler, in that hot flue gases pass through tubes set within a tank of water. As such, it is a descendant of the earlier Lancashire boiler, and like the Lancashire it uses multiple separate furnaces to give greater heating area for a given furnace capacity. It differs from the Lancashire in two respects: many small-diameter tubes (typically 3 or 4 inches [75 or 100 mm] diameter each) are used to increase the ratio of heating area to cross-section. Secondly, the overall length of the boiler is halved by folding the gas path back on itself.

== Combustion chamber ==
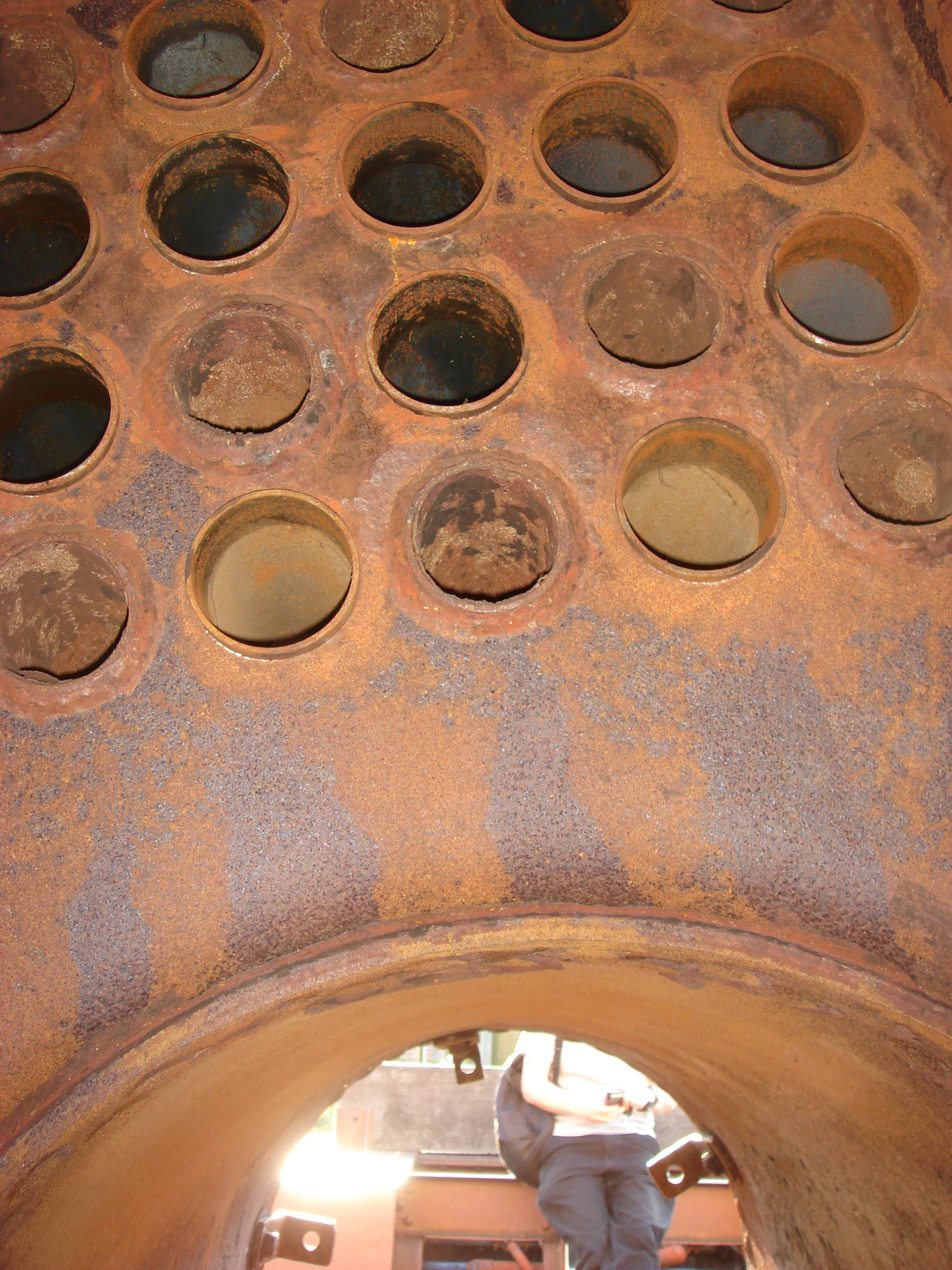
Inside the combustion chamber, looking up at the tubeplate

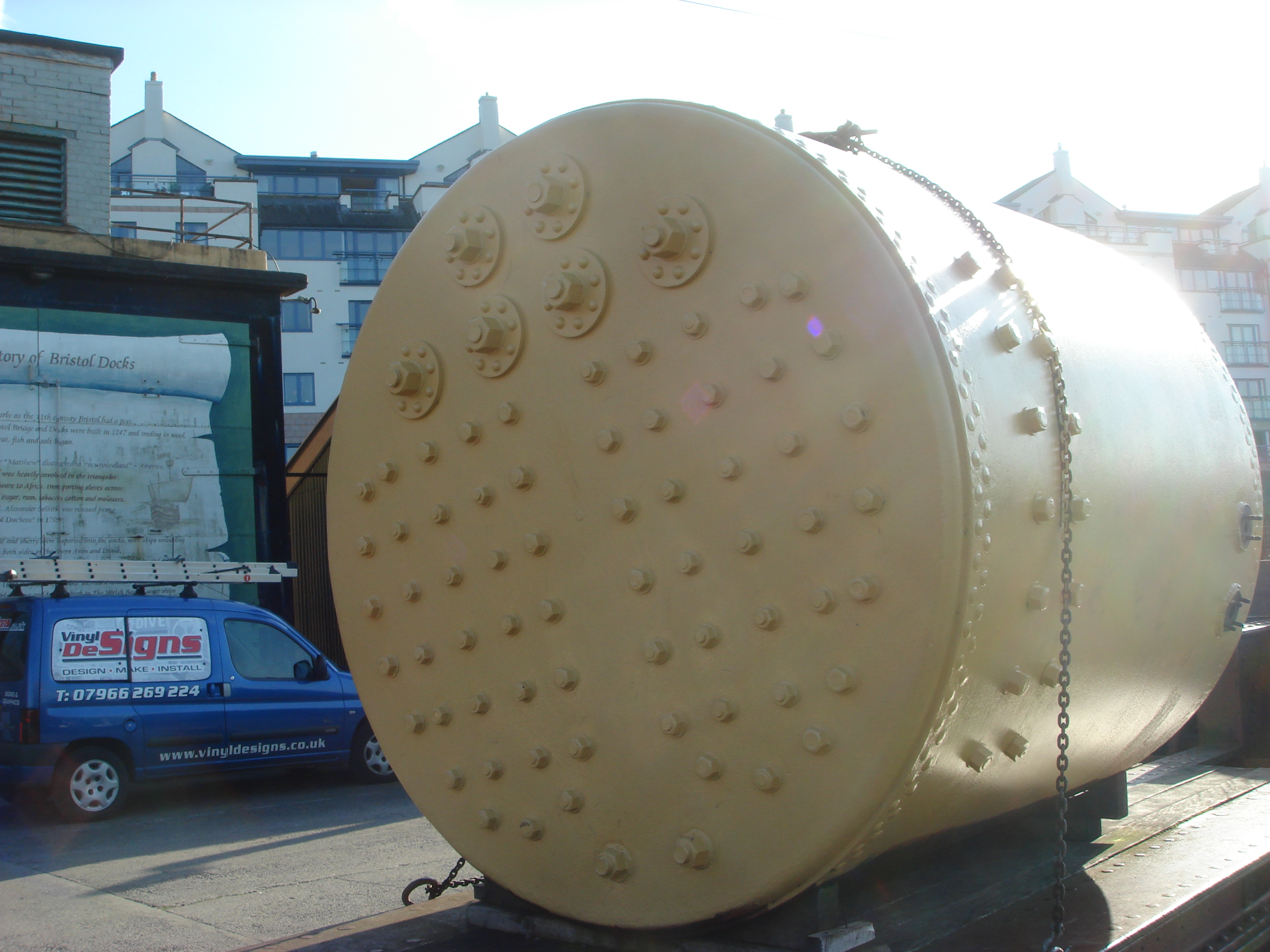
Rear face of the boiler of steam tug Mayflower, showing the stays supporting the combustion chambers

The far end of the furnace is an enclosed box called the combustion chamber which extends upwards to link up with the firetubes.

The front wall of the combustion chamber is supported against steam pressure by the tubes themselves. The rear face is stayed by rod stays through the rear shell of the boiler. Above the combustion chamber and tubes is an open steam collecting space. Larger long rod stays run the length of the boiler through this space, supporting the ends of the boiler shell.

With multiple furnaces, there is a separate combustion chamber for each furnace. A few small boilers did connect them into one chamber, but this design is weaker. A more serious problem is the risk of reversing the draught, where exhaust from one furnace could blow back and out of the adjacent one, injuring the stokers working in front of it.

== Origins ==
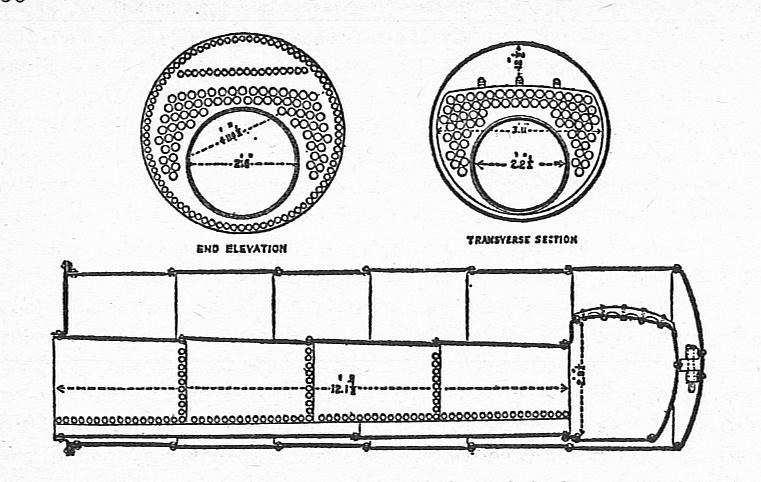
'Wilberforce' boiler in section

The first recorded boiler of comparable form was used in a railway locomotive, Hackworth's 'Wilberforce' class of 1830. This had a long cylindrical boiler shell similar to his earlier return-flued 'Royal George' , but with the return flue replaced by a number of small firetubes, as had been demonstrated so effectively by Stephenson with his 'Rocket' a year earlier. The novel feature of an entirely internal combustion chamber was used. Unlike the later Scotch boiler though, this was self-supported by its own stays, rather than using stays through the walls of the boiler shell. This allowed the entire assembly of outer tubeplate, furnace tube, combustion chamber and firetubes to all be removed from the boiler shell as one unit, simplifying manufacture and maintenance. Although a valuable feature, this became impractical for larger diameter chambers that would require the support of the shell.

== Variants ==
=== Number of furnaces ===
Typical practice for ships was to have two furnaces in each boiler. Smaller boilers might only have one, larger boilers commonly had three. The limitation in boiler size was the amount of work each stoker could do, firing one furnace per man. Larger ships (meaning anything above the smallest) would have many boilers.

As with the Lancashire boiler, the furnace was often corrugated for strength. Various makers had their own particular ways of making these corrugations, leading to their classification for maintenance purposes under the broad titles of, Leeds, Morrison, Fox, Purves or Brown.

=== Wet back and dry back ===
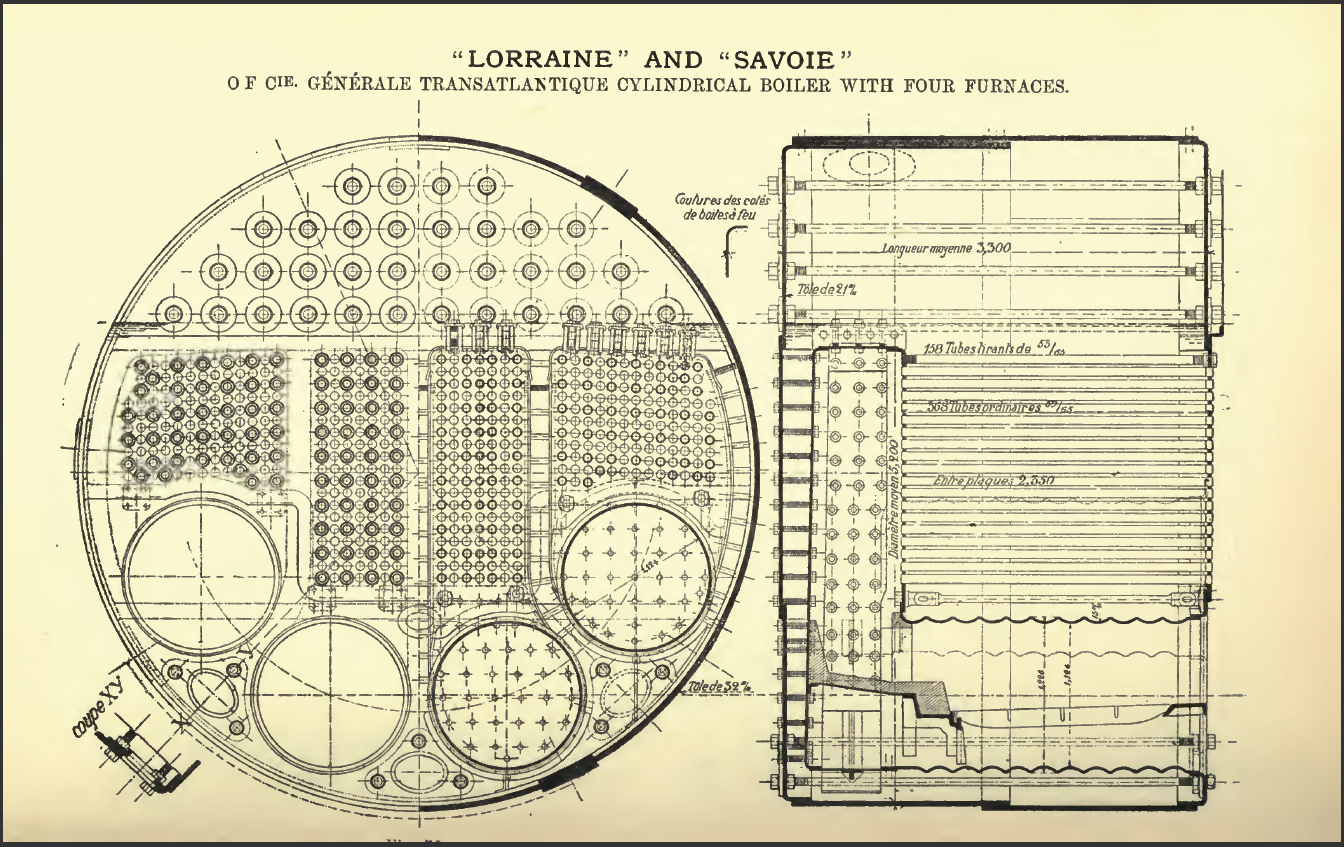
Cross and longitudinal section of a four-furnace boiler

The typical design is the "wet back", where the rear face of the combustion chamber is water-jacketed as a heating surface.

The "dry back" variation has the rear of the combustion chamber as an open box, backed or surrounded by only a brick lined sheet-metal jacket. This simplifies construction, but also loses much efficiency. It is used for only small boilers where capital cost outweighs fuel costs. Although the Scotch boiler is nowadays rarely the primary steam generator on a ship, small dry-back designs such as the Minipac are still encountered, for supporting secondary demands whilst alongside in port with the main boilers cold.

One interesting variant of the dry-back design has been a patent for burning ash-prone fuels. The rear of the combustion chamber is used as an access point for an ash separator, removing the ash before the small-diameter tubes.

=== Double-ended ===
The double-ended design places two boilers back-to-back, removing the rear wall of the boiler shell. The combustion chambers and firetubes remain separate. This design saves some structural weight, but it also makes the boiler longer and more difficult to install into a ship. For this reason they were not commonly used, although back-to-back arrangements of multiple single-ended boilers were common.

=== Inglis ===
The "Inglis" modification adds an extra combustion chamber where an additional single large flue returns from the rear to the front of the boiler. Flow through the multiple tubes is thus from front to back, and so the exhaust is at the rear. Multiple furnaces would share a single combustion chamber.

The major advantage of the Inglis is the extra heating area it adds, for a comparable shell volume, of perhaps 20%. Surprisingly this is not from the additional combustion chamber, but from lengthening the narrow firetubes. These can now run the full length of the boiler shell, rather than just the rather shorter distance from the inner combustion chamber to the front tubeplate. Despite this advantage, it is rarely used.

== Use in ships ==
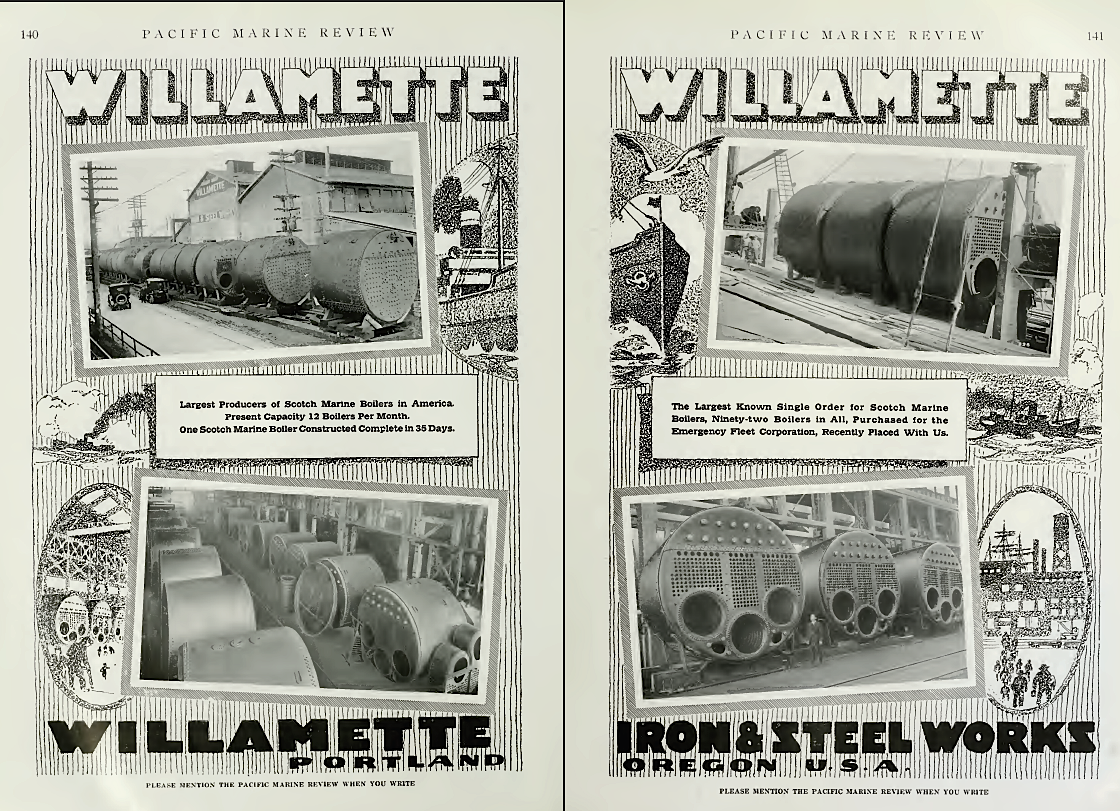
Willamette Iron and Steel Works advertisement noting large Emergency Fleet Corporation boiler orders

The Scotch marine boiler achieved near-universal use throughout the heyday of steam propulsion, particularly for the most highly developed piston engines such as the triple-expansion compounds. It lasted from the end of the low-pressure haystack boilers in the mid-19th century through to the early 20th century and the advent of steam turbines with high-pressure water-tube boilers such as the Yarrow.

Large or fast ships could require a great many boilers. The Titanic had 29 boilers: 24 double-ended and 5 smaller single-ended. The larger boilers were 15 feet 9 inches (4.80 m) in diameter and 20 feet (6.1 m) long, the smaller were 11 feet 9 inches (3.58 m) in length. All ends had three corrugated Morrison furnaces of 3 feet 9 inches (1.14 m) diameter, 159 furnaces in total, and a working pressure of 215 pounds per square inch (1,480 kPa; 14.6 atm).

Some motor ships, powered by internal combustion engines, also carried Scotch boilers. So-called exhaust-gas boilers were heated by the hot, exhaust gas of the main engines. An example is the diesel-powered, Monte-class passenger ships that were built in Germany in the 1920s and were each fitted with two boilers. The steam generated was used for auxiliary machinery.

=== Shipboard working examples ===
Numerous Scotch boilers are in use on ships as of 2010, and new boilers can be built to replace life-expired ones. Examples of preserved steam boats employing Scotch boilers include:

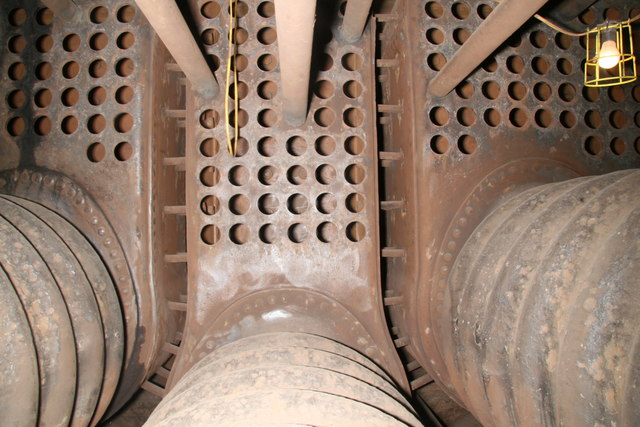
Inside the Daniel Adamson Scotch boiler

- Steam Tug / Tender Daniel Adamson built 1903 fully restored and cruising on River Weaver in Cheshire and on Manchester Ship Canal has one coal fired Scotch Boiler fired by three furnaces.
- Steam tug Mayflower, Bristol Industrial Museum
- Baltimore, of 1906, at the Baltimore Museum of Industry, is the oldest working steam tug in the US.
- Steamship Shieldhall based in Southampton, UK, is fully operational and has two oil-fired Scotch boilers.
- Steam-powered icebreaker Stettin, operating on two coal-fired boilers
- Steam-powered drifter Lydia Eva, based in Lowestoft or Great Yarmouth, Fully operational coal-fired Scotch boiler.
- The steam tug Kerne built 1913. Operated out of Liverpool by the Steam Tug Kerne Preservation Society. One coal-fired wet back Scotch marine boiler with two furnaces. Max working pressure 180 pounds per square inch (1,200 kPa).
- The steam ship Trafik built 1892 in Stockholm Sweden by Bergsunds Mekaniska Verkstad as a passenger and freight ship on the Swedisk lake Vättern and with homeport Hjo. The machinery and its boiler are the original ones made for the ship in Stockholm.
- The oil-burning steam tug Canning, built in 1954. First based in Liverpool, but worked at Swansea Docks from 1966 and now part of the National Waterfront Museum there.
