= Barnbow Munitions Factory =

Coordinates: 53.808°N 1.414°W

Barnbow Munitions Factory, officially known as National Filling Factory No. 1., was founded during the First World War.

It was situated in Barnbow, a small settlement situated near the city of Leeds in the township and parish of Barwick in Elmet.

In 1916 a massive explosion killed 35 of the women who worked there.

== Background ==
After the declaration of war with Germany in August 1914, there was suddenly an urgent need for large volumes of arms and munitions. Shells were already being filled and armed at Leeds Forge Company, based at Armley, which by August 1915 was filling 10,000 shells per week. However new factories were required to dramatically increase production. A committee, chaired by Joseph Watson the Leeds soap manufacturer, was established for the purpose and decided to build a munitions factory from scratch. A governing board was organized to oversee construction on the new site, which was earmarked for Barnbow, situated between Cross Gates and Garforth. Barnbow became the most productive British shell factory of the First World War.

Railway tracks were laid directly into the factory complex to transport materials in and transport goods out. Platforms of over 800 feet (240 m) were added to the nearby railway station to transport workers to and from work at the site. Massive factory buildings were quickly built, power lines were erected to bring power, and shell filling operations began in December 1915.

A water main was laid that delivered 200,000 gallons of water per day, and changing rooms and a canteen were also rapidly built. The whole site covered 200 acres (0.81 km^{2}), but due to security concerns there was a huge press blackout about the area.

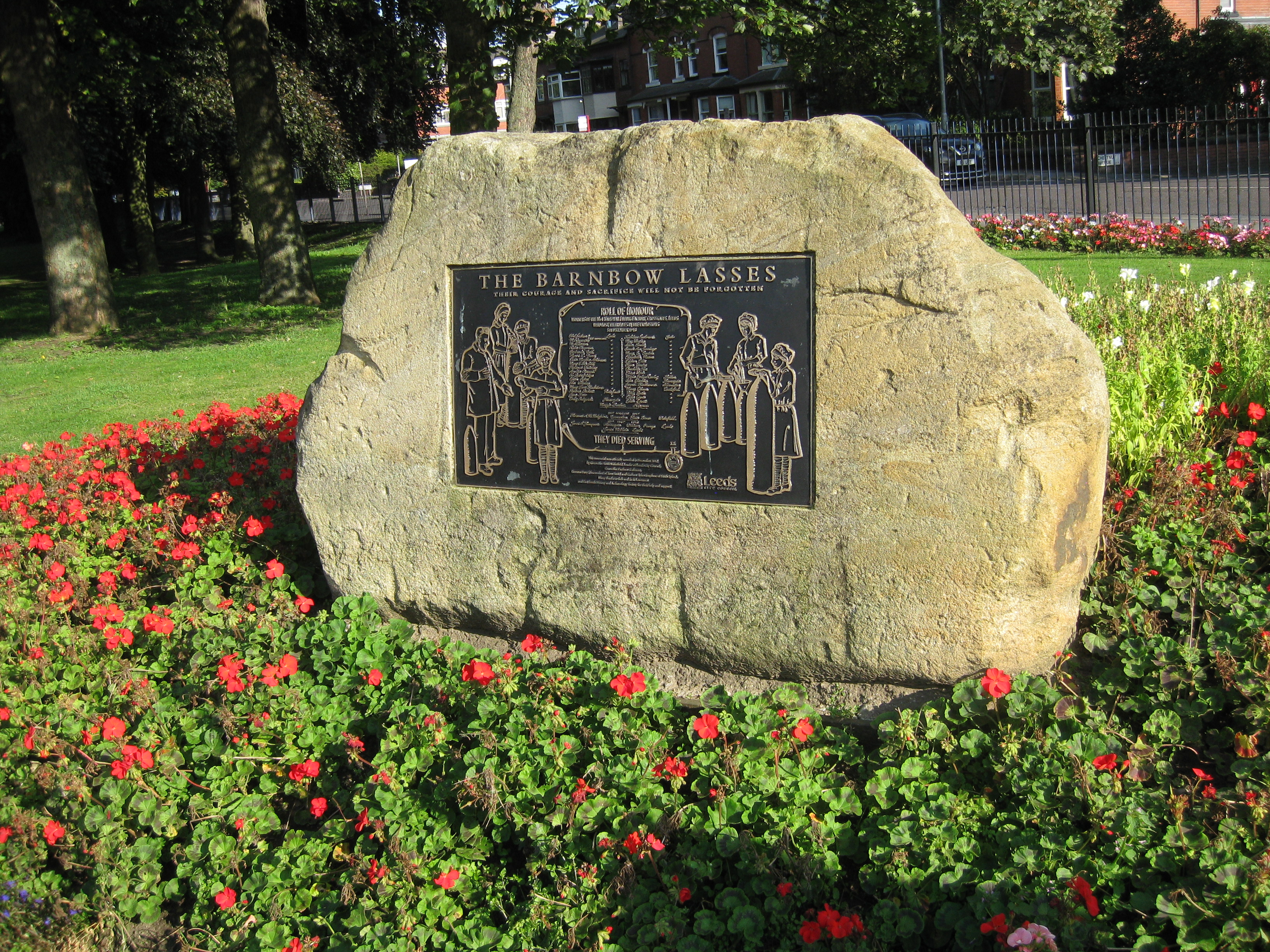
Memorial to the Barnbow Lasses, Manston Park, Cross Gates, Leeds

== The work force ==
An extremely large work force was required so an employment agency was set up at the Wellesley Building in Leeds. A third of the staff was recruited from Leeds itself, and other workers came from York, Castleford, Wakefield, Harrogate, Pontefract and many of the small villages nearby. For six days a week, a 24-hour three-shift system was set up, and by October 1916 there were 16,000 people working at Barnbow (over 130,000 people had applied). As the war progressed, the number of men on the site dwindled (due to the death rate on the war front), and the workforce ended up with around 93 per cent women and girls (affectionately known as "The Barnbow Lasses"). Workers earnings averaged £3 per week, though through a bonus scheme women handling the explosives could take home between £10-£12 per week. Thirty-eight trains per day were run, transporting the workers to and from work.

One of the managers at the factory was Leeds City manager Herbert Chapman, who went on to manage Huddersfield Town and Arsenal.

== Conditions ==
Working conditions were barely tolerable at Barnbow. The workers who handled the explosives had to strip to their underwear, and wear smocks and caps. Rubber soled shoes were also provided, and cigarettes and matches were completely banned. The hours on site were long, and the staff did not receive holidays at all. The food rationing was also rather severe, but the workers were allowed to drink as much barley water and milk as they liked, due to the nature of their jobs. Barnbow had its own farm, housing 120 cows which produced 300 gallons of milk per day. The workers often worked with Cordite which was a propellant for the shells, but had the unfortunate side effect on people who came into contact with it of turning their skin yellow. A cure for this ailment was to drink plenty of milk. Due to the "yellow" appearance of many of the women's skin, it earned them the nickname The Barnbow Canaries. This inspired a play called Barnbow Canaries, written by Alice Nutter of Chumbawamba, which premiered at the West Yorkshire Playhouse in the summer of 2016.

== The explosion ==
Just after 10 pm on Tuesday 5 December 1916, several hundred women and girls had just started their shift at the factory. Four and a half inch shells were being filled, fuzed, finished off and packed. Room 42 was mainly used for the filling, and around 170 girls worked there. Shells were brought to the room fully loaded, and all that was left to do was for the fuze to be added and the shell cap screwed down. The fuze was inserted by hand, then a machine screwed the fuze down tightly.

At 10:27pm a violent explosion suddenly rocked room 42 killing 35 women outright, and maiming and injuring many more. Many of the dead were only identifiable by the identity discs they wore around their necks. The machine where the explosion occurred was completely destroyed.

Despite the danger still remaining in room 42, many other workers hurried in to help the injured and get them to safety.

Production was stopped only for a short while, and once the bodies were removed other girls were volunteering to work in room 42. Many of the injured girls and women went for convalescence.

Because of the censorship at the time, no account of the accident was made public, though Field Marshal Sir Douglas Haig paid tribute to the devotion and sacrifice of the workers killed. Many death notices appeared in the Yorkshire Evening Post, stating cause of death as killed by accident: the only clue to the tragedy that had befallen them.

Six years after the end of the war, the public were finally told the facts of the explosion at Barnbow.

There were a further two explosions at the factory: the first, in March 1917, killed Elsie Bruce and Florence Hodgkins; the second, in May 1918, killed three men, William Orange, James McHale and James S. Thompson.

Barnbow was Britain's top shell factory between 1914 and 1918, and by the end of the war on 11 November 1918, a total of 566,000 tons of ammunition had been shipped overseas.

== After the First World War ==
In the Second World War, the factory became ROF Leeds, and postwar manufactured the Centurion tank.

In 1925 the Five Sisters window at York Minster was rededicated to the 1,513 women who died in the line of service during the First World War, including the women who died at Barnbow.

In October 2016, the site of Barnbow Munitions Factory was listed as a scheduled monument.

There are two memorials to those killed, each listing all the names. In Manston Park is a stone with a plaque. On Cross Gates Road, by the roundabout at the Ring Road are 3 small stones with a simple inscription. Around them on the ground are metal tiles, each bearing the name of one of the women.

In February 2025, a blue plaque was unveiled in Pontefract Town Hall commemorating Barnbow munitions worker Mary Lucy Turner who died of TNT poisoning. Her plaque is also intended to commemorate the many other Barnbow Canaries who died of the same cause.

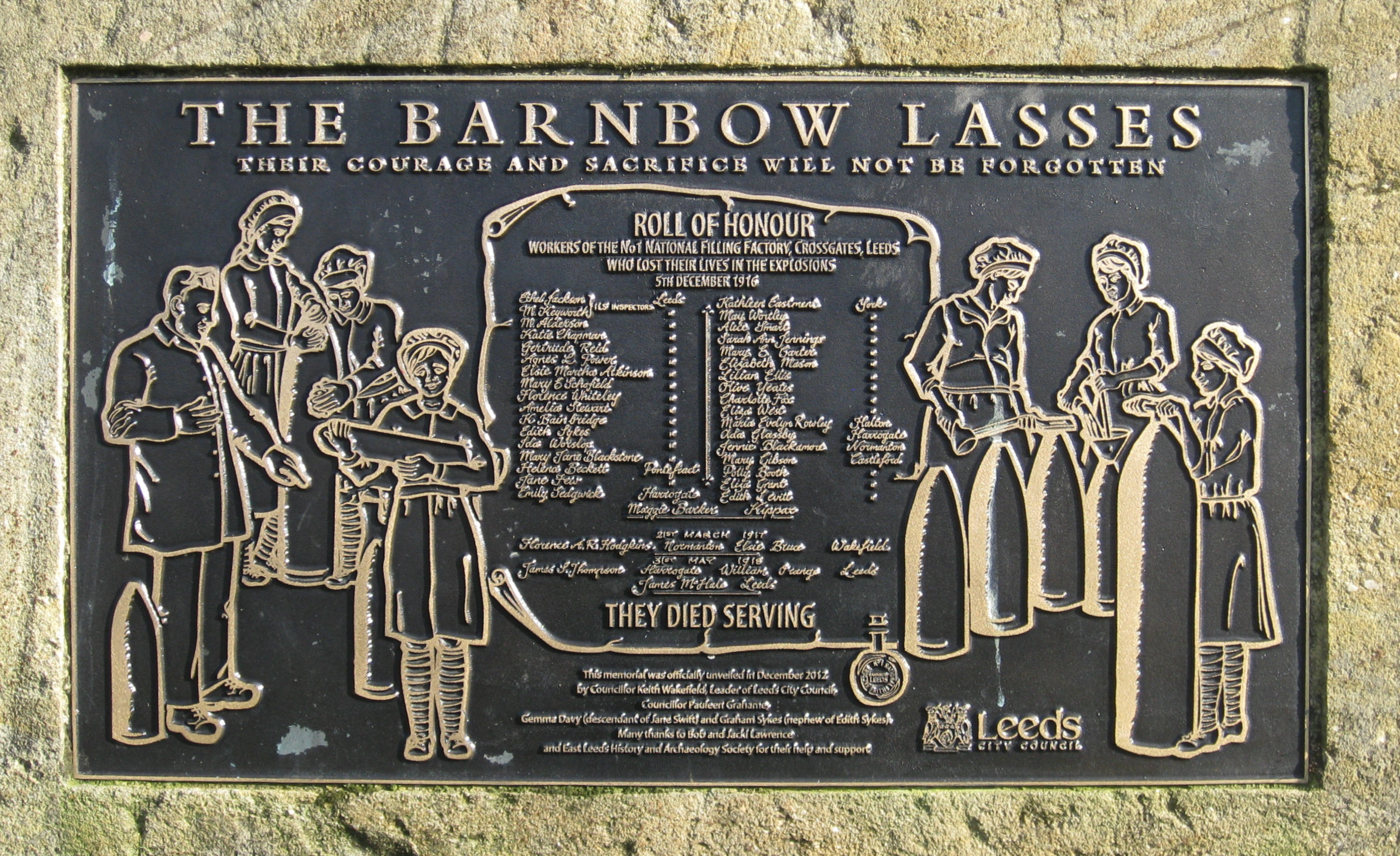
Plaque in Manston Park

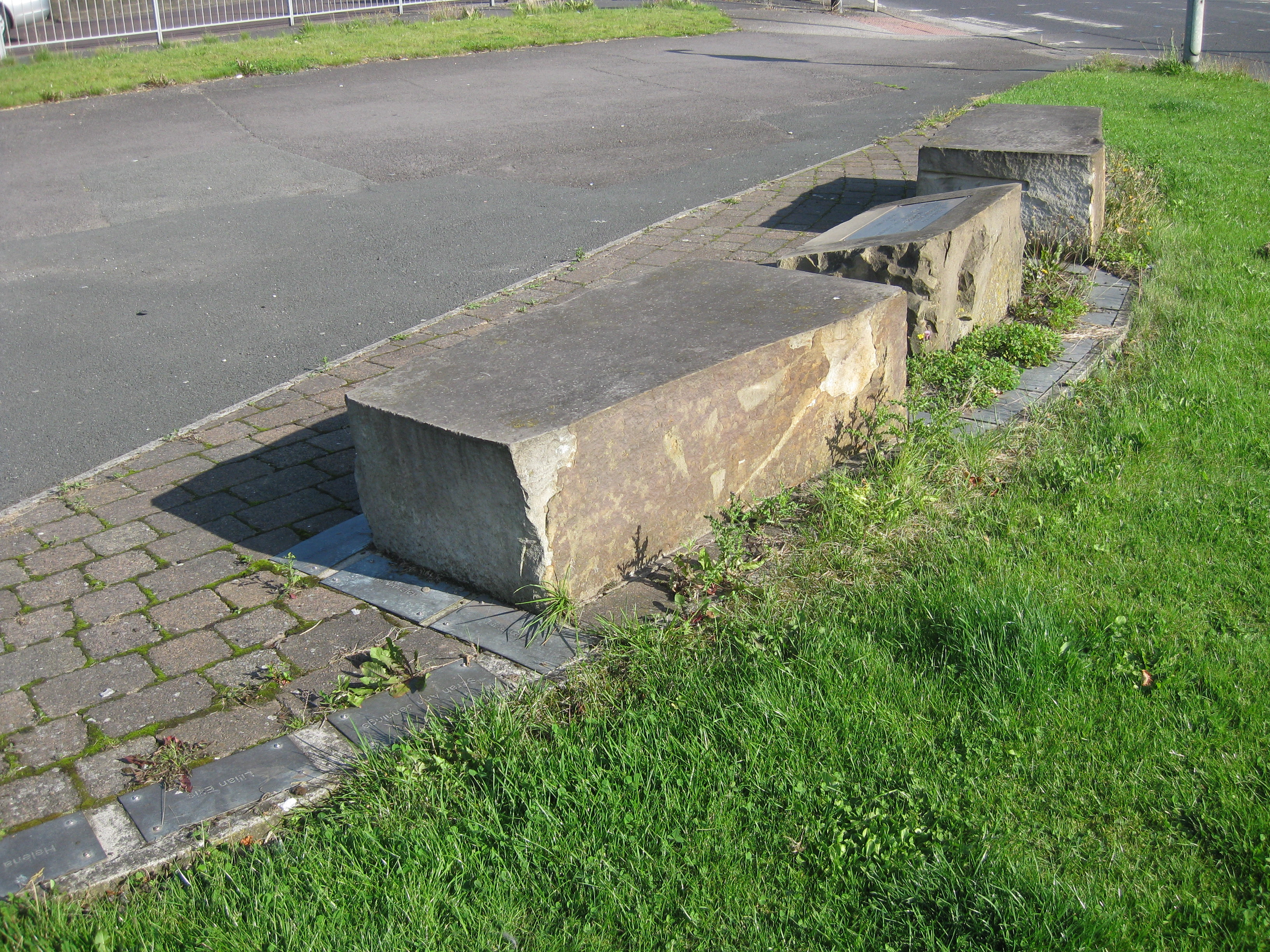
Memorial stones on Cross Gates Road

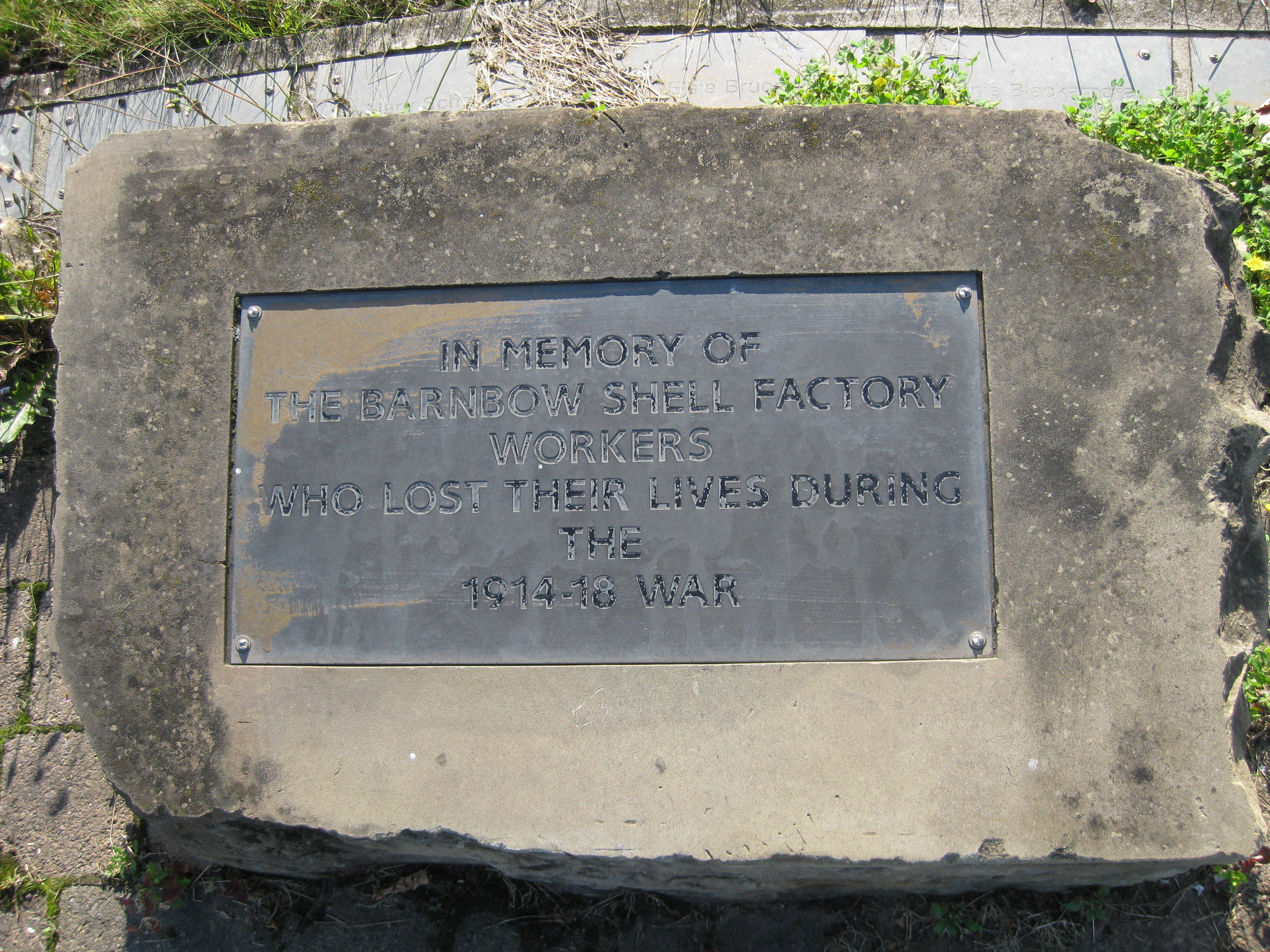
Plaque on Cross Gates Road

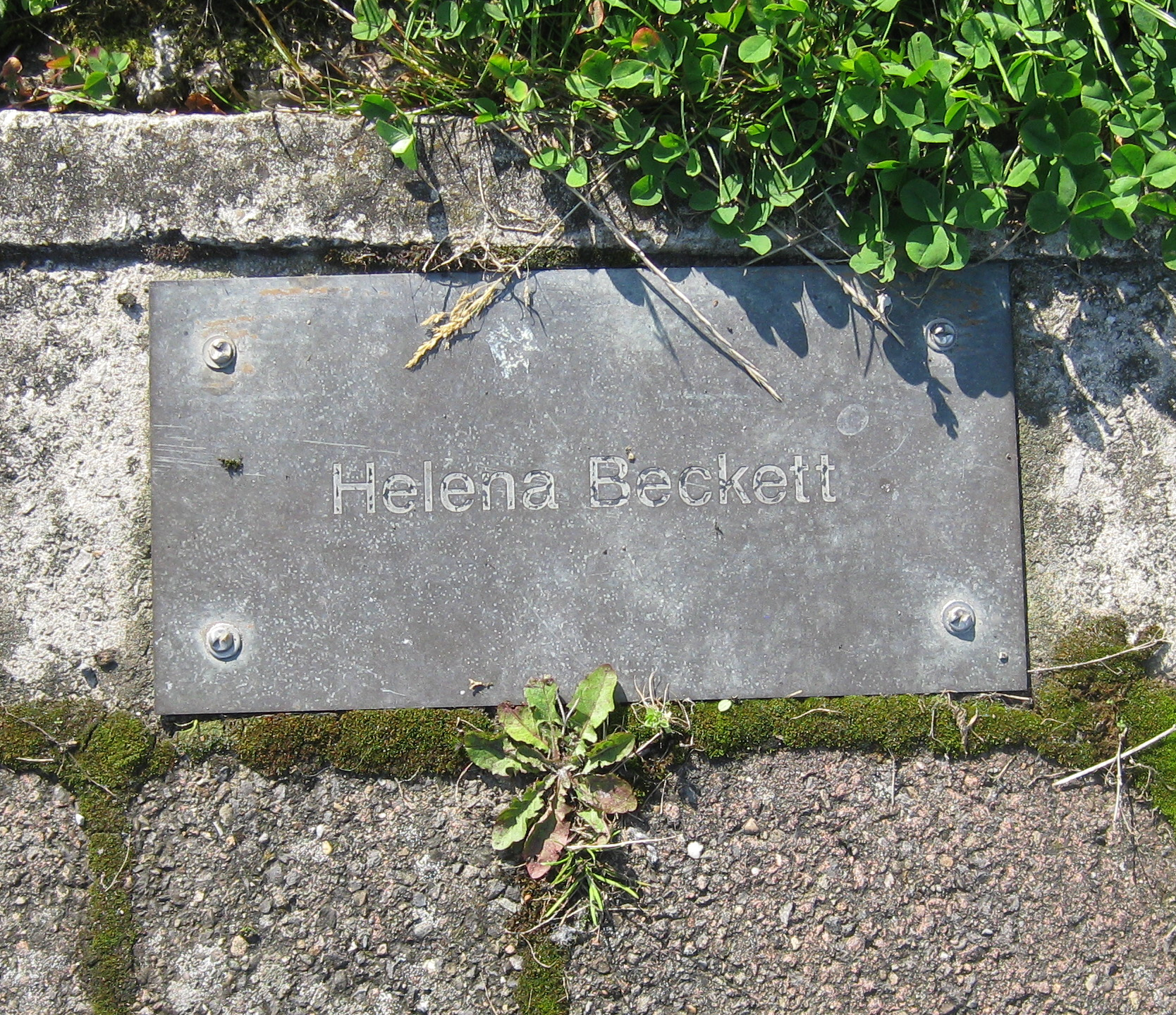
Helena Beckett was from Pontefract. She is buried in Pontefract Cemetery.

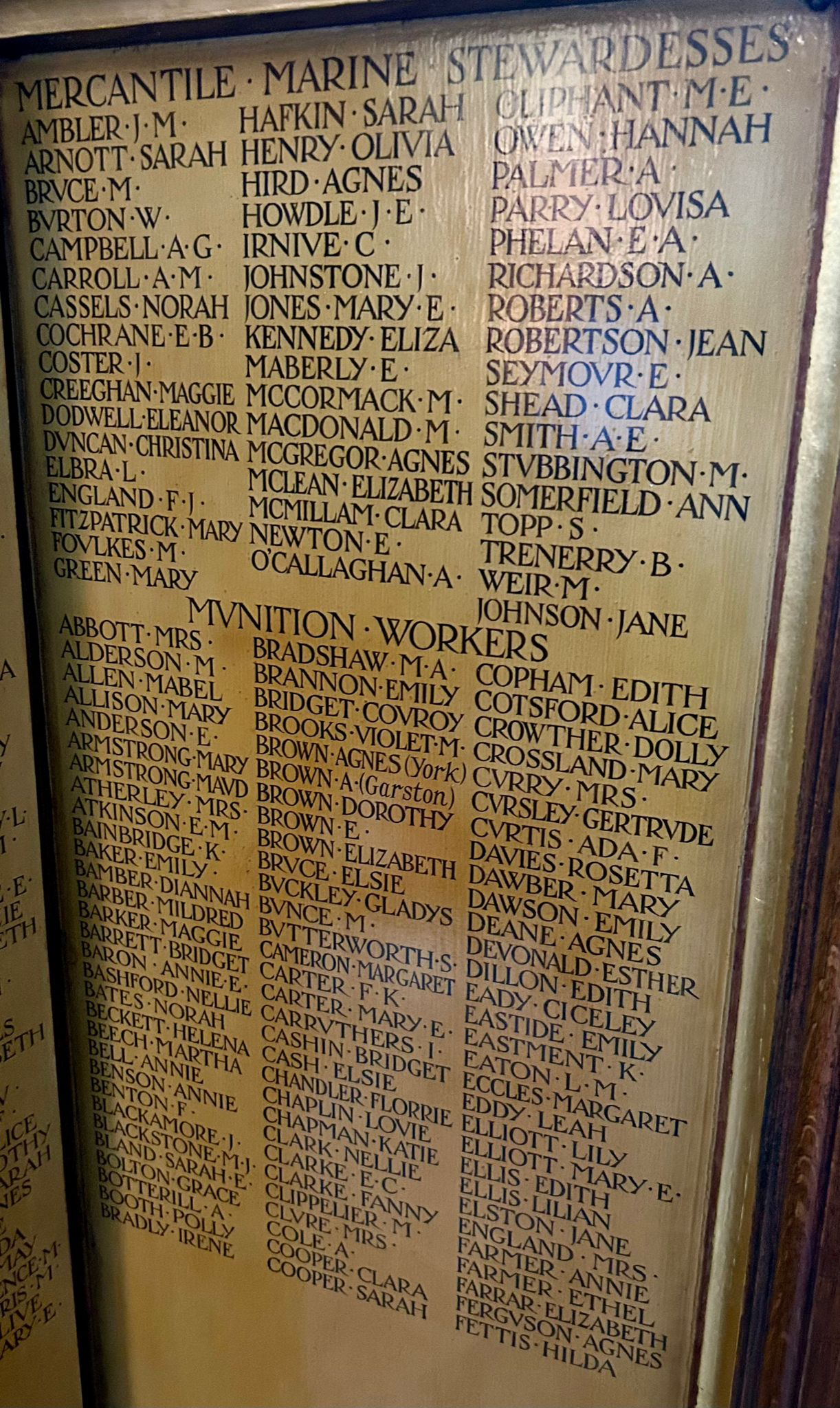
Oak panel from York Minster's Five Sisters window listing female munitions workers' that died in the First World War

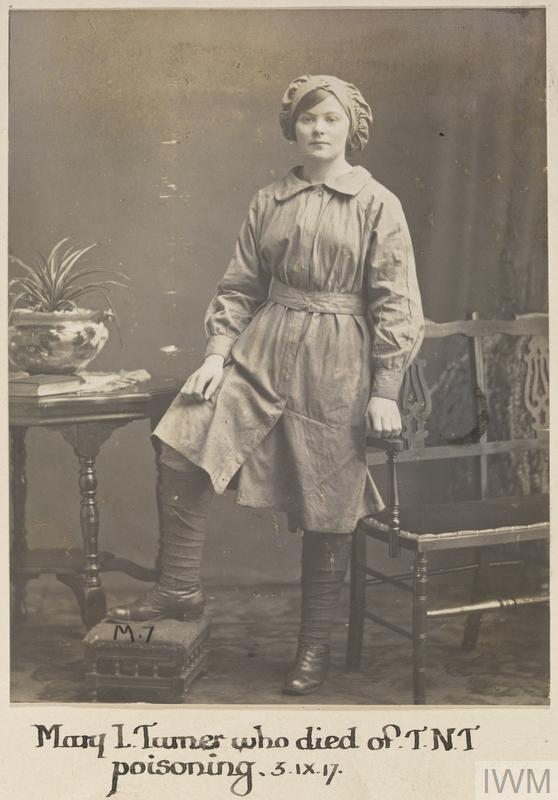
Mary Lucy Turner who died of TNT poisoning 3 September 1917

== See also ==
- Filling factories in the United Kingdom
