= Barnbow =

Settlement in West Yorkshire, England

Coordinates: 53°48′23.9″N 1°24′53.7″W

Barnbow was a small settlement situated near the city of Leeds in the township and parish of Barwick in Elmet. The site is noted as the location of a munitions factory founded during the First World War. It was officially known as National Filling Factory No. 1. In 1916 a massive explosion killed 35 of the women who worked there.

== History ==
The name Barnbow is first attested in the period 1185–93 in the unique form Barnesburc and in the form Barnebu, which is more representative of later attestations. The name comes from the Old Norse personal name Bjarni and the word bú ('homestead, estate'). Thus, when coined, the name meant 'Bjarni's homestead'. However, the name was by the thirteenth century sometimes reinterpreted as including the word bow (from Old Norse bogi and/or Old English boga), which influenced its present form.

The settlement lies near to where the Cock Beck rises, and was previously the seat of a hall owned by the Gascoigne family. In the late 17th century, Sir Thomas Gascoigne was accused of being involved in a plot to overthrow the king and restore a Catholic monarch to the throne. The plot was similar to the Popish Plot laid out by Titus Oates, but the accusation was brought against Sir Thomas by an old estate worker at Barnbow who had been sacked for stealing. Sir Thomas was found not guilty.

== Barnbow munitions factory ==
See Barnbow Munitions Factory.

After the declaration of war with Germany in August 1914, there was suddenly an urgent need for large volumes of arms and munitions. Shells were already being filled and armed at Leeds Forge Company, based at Armley, which by August 1915 was filling 10,000 shells per week. However new factories were required to dramatically increase production. A committee, chaired by Joseph Watson the Leeds soap manufacturer, was established for the purpose and decided to build a munitions factory from scratch. A governing board was organized to oversee construction on the new site, which was earmarked for Barnbow, situated between Cross Gates and Garforth. Barnbow became the most productive British shell factory of the First World War.

Railway tracks were laid directly into the factory complex to transport materials in and transport goods out. Platforms of over 800 feet (240 m) were added to the nearby railway station to transport workers to and from work at the site. Massive factory buildings were quickly built, power lines were erected to bring power, and shell filling operations began in December 1915.

A water main was laid and deliver 200,000 gallons of water per day, and changing rooms and a canteen were also rapidly built. The whole site covered 200 acres (0.81 km^{2}), but due to security concerns there was a huge press blackout about the area.

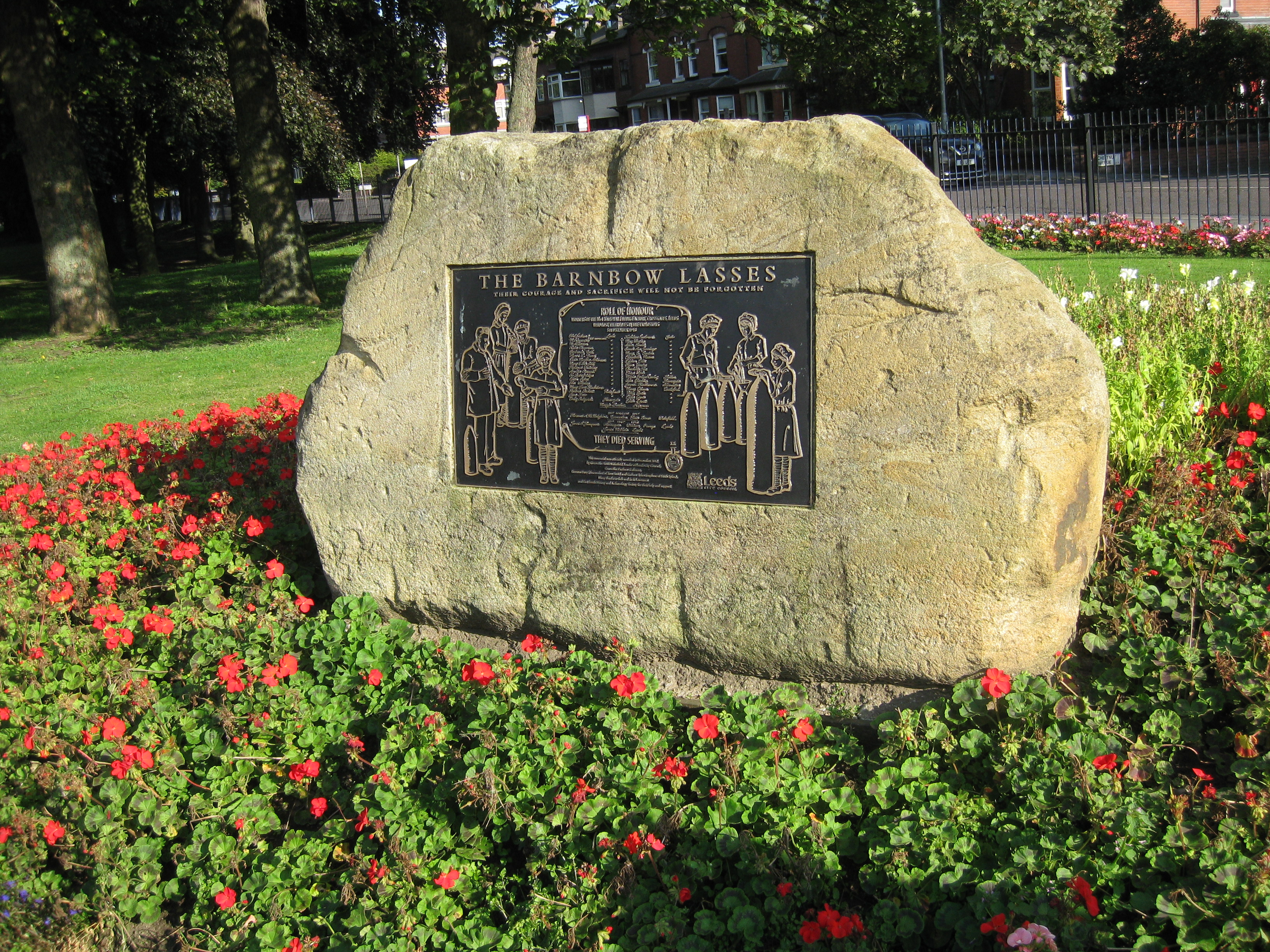
Memorial to the Barnbow Lasses, Manston Park, Cross Gates, Leeds

== Notable people ==
- Catherine Gascoigne, abbess of Cambrai, was born in Barnbow

== See also ==
- Filling factories in the United Kingdom
