= Colin Thornley =

British Honduran governor

Sir Colin Hardwick Thornley KCMG CVO (1907 – 1 March 1983) was a British colonial administrator. He was Governor of British Honduras from 1955/6 to 1961.

== Life ==
He was the son of John Hardwick Thornley, a physician in Scarborough and son of the Rev. John James Thornley of Workington, and his wife Kathleen Irene Taylor, daughter of Thomas Albert Oak(e)s Taylor of the Clarence Iron Works, Leeds, and sister of Tom Taylor. He was educated at Bramcote School and Uppingham School, and graduated from Brasenose College, Oxford.

Thornley joined the Colonial Administrative Service, and was in the Tanganyika Territory, from 1930 to 1939. Then in the Colonial Office in London he became Principal Private Secretary to the Secretary of State for the Colonies. Internally he expressed the opinion that reverses in World War II's initial stages had some relation with the lack of connection between the British Empire and its subjects, a criticism raised by US allies.

From 1945 to 1952 Thornley was involved in the administration of Kenya Colony. He assisted Governor Sir Philip Mitchell in defusing the contentious proposal for universal fingerprinting there, after the commission led by Bertrand Glancy had caused deadlock and Albert George Keyser insisted on further debate. He moved to be Chief Secretary to the Protectorate of Uganda, 1952 to 1955. He was then Governor of British Honduras to 1961, retiring in 1962.

Thornley was appointed Director-General of the Save the Children Fund in 1965, a post he held to 1974.

== Family ==
Thornley married in 1940 Muriel Betty Hobson, daughter of Henry Overton Hobson M.B. They had a son and two daughters.
