= Howard Parkes =

English athlete

Personal information
- Full name: Howard Roderick Parkes
- Born: 31 May 1877; Birmingham, England
- Died: 28 May 1920 (aged 42); Studland, Dorset, England
- Batting: Right-handed
- Role: Batsman

Domestic team information
- Years: Team
- 1900: London County
- 1898: Warwickshire
- First-class debut: 22 August 1898 Warwickshire v Leicestershire
- Last First-class: 19 July 1900 London County v Warwickshire

Career statistics
Competition	First-class
Matches	7
Runs scored	79
Batting average	7.90
100s/50s	0/0
Top score	21
Balls bowled	0
Wickets	-
Bowling average	-
5 wickets in innings	-
10 wickets in match	-
Best bowling	-
Catches/stumpings	3/0
- Source: CricketArchive, 3 December 2007

Howard Roderick Parkes (31 May 1877 – 28 May 1920) was an English cricketer and athlete. A right-handed batsman, he played first-class cricket for London County and Warwickshire.

== Career ==
Howard Parkes' first recorded senior match was for the Gentlemen of Surrey against the Gentlemen of Netherlands. It was an unsuccessful debut, as he was bowled for a duck in each innings. Two years later, he played for the Surrey Second XI against the Lancashire Second XI, and in 1898 made his first-class debut for Warwickshire against Leicestershire.

Between 1897 and 1900 he attended Oxford University. Whilst he did play in trial matches, he never played for the university cricket team, though he did represent them at hurdling. He won the National Championship over 120 yards hurdles at the 1898 AAA Championships.

In 1900, he played a second match for the Surrey Second XI, against Glamorgan, in addition to six first-class matches for London County, also representing them against the West Indies.

In November 1904, he played for Shanghai against the Straits Settlements in Hong Kong, opening the batting.

He died in Dorset in 1920 from the effects of gas poisoning suffered whilst on active service in France with the Royal Garrison Artillery in World War I, and was buried at Molesey Cemetery, West Molesey, Surrey. His brother-in-law Tom Taylor played for Yorkshire between 1899 and 1906, playing 130 first-class matches in total.
