= List of munition workers who died of TNT poisoning =

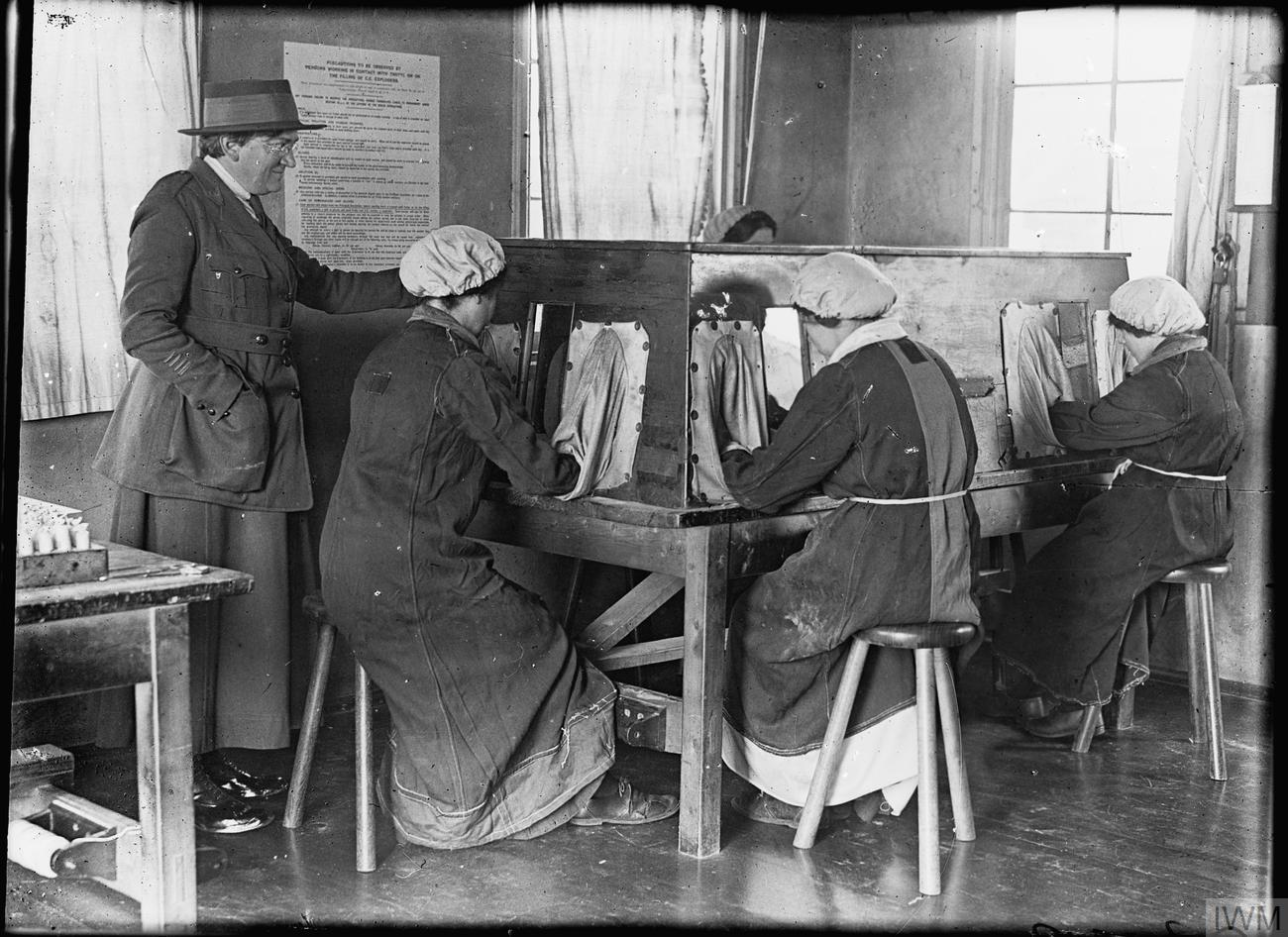
Lilian Barker OBE supervising munition workers working with TNT

These are munition workers who died of TNT poisoning during the manufacture of ammunition for the front lines of World War I. Working with TNT caused many health issues, commonly called TNT poisoning, the most serious of which was a liver disease called toxic jaundice. According to historian Anne Spurgeon, during the First World War, there were 400 cases of the disease of which about 100 were fatal. Munition workers were sometimes called Canary Girls, British women who worked in munitions manufacturing trinitrotoluene (TNT) shells during the First World War1 (1914–1918). The nickname arose because exposure to TNT is toxic, and repeated exposure can turn the skin an orange-yellow colour reminiscent of the plumage of a canary.

== Effects of working with TNT ==
Shells were filled with a mixture of TNT (the explosive) and cordite (the propellant), and even though these ingredients were known to be hazardous to health, they were mixed by hand so came into direct contact with the workers' skin. The chemicals in the TNT reacted with melanin in the skin to cause a yellow pigmentation, staining the skin of the munitions workers. Although unpleasant, this specific side effect was not dangerous and the discolouration eventually faded over time with no long-term health effects.

A more serious consequence of working with TNT powder was liver toxicity, which led to anaemia and jaundice. This condition, known as "toxic jaundice", gave the skin a different type of yellow hue.

A medical investigation was carried out by the government in 1916, to closely study the effects of TNT on the munitions workers. The investigators were able to gather their data by acting as female medical officers posted inside the factories. They found that the effects of the TNT could be roughly split into two areas: irritative symptoms, mainly affecting the skin, respiratory tract, and digestive system; and toxic symptoms, including nausea, jaundice, constipation, dizziness, etc. It is possible that the irritative symptoms were also partly caused by the cordite in the shell mixture, although this was not established until years later.

== Partial list of those killed by TNT poisoning ==
| Name | Date of death | Photo | Notes | References |
|---|---|---|---|---|
| Annie Holmes | 28 June 1916 | | | |
| Gladys Pritchard | 1914-1918 | | | |
| Florrie Chandler | 1914-1918 | | | |
| Mrs Florence Portman | 1914-1918 | | | |
| Dorothy Willis | 7 July 1916 | | | |
| Elsie Oates | 1914-1918 | | | |
| Kate Hill | 1914-1918 | | | |
| Mary Anne Kelly | 1914-1918 | | | |
| Lottie Meade | 1914-1918 | | | |
| Helen Garvine | 4 August 1917 | | | |
| Margaret Silcock | 1914-1918 | | | |
| Alice Williams | 18 May 1916 | | | |
| Mary Lucy Turner | September 3, 1917 | | | |
| Maria Haverly | 28 May 1917 | | | |
| Louisa Preston | 1914-1918 | | | |
| Agnes Deane | 1914-1918 | | | |
| Annie Bell | 2 May 1917 | | | |
| Lizzie Jones | 23 October 1916 | | | |
| Mrs Elizabeth Walsh | 31 July 1917 | | | |
| Miss Marion Constance Lotinga | 1914-1918 | | | |
| Mrs Abbot | 7 May 1917 | | | |
| Lily Maud Leaver | 28 December 1917 | | | |
| Margaret Roscoe | 4 October 1917 | | | |
| Annie Evelyn Baron | 1914-1918 | | | |
| Annie Flynn | 6 May 1917 | | | |
| Edith Perkins | 20 January 1917 | | | |
| Alice Post | 16 January 1916 | | | |
| Margaret Cameron | 1917 | | | |

== Bibliography ==
Notes

References

- Livingstone-Learmonth, Agnes; Cunningham, Barbara Martin (12 August 1916). "The Effects of Tri-Nitro-Toluene on Women Workers" (PDF). The Lancet. PUB. pp. 261–310.
- Potts, Lauren; Rimmer, Monica (20 May 2017). "he Canary Girls: The workers the war turned yellow". BBC.
- Rosser, Sue Vilhauer (2008). Women, Science, and Myth: Gender Beliefs from Antiquity to the Present. ABC-Clio. ISBN 9781598840957. - Total pages: 502
- Weiner, J. S.; Thomson, M. L. (October 1947). "Observations on the Toxic Effects of Cordite". British Journal of Industrial Medicine. 4 (205). BMJ Group : 205–215. doi:10.1136/oem.4.4.205. ISSN 0007-1072. LCCN 99103194. OCLC 41236398. PMC 1035964. PMID 18919033.
