= Leeds Forge Company =

British railway rolling stock manufacturer

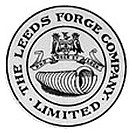
- Founded: 1874, Leeds, England
- Founder: Samson Fox
- Defunct: 1899 (United States), 1929 (United Kingdom)
- Fate: Fox Solid Pressed Steel company sold to C. T. Schoen in 1899, Armley Works sold to Cammell Laird in 1923.
- Products: Boiler furnaces and railway stock
- Number of employees: 400 (1893)

The Leeds Forge Company manufactured corrugated furnaces for marine steam engine boilers and pressed steel railway rolling stock.

== Early history ==
The company was founded by Samson Fox, who was born in 1838 in Bradford, Yorkshire. Samson apprenticed with Smith, Beacock and Tannett of Victoria Foundry, Leeds, succeeded Fenton, Murray and Jackson, builders of rail locomotives. While at Smith, Beacock and Tannett, Fox became their travelling representative. During this time he was acquainted with Scotts Shipbuilding and Engineering Company of Greenock, who were major shipbuilders on the Firth of Clyde. Scotts provided a large amount of the capital needed to establish the Leeds Forge at Castleton Field, Armley, Leeds in 1874, initially producing straight and cranked locomotive axles. The Leeds Forge Company started out making locomotive crank pins and axles, using hammer forging.

== The Corrugated Furnace ==
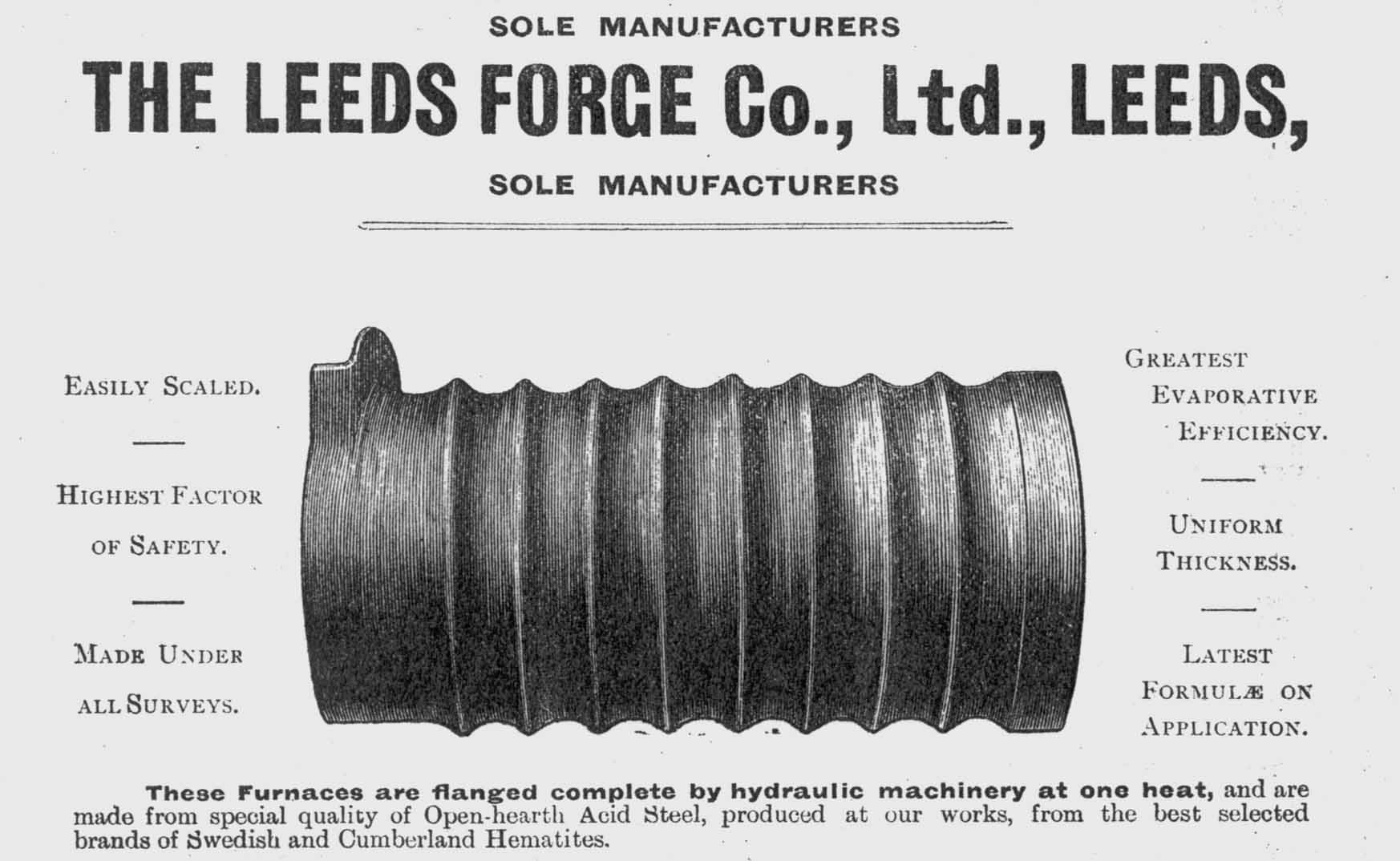

Fox registered a patent for his Corrugated Furnace in 1877. The Corrugated Furnace consisted of an iron (later steel) tube that was heated and swaged (later rolled) under pressure to form corrugations, increasing the surface area of the tube and thus allowing a greater energy transfer from the heat source to the boiler while also providing additional resistance to boiler pressure. James Humphreys of Barrow-in-Furness placed the initial order for six furnaces of 3 ft 1 in (0.9 m) diameter and 7 ft 6 in (2.3 m) long. The next year Fox succeeded in obtaining an order for two American ships and had secured U.S. patents by 1880. The German company Schulz, Knaudt of Essen began Licensed production of the Corrugated Furnace that same year. Leeds Forge rejected license applications from other companies including Taylor Bros, Clarence Ironworks, Leeds and John Brown & Company, Atlas Works, Sheffield. In 18982 Fox introduced the rolling process which led to the commercial success of the furnace, which were routinely fitted to ships both in the United Kingdom and United States.

== Pressed Steel Railway Vehicles ==
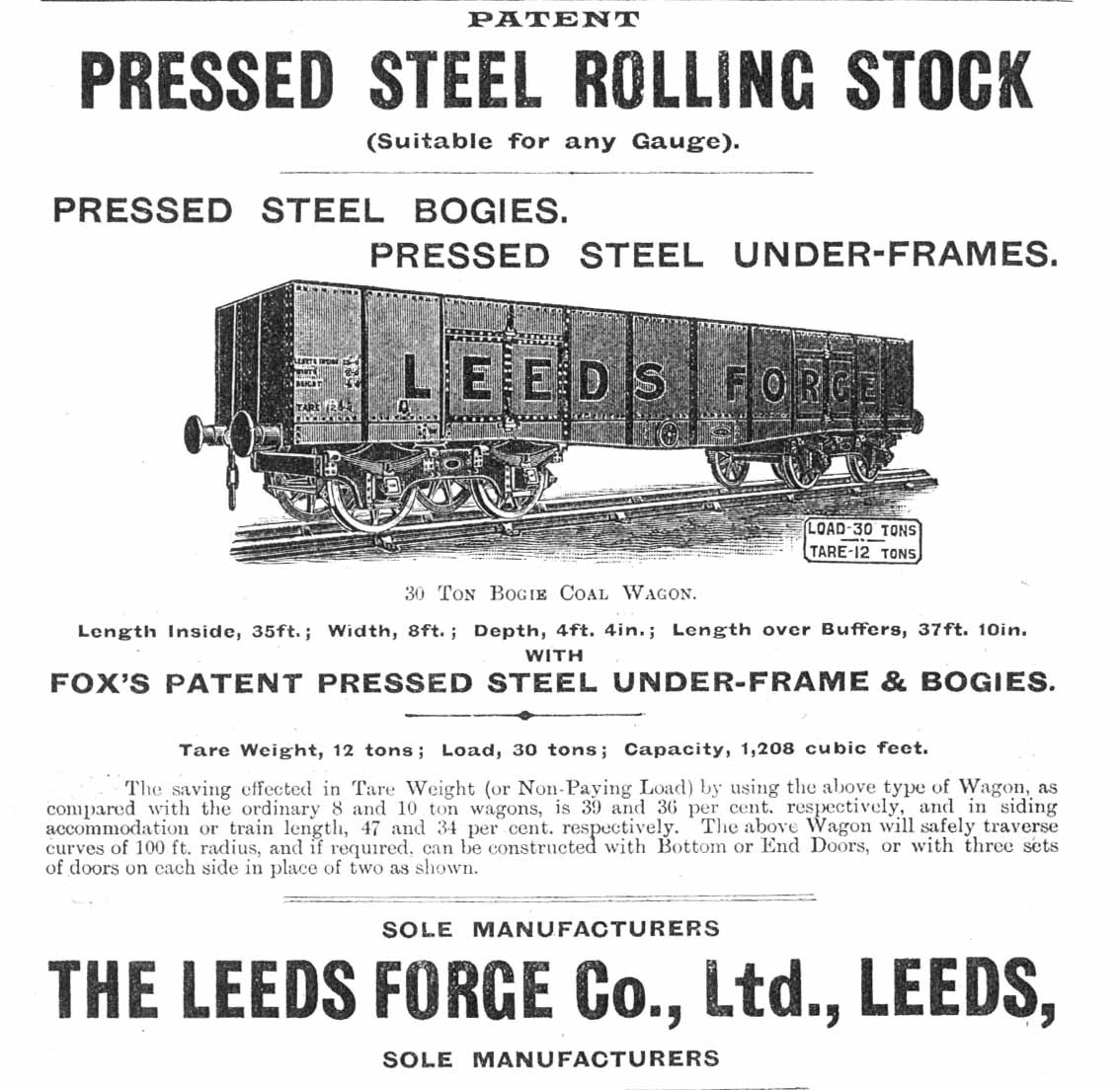

After the success of the corrugated furnace, Fox turned his attention to other products, and in 1887 exhibited in Newcastle his flanged frame plate for railway rolling stock. Traditional rolling stock was built of timber frames with a timber superstructure, producing a heavy vehicle that required considerable tractive effort from the locomotive. Pressed steel rolling stock was made from relatively lightweight flanged steel, giving it comparable strength to timber but considerable savings in dead weight. The construction technique, which used male and female dies in a hydraulic press, was very labor savings in comparison to hand-built timber cars. Fox found an ally in the promotion of his pressed steel vehicles in E R Calthrop, who promoted pressed steel rolling stock for his system of narrow gauge railways, and used them on the Barsi Light Railway.

The United States showed much more interested in pressed steel cars so in 1889 the Fox Solid Pressed Steel company was established in Joliet, Illinois, 40 miles (64 km) south-west of Chicago. Clem Hackney, who had previously worked for the Union Pacific Railroad, was made general manager. By 1893 the works employed 400 men producing 80 tramcars and freight cars per day. A larger plant was built in Pittsburgh in 1896. In 1899 Fox sold his American operation to rival Charles T. Schoen, who went on to form the Pressed Steel Car Company. The company stayed in business until it was purchased in 1923 by Cammell Laird, which closed the Armley works in 1929.

Leeds Forge successfully sued R.H.Clayton & Sons Ltd over patent infringement for an improved boiler flue. In 1924 the Leeds Forge Company built 50 electric carriages for the New South Wales Government Railways, Australia. The bodies were shipped to Sydney in knocked-down form and assembled at Eveleigh Railway Workshops and Clyde Engineering. They were the first all-steel carriages in Australia. In 1922 they supplied new all steel sleeping cars for the blue trains operating from Calais to French Riviera.

== Railway Locomotives ==
In 1928 Leeds Forge manufactured three Bo-Bo electric hopper cars on behalf of English Electric. They were supplied to British Portland Cement, Greenhithe, Kent.

== See also ==
- List of rolling stock manufacturers
- Internally rifled boiler tubes
