= List of bus stations in Wales =

This is a list of bus stations in Wales:

| Bus station or interchange | Location | Number of stands | City destinations | Local destinations | Image |
|---|---|---|---|---|---|
| Aberdare bus station (on the site of Aberdare Low Level railway station) | Aberdare | 12 | Cardiff | Trecynon; Penywaun; Hirwaun; Rhigos; Cwmdare | |
| Abergavenny bus station | Abergavenny | 6 | Cardiff, Hereford | Cwmbran, Brecon, Abergavenny Circular, Mardy, Monmouth, Llanellen, Brynmawr, Hollywell Crescent (O/S 80), Pontrilas, Ashvale | |
| Aberystwyth bus station | Aberystwyth | 7 | Cardiff, Swansea, London | Cardigan; Llangollen; Machynlleth; Dolgellau; Bangor; Newtown | |
| Ammanford bus station | Ammanford | 6 | Swansea | Carmarthenshire; Pontardawe | |
| Bangor bus station | Bangor | 7 | Caernarfon, Aberystwyth, Holyhead | Llanberis, Penrhos Garnedd, Deiniolen, Parc Menai, Gwastadnant, Menai Bridge, Llangefni, Llangoed, Amlwch, Glan-yr-afon, Carmel, Llanddona, Maesgeirchen, Llandudno, Colwyn Bay | |
| Bargoed Interchange | Bargoed | 5 | Cardiff, Newport | Blackwood, Merthyr Tydfil, Caerphilly | |
| Barry Dock Interchange (adjacent to Barry Docks railway station) | Barry | 4 | None | Town districts | |
| Blackwood Interchange | Blackwood | 9 | Cardiff, Newport | Pontypridd, Cwmbran, Tredegar, Bargoed, Ystrad Mynach railway station, Wyllie, New Tredegar, Abertillery | |
| Bow Street Transport Interchange (at railway station) | Bow Street, Ceredigion | 1 | None | Aberystwyth, Bangor, Machynlleth, Ynyslas | |
| Brecon bus station | Brecon | 5 | Hereford | Hay-on-Wye; Brecon Beacons; Merthyr Tydfil; Abergavenny; Ystradgynlais | |
| Bridgend bus station | Bridgend | 11 | Cardiff, Port Talbot | Brackla; Sarn; Maesteg; Bridgend Designer Outlet; Porthcawl; Cowbridge | |
| Brynmawr bus station | Brynmawr | 4 | Cardiff, Newport | Town Districts, Abergavenny, Hereford, Ebbw Vale, Merthyr Tydfil | |
| Carmarthen bus station | Carmarthen | 10 | London, Swansea, Aberystwyth, Llanelli | Haverfordwest, Cardigan | |
| Caernarfon bus station | Caernarfon | 3 | Aberystwyth | Bangor; Llandudno; Porthmadog; Pwllheli | |
| Caerphilly bus station | Caerphilly | 11 | Cardiff | Bargoed; Newport; Blackwood, Town Districts | |
| Cardiff Coach Station | Cardiff Sophia Gardens | 9 | National Express services | Newport, Swansea | |
| Cardiff Bus Interchange | Cardiff city centre | 14 | Cardiff | City districts; Vale of Glamorgan | |
| Proposed Cardiff West Transport Interchange (also known as Western Transport Interchange) | Fairwater, Cardiff | TBC | Cardiff | City districts; park and ride | |
| Chepstow bus station | Chepstow | 5 | Newport; Bristol | Monmouth | |
| Cwmbran bus station | Cwmbran | 9 | London, Bristol, Newport, Cardiff | Pontypool; Abergavenny, Blackwood | |
| Ebbw Vale bus station | Ebbw Vale | 6 | Cardiff | Cwmbran railway station, Tredegar, Ashvale, Peacehaven, Cwm, Brynmawr, Abergavenny, Garn Lydan | |
| Gorseinon bus station | Gorseinon | 6 | Swansea; Llanelli | Lliw Valley | |
| Haverfordwest bus station | Haverfordwest | 6 | London Victoria, Aberystwyth, Newport, Cardigan, Rochdale | Withybush, Tenby, Tanerdy, Wiston, Broad Haven, Burton Ferry, Fishguard, Albert Town | |
| Llandrindod Wells Interchange | Llandrindod Wells | 4 | Cardiff | Aberystwyth, Builth Wells, Brecon, Merthyr Tydfil, Newtown, New Radnor, Kington, Hereford | |
| Llanelli bus station | Llanelli | 7 | Swansea, London | Town Districts, Ammanford, Carmarthen, Cross Hands, Pontarddulais, Hendy | |
| Llantwit Major bus station | Llantwit Major | 1 | Cardiff, Bridgend | Cowbridge, Talbot Green, St Athan, Barry, Rhoose, Ogmore-By-Sea, Ewenny, Marcross, Monknash, St. Donats, Cardiff Airport | |
| Maesteg bus station | Maesteg | 6 | Port Talbot; Bridgend; Cardiff | Caerau, Llangynwyd, Maesteg Circular, Cymmer | |
| Merthyr Tydfil bus station | Merthyr Tydfil | 14 | Cardiff, Swansea | Abergavenny; Brecon; Brecon Beacons; Hay-on-Wye; Hereford; South Wales Valleys | |
| Mold bus station | Mold | 7 | Chester | Wrexham | |
| Monmouth bus station | Monmouth | 2 | Newport, Hereford | Abergavenny, Ross-on-Wye, Chepstow, Wyesham, Over Monnow, Tintern, Osbaston | |
| Neath bus station | Neath | 11 | Swansea, Port Talbot | Vale of Neath; Skewen; Briton Ferry; Pontardawe | |
| Nelson bus station | Nelson, Caerphilly | 2 | None | Caerphilly, Blackwood, Pontypridd, Bargoed, Merthyr Tydfil | |
| Newport bus station | Newport | 24 + 1 | Newport (Market Square): Cardiff (X5); Severn Express to Bristol; Newport Kingsway (Stand K12): London Victoria and Heathrow Airport; Birmingham; Bristol Airport; Brighton; Hull; Swansea; Bradford; Liverpool; Monmouth | Newport (Friars Walk): City districts; Newport (Market Square): Allt-yr-yn; Brynglas; South Wales Valleys; Cwmbran | |
| Newtown bus station | Newtown | 5 | Shrewsbury, Wrexham | Welshpool, Montgomery, Machynlleth, Llangurig, Llanidloes, Rhayader, Llanllwchaiarn, Nantoer, Garth Owen | |
| Pontypridd bus station | Pontypridd | 12 | Cardiff | Caerphilly, Blackwood | |
| Port Talbot bus station | Port Talbot | 9 | Bridgend; Swansea; Cardiff; London | Neath; Porthcawl; Baglan; Afan Valley; Maesteg | |
| Port Talbot Parkway interchange (at railway station) | Port Talbot | 6 | Swansea | Aberavon, Bridgend, Goytre, Maesteg, Margam, Neath | |
| Porth Transport Hub (at railway station) | Porth | 7 | Cardiff | Rhondda Valleys, Pontypridd, Caerphilly | |
| Porthcawl bus station | Porthcawl | 3 | Cardiff | Aberdare, Bridgend, Cowbridge, Danygraig, Ferndale, Llwynypia, Maerdy, Newtown, Penygraig, Tonypandy, Tonyrefail, Tylorstown, Ystrad Rhondda | |
| Porthcawl Metrolink | Porthcawl | 4 | Cardiff | Aberdare, Bridgend, Cowbridge, Danygraig | |
| Pwllheli bus station | Pwllheli | 3 | Caernarfon | Porthmadog; Nefyn; Abersoch; Aberdaron | |
| Rhyl bus station | Rhyl | 5 | None | Llandudno, Colwyn Bay, Prestatyn, Denbigh, Bodelwyddan, Mount Pleasant, Bagillt, Kinmel Bay, Holywell, Bryhedydd Bay, Mill Bank Road | |
| Swansea bus station | Swansea | 23 | Cardiff; London | City districts; Gower; South West Wales | |
| Talbot Green bus station | Talbot Green | 4 | Cardiff, Bridgend | Llantwit Major, Tonypandy, Pontypridd, Ynysmaerdy | |
| Tonypandy bus station | Tonypandy | 4 | Cardiff, Bridgend | Porth, Blaencwm, Caerphilly, Porthcawl, Hendreforgan, Clydach Vale | |
| Tredegar bus station | Tredegar | 4 | Cardiff, Newport | Town Districts, Blackwood, Abergavenny, Hereford, Ebbw Vale, Merthyr Tydfil | |
| Wrexham bus station | Wrexham | 8 | Chester; London | Oswestry; Mold | |
| Ystradgynlais Interchange | Ystradgynlais | 5 | Swansea | Abercrave, Ammanford, Brecon, Brynamman, Coelbren, Crynant, Neath, Ynyswen | |

== See also ==
- Transport in Wales
- List of bus stations in London
- List of bus stations in England
- List of bus stations in Scotland
