= Cwmbran railway station (Great Western Railway) =

Former railway station in Wales

Coordinates: 51.64852°N 3.02326°W

Cwmbran

General information
- Location: Old Cwmbran, Torfaen; Wales
- Grid reference: ST294948
- Platforms: 2

Other information
- Status: Disused

History
- Original company: Great Western Railway
- Pre-grouping: Great Western Railway
- Post-grouping: Great Western Railway

Key dates
- 11 March 1880: Opened
- 30 April 1962: Closed to passengers
- 17 May 1965: Closed to all traffic
Location

Cwmbran railway station was a station in the old village of Cwmbran in Torfaen (now known as Old Cwmbran) in South Wales, UK.

== History ==
The station was opened on 11 March 1880 by the Great Western Railway as a replacement for the first Cwmbran station on the Monmouthshire Railway and Canal. This followed the Great Western's acquisition of the Monmouthshire Railway whose "Eastern Valley" line continued southward from Cwmbran Junction alongside the Monmouthshire Canal to Newport.

The station was on a line opened by the Great Western in 1878 to connect the Monmouthshire Railway with the Pontypool, Caerleon and Newport Railway at Llantarnam Junction. The Pontypool line, which opened in September 1874, had been built to relieve the congested Monmouthshire Railway and was absorbed by the Great Western in December 1874.

The site adjacent to Victoria Street is now a car park and a doctor's surgery. The present Cwmbran railway station was opened in 1986 on the opposite side of the town centre on the Pontypool, Caerleon and Newport line, which remains open as part of the Welsh Marches Line.

Preceding station	Disused railways	Following station
Upper Pontnewydd; Line and station closed	Great Western Railway; Pontypool, Caerleon and Newport Railway	Llantarnam; Line open, station closed
