= Upper Pontnewydd railway station =

Former railway station in Wales

Coordinates: 51.6616°N 3.0240°W

Upper Pontnewydd
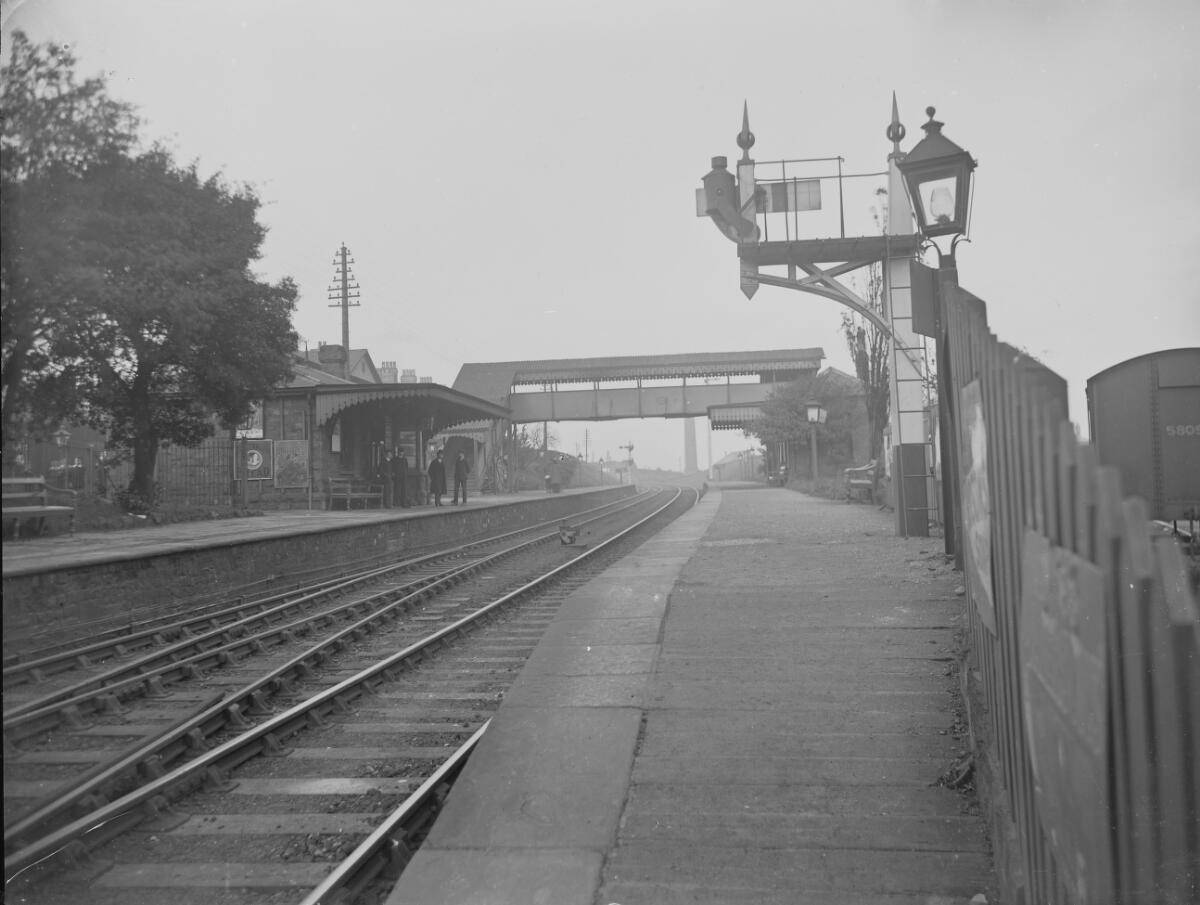
- Station c1905

General information
- Location: Pontnewydd, Torfaen; Wales
- Grid reference: ST292963
- Platforms: 2

Other information
- Status: Disused

History
- Original company: Monmouthshire Railway and Canal Company
- Pre-grouping: Great Western Railway
- Post-grouping: Great Western Railway

Key dates
- 1 July 1852: Opened as "Pontnewydd"
- 1 September 1881: Renamed "Upper Cwmbran"
- 4 November 1881: Renamed
- 30 April 1962: Closed to passengers
- 7 April 1969: Closed to goods
Location

Upper Pontnewydd railway station in Pontnewydd village, Cwmbran in Torfaen, South Wales, UK was part of the Monmouthshire Railway and Canal Company's Eastern Valley line from Newport to Blaenavon.

== History ==
The station was opened as "Pontnewydd" on 1 July 1852 by the Monmouthshire Railway and Canal Company. It was briefly known as "Upper Cwmbran" from 1 September 1881 until 4 November 1881 when it became "Upper Pontnewydd"; it is not however clear whether the "Upper Cwmbran" name was actually used. From 1874, the village was also served by Lower Pontnewydd on the Pontypool, Caerleon and Newport Railway. Upper Pontnewydd closed to passengers on 30 April 1962 and to goods on 7 April 1969.

The 2-platform station lay to the north of the Commercial Street road bridge, while the goods yard was to the south. Branch sidings served the Redbrook (Tynewydd) and Avondale tin plate works to the north east.

The A4051 Cwmbran Drive, built in the 1980s, largely follows the route of the dismantled railway.

Preceding station	Disused railways	Following station
Pontrhydyrun Halt; Line and station closed	Great Western Railway; Monmouthshire Railway and Canal Company	Cwmbran (MC&R); Line and station closed
Pontrhydyrun Halt; Line and station closed	Great Western Railway; Pontypool, Caerleon and Newport Railway	Cwmbran (GWR); Line and station closed
