= Llantarnam railway station =

Former railway station in Wales

Coordinates: 51.6372°N 3.0027°W

Llantarnam
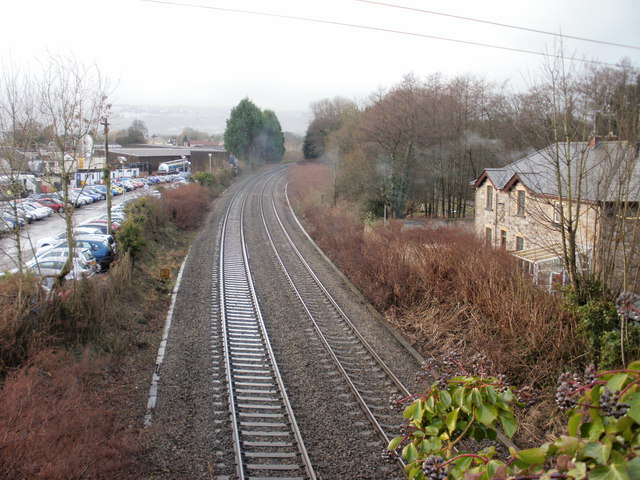
- Site of the station today

General information
- Location: Llantarnam, Torfaen; Wales
- Grid reference: ST307936
- Platforms: 2

Other information
- Status: Disused

History
- Original company: Pontypool, Caerleon and Newport Railway
- Pre-grouping: Great Western Railway
- Post-grouping: Great Western Railway

Key dates
- 21 December 1874: Opened
- 30 April 1962: Closed to passengers
- 7 September 1963: Closed to goods
Location

Llantarnam railway station in Llantarnam village, Cwmbran in Torfaen, South Wales, UK was built as part of the Pontypool, Caerleon and Newport Railway.

== History ==
The station was opened by the Pontypool, Caerleon and Newport Railway on 21 December 1874. The Great Western Railway advertised in January 1877 for tenders for the construction of a station and station yard at Pontygarnedd. Pont-y-carnedd is shown near the railway on the 1882 1:2,500 Ordnance Survey map, just to the north of Llanvihangel Llantarnam. It first appeared in Bradshaw in August 1878. The Monmouthshire Railway and Canal Company had opened a station with the same name on its line to Newport Mill Street on 1 July 1852; this closed on 11 March 1880 when the line was diverted.

The station closed to passengers on 30 April 1962, with the goods yard remaining in use until 7 September 1963.

The 2 platform station lay to the north of the current Newport Road bridge, and alongside the Burton's biscuit factory. Further north at Llantarnam Junction, the extension line built by the Great Western Railway, opened in April 1878, diverged to the north west towards Cwmbran (GWR) railway station. The former station is located on the Welsh Marches Line.

Preceding station	Historical railways	Following station
Lower Pontnewydd; Line open, station closed	Great Western Railway; Pontypool, Caerleon and Newport Railway	Ponthir; Line open, station closed
Cwmbran (GWR); Line and station closed	Great Western Railway; Pontypool, Caerleon and Newport Railway	Ponthir; Line open, station closed
