= Ponthir railway station =

Former railway station in Wales

Coordinates: 51.6293°N 2.9763°W

Ponthir
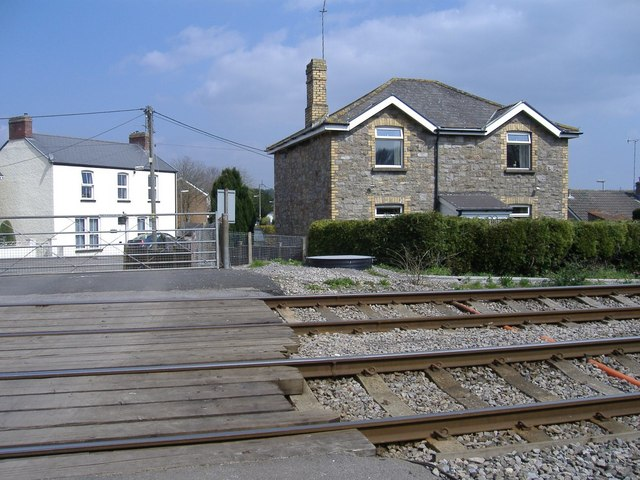
- Station house and level crossing at the site in 2007.

General information
- Location: Ponthir, Torfaen; Wales
- Grid reference: ST325927
- Platforms: 2

Other information
- Status: Disused

History
- Original company: Pontypool, Caerleon and Newport Railway
- Pre-grouping: Great Western Railway
- Post-grouping: Great Western Railway

Key dates
- 21 December 1874: Opened
- 9 June 1958: Closed to goods
- 30 September 1962: Closed to passengers
Location

Ponthir railway station was a railway station in the village of Ponthir in Torfaen, South Wales, UK.

== History ==
The station was opened by the Pontypool, Caerleon and Newport Railway on 21 December 1874 or 1 June 1878. The Great Western Railway advertised in The Cambrian on 12 January 1877 for Tenders for the construction of a station and station yard at Ponthir. Goods facilities were withdrawn on 9 June 1958 and the station was closed to passengers on 30 September 1962.

The original station buildings were demolished but the stationmaster's house is now a private dwelling and a level crossing on the site is still in use. The former station site is located on the Welsh Marches Line.

| Preceding station | Historical railways | Following station |
|---|---|---|
| Llantarnam; Line open, station closed | Great Western Railway; Pontypool, Caerleon and Newport Railway | Caerleon; Line open, station closed |
