= Lower Pontnewydd railway station =

Former railway station in Wales

Coordinates: 51.66019°N 3.01641°W

Lower Pontnewydd
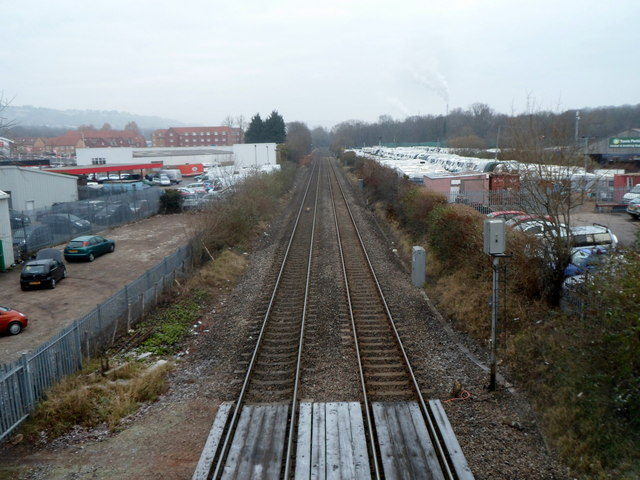
- Station site in 2012.

General information
- Location: Pontnewydd, Torfaen; Wales
- Grid reference: ST297962
- Platforms: 2

Other information
- Status: Disused

History
- Original company: Pontypool, Caerleon and Newport Railway
- Pre-grouping: Great Western Railway
- Post-grouping: Great Western Railway

Key dates
- 21 December 1874: Opened as "Pontnewydd"
- 1 January 1917: Closed
- 1 May 1919: Reopened
- 1 July 1925: Renamed
- 9 June 1958: Closed to passengers
- 25 January 1965: Closed to all traffic
Location

Lower Pontnewydd railway station was a railway station in the village of Pontnewydd in Torfaen, Wales. It was originally opened by the Pontypool, Caerleon and Newport Railway.

== History ==
The station was opened as "Pontnewydd" by the Pontypool, Caerleon and Newport Railway on 21 December 1874. After a period of temporary closure between 1917 and 1919, the station was renamed "Lower Pontnewydd" on 1 July 1925 to distinguish it from Upper Pontnewydd to the west on the Monmouthshire Railway and Canal. The station closed to passengers on 9 June 1958, with the goods yard remaining in use until 25 January 1965.

The site was to the north of the overbridge on Station Road. It is now partially used as a caravan storage business. The twin track line remains in use.

When Cwmbran railway station was reopened by British Rail on 12 May 1986, it was at a site 300m to the south of Lower Pontnewydd. The former station is on the Welsh Marches Line.

Preceding station	Historical railways	Following station
Panteg; Line open, station closed	Great Western Railway; Pontypool, Caerleon and Newport Railway	Llantarnam; Line open, station closed
