= Sebastopol railway station =

Former railway station in Wales

Coordinates: 51.6758°N 3.02075°W

Sebastopol
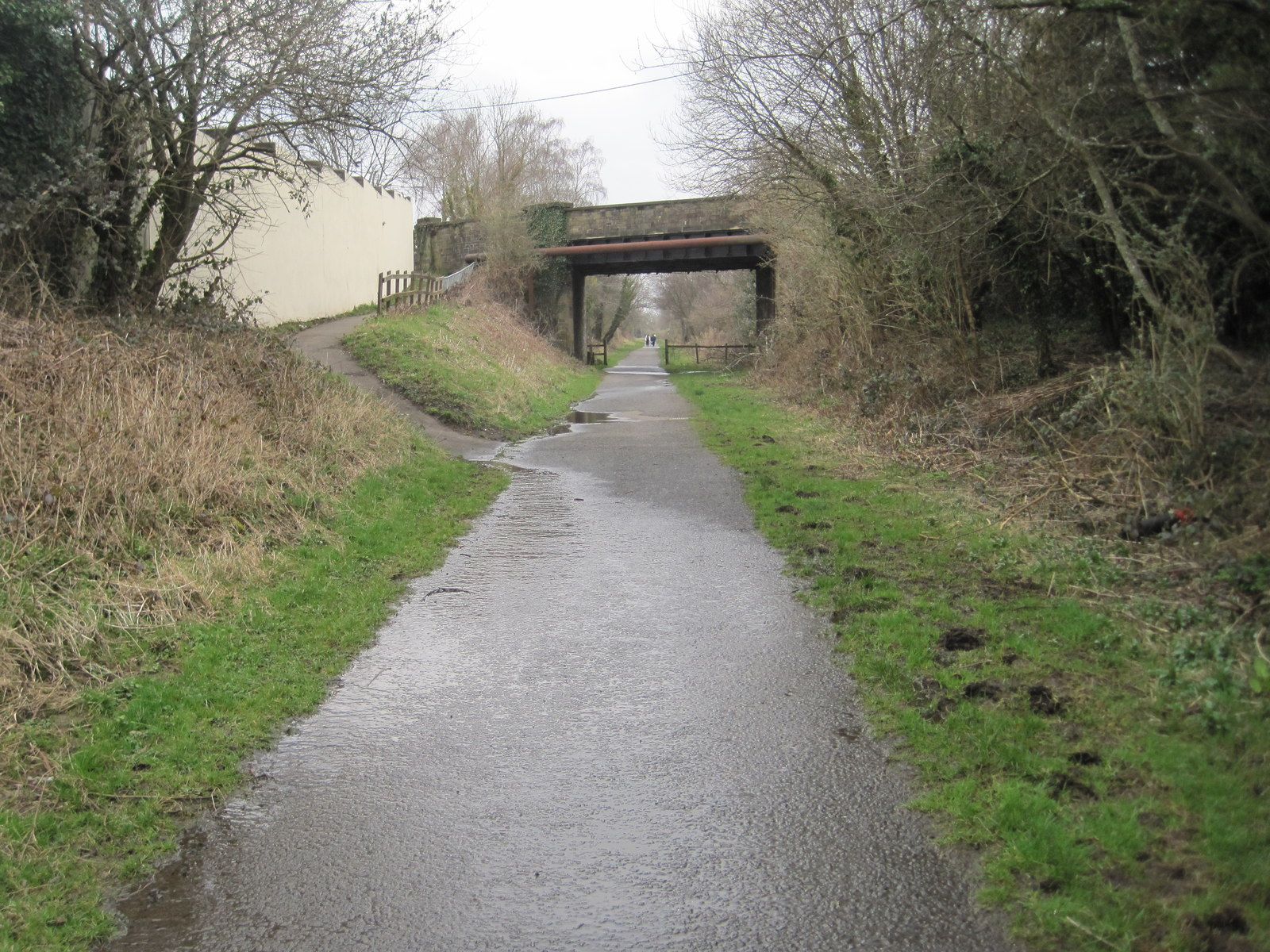
- The site of the station in 2015

General information
- Location: Sebastopol, Torfaen; Wales
- Grid reference: ST295980
- Platforms: 2

Other information
- Status: Disused

History
- Original company: Great Western Railway

Key dates
- 28 May 1928: Opened
- 30 April 1962: Closed
Location

Sebastopol railway station was a railway station which served the village of Sebastopol near Pontypool in Torfaen, South Wales, UK.

== History ==
The station was opened by the Great Western Railway on 28 May 1928 on its line from Pontypool to Newport. It closed on 30 April 1962.

The island platform station lay to the south west of the extant Avondale Road overbridge, parallel to Railway Terrace. There are no remains of the station today, but the trackbed has been redeveloped into a cyclepath as part of National Cycle Route 46.

The station was the second to have served the area as the Great Western had opened an earlier station on its Pontypool, Caerleon and Newport Railway in December 1875, which was initially known as Sebastopol but was later renamed "Panteg". This station closed in July 1880 when it was replaced by Panteg and Griffithstown on the Monmouthshire Railway.

Preceding station	Disused railways	Following station
Panteg and Griffithstown; Line and station closed	Great Western Railway; Monmouthshire Railway and Canal Company	Pontrhydyrun Halt; Line and station closed
