= Cwmbran bus station =

Bus terminus and interchange in Cwmbran, Wales

Cwmbran bus station Gorsaf bws Cwmbrân
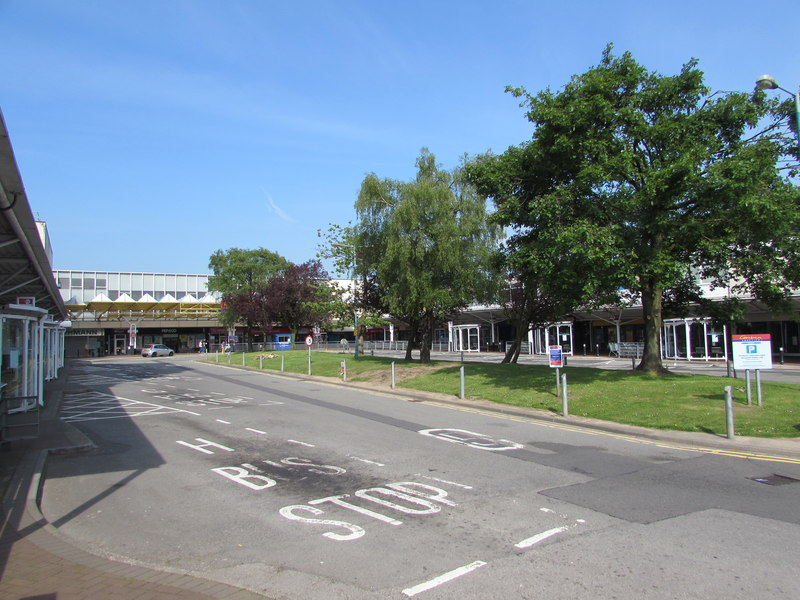
- Cwmbran bus station in May 2016

General information
- Location: Cwmbran Bus Station; Gwent Square; Cwmbran; NP44 1XN; Torfaen; Wales
- Coordinates: 51.66490°N 3.19579°W
- System: Bus station
- Owner: Cwmbran Centre
- Operator: Cwmbran Centre
- Bus routes: 20
- Bus stands: 8
- Bus operators: Stagecoach in South Wales; Newport Bus; Phil Anslow Travel
- Connections: Cwmbran railway station

Construction
- Structure type: Shelter
- Parking: None
- Cycle facilities: Racks
- Accessible: Level boarding

Other information
- Station code: torajmt
- Fare zone: 2 (Newport Bus zoning)
- Website: traveline.info stagecoachbus.com

History
- Opened: 1958
Location

Cwmbran bus station (Welsh: Gorsaf bws Cwmbrân) is a bus terminus and interchange located in the town centre of Cwmbran, South Wales.

== Background ==
The station was commissioned along with the wider development of the town of Cwmbran in August 1949, following the end of the Second World War. The UK embarked on a series of new towns in order to meet high demand for housing and employment, particularly in war ravaged communities.

Under the New Towns Act 1946, Cwmbran became the first New Town in Wales. A body, Cwmbran Development Corporation, was created to oversee work. A 55-acre town centre was designed, and the bus station was the key interchange for both the retail and residential area.

== Layout ==
The bus station diverts from the circular Glyndwr Road around the town, just after the roundabout on St David's Road.

The station has eight bus stands, identified with letters A-H.

It is surrounded by the retail centre, Cwmbran Centre, and opposite is the newer Leisure @ Cwmbran development which includes restaurants, a bowling centre, and a cinema.

== Destinations ==
Cwmbran is the terminus for a number of Stagecoach services due to the local depot in the town, and serves as an interchange for travellers headed north or south.

List of destinations
Operator	Number	Origin	Stand	Destination	Journey time	Frequency
Stagecoach	1 gold	Cwmbran	C	Thornhill	12 minutes	10–60 minutes
Phil Anslow Travel	X1	Cwmbran	H	Brynmawr	54 minutes	Every 60 minutes
Phil Anslow Travel	X1	Cwmbran	H	Abertillery	36 minutes	Every 60 minutes
Stagecoach	2 gold	Cwmbran	H	Croesyceiliog	10 minutes	Every 15 minutes
Stagecoach	X3	Cardiff	B	Hereford	108 minutes	5 per day
Stagecoach	X3	Hereford	B	Cardiff	57 minutes	5 per day
Stagecoach	X3	Cardiff	B	Abergavenny	108 minutes	11 per day
Stagecoach	X3	Abergavenny	B	Cardiff	57 minutes	11 per day
Stagecoach	X3	Cardiff	B	Pontypool	108 minutes	16 per day
Stagecoach	X3	Pontypool	B	Cardiff	57 minutes	16 per day
Stagecoach	5a gold	Cwmbran	D	Fairwater	6 minutes	Every 30 minutes
Stagecoach	5c gold	Cwmbran	D	Fairwater	11 minutes	Every 30 minutes
Stagecoach	6 gold	Cwmbran	D	Henllys	12 minutes	15 to 60 minutes
Stagecoach	7 gold	Cwmbran	B	Coed Eva	8 minutes	Every 15 minutes
Capitol Hire	15	Trevethin	A	Newport Market Square	15 minutes	Various
Capitol Hire	15	Newport Market Square	F	Trevethin	14 minutes	Various
Capitol Hire	15	Newport Market Square	F	Pontypool	17 minutes	Various
Capitol Hire	15	Pontypool	A	Newport Market Square	15 minutes	Various
Stagecoach	21	Cwmbran	E	Blackwood Interchange	54 minutes	Every 60 minutes
Stagecoach	23	Cwmbran	F	Varteg	42 minutes	Every 30 minutes
Stagecoach	24	Newport Market Square	E	Blaenavon	33 minutes	Every 60 minutes
Stagecoach	24	Blaenavon	A	Newport Market Square	10 minutes	Various
Stagecoach	X24 gold	Blaenavon	A	Newport Market Square	34 minutes	Every 30 minutes
Stagecoach	X24 gold	Newport Market Square	E	Blaenavon	39 minutes	Every 30 minutes
Phil Anslow Travel	30	Cwmbran	F	Blaenavon	57 minutes	Every 60 minutes
Phil Anslow Travel	63	Cwmbran	F	Chepstow	65 minutes	4 per day

*21 bus continues from Pontypool to Cwmbran most hours.

== Connecting transport ==
Cwmbran railway station provides rail transport to destinations on the Welsh Marches line, including Cardiff Central, Newport, Manchester, Maesteg, Swansea, Carmarthen, and Milford Haven. The station is a seven-minute walk from the bus station.

The area also has a large number of car parking facilities, some included in the shopping centre, as well as around the town.

== See also ==
- List of bus stations in Wales
- Transport in Wales
