= Pontnewydd =

District of Cwmbran, Torfaen, Wales

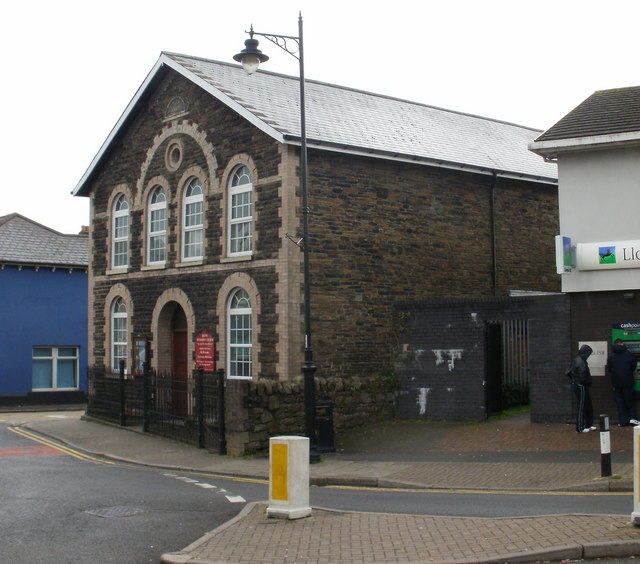
- Hope Methodist Church

- Location within Torfaen
- Area: 2.36 km^{2} (0.91 sq mi)
- Population: 6,305 (2011)
  - Density: 2,672/km^{2} (6,920/sq mi)
- OS grid reference: ST 291 963
- Community: Pontnewydd
- Principal area: Torfaen
- Preserved county: Gwent
- Country: Wales
- Sovereign state: United Kingdom
- Post town: CWMBRAN
- Postcode district: NP44
- Dialling code: 01633
- Police: Gwent
- Fire: South Wales
- Ambulance: Welsh
- UK Parliament: Torfaen
- Senedd Cymru – Welsh Parliament: Torfaen
- List of places UK Wales Torfaen 51.662840°N 3.020681°W Map of the community

Pontnewydd is a suburb of Cwmbran in the county borough of Torfaen, south-east Wales. It should not be confused with Pontnewynydd in nearby Pontypool.

An 18th-century settlement within the historical parish of Llanfrechfa Upper, Pontnewydd became an important part of the Industrial Revolution in the Eastern Valley of South Wales. The canal, railway and river (Afon Llwyd) encouraged Victorian industries to flourish in this area which resulted in a steady rise in population.

Pontnewydd is both a community and an electoral ward of Torfaen County Borough Council. The electoral ward also includes Northville. The community had a population of 4,954 in 2011 and includes the Sebastopol area of Pontypool.

== Cwmbran New Town ==
Cwmbran was designated as a new town under the New Towns Act 1946, with the aim of housing new workers to the growing post-war industries that landscaped the valley. After the Second World War, Cwmbran's population was 12,000 - living in the original settlements surrounding what is now known as Old Cwmbran; Upper Cwmbran, Pontnewydd, Pontrhydyrun, Forge Hammer, Croes-y-ceiliog, Oakfield, Llantarnam, Llanfrechfa and Henllys.

== Environment ==
The Monmouthshire & Brecon Canal is the main environmental feature to Pontnewydd. The area also hosts a golf course (opened in 1875 and is one of the oldest in Wales), parks, rugby football and social clubs, several churches and pubs, cenotaph (opened in 1925) and two community hubs (the original 20th-century village and the New Town 1950s neighbourhood west of Pontnewydd).

== Industry ==
For 200 years the area was dominated by heavy industry, revolving around the local coal, iron, brick and tin plate works. In 1802 George Conway and Edward Jenkins of Ynys-Pen-llwch in Glamorgan, built a tin-works on the side of the Afon Llwyd at Lower Pontnewydd. In 1804 a similar works was established higher up the river at Pontrhydyrun, by John Conway, eldest son of George Conway. The Pontnewydd Works declined with the death of Charles Conway in 1884. Pontrhydyrun manufactured tinplate until 1930. The Tynewydd Tinworks opened by Charles Roberts in 1875 alongside Upper Pontnewydd Station and other tinworks established by H.D.Griffiths, later taken over by the Avondale Company in 1894. By 1832 Llantarnam Abbey and its estate was owned by Reginald James Blewitt MP. He opened the Porthmawr Colliery in Upper Cwmbran, later known as the Mine Slope. The Adit followed in 1879. At its peak the colliery was employing over 1000 men before closing in 1927. In 1840, John Lawrence erected a blast furnace on the side of the Monmouthshire Canal. By 1865 the Nut and Bolt works of Weston and Grice, and the ironworks of William Roper had been established further along the canal. By 1902 the entire site was owned by Guest, Keen and Nettlefolds in what became known as Forge Hammer. The works closed in 1980. Since the New Town, Pontnewydd has lost all that heritage to light industry in Avondale, Springvale and Somerset Road.

== Transport ==
The Monmouthshire & Brecon Canal was constructed in the 1790s and Pontnewydd grew as a settlement from that. The Monmouthshire Railway and Canal Company railway line from Newport to Blaenafon also ran through Pontnewydd from the 1850s until it was replaced by Cwmbran Drive (A4051) in 1988. The railway was such an important asset to the community that there were two stations just 300 metres away from each other; Upper Pontnewydd railway station (1852-1962) and Lower Pontnewydd railway station on the still-running Pontypool, Caerleon and Newport Railway (1874-1958).

== Census data ==
At the 2011 census, the population for the ward was 6305 (Torfaen 91,075), and the community population was 4,954.

At the 2001 census, the following information was collected for the ward:

- Population 6132 (Torfaen 90,949). The community population was 4725.
- 47.9% Male, 52.1% Female
- Age Structure
  - 21.9% aged between 0 and 15
  - 37.2% aged between 16 and 44
  - 19.0% aged 45–59/64
  - 21.9% of pensionable age
