= Pontrhydyrun Halt railway station =

Former railway station in Wales

Pontrhydyrun Halt
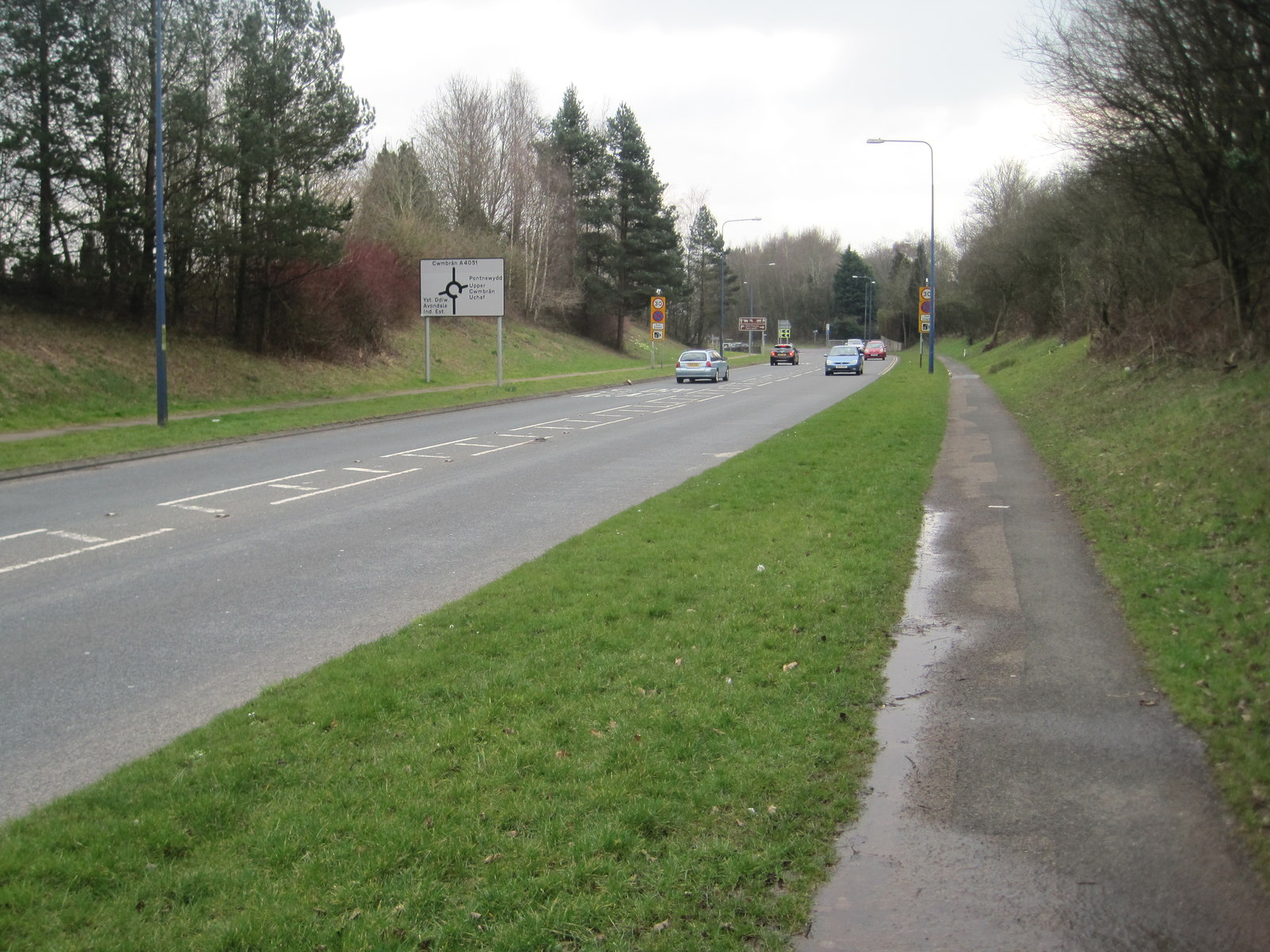
- The site of the station in 2015

General information
- Location: Pontrhydyrun, Torfaen; Wales
- Grid reference: ST294971
- Platforms: 2

Other information
- Status: Disused

History
- Original company: Great Western Railway

Key dates
- 17 July 1933: Opened
- 30 April 1962: Closed
Location

Pontrhydyrun Halt railway station was a railway halt which served the village of Pontrhydyrun near Cwmbran in Torfaen, South Wales, UK.

== History ==
The station was opened by the Great Western Railway on 17 July 1933 on its line from Pontypool to Newport. It closed on 30 April 1962.

The 2 platform request halt lay along the current A4051 road, Cwmbran Drive, which largely follows the trackbed of the Monmouthshire Railway's Eastern Valley line.

The station was the second to serve the area as a previous station named "Pontrhydyrun", which was situated 19 chains (380 m) to the north (51.671814°N 3.021381°W), had been opened by the Monmouthshire Railway on 1 July 1852 and closed on 1 January 1917.

Preceding station	Disused railways	Following station
Sebastopol; Line and station closed	Great Western Railway; Monmouthshire Railway and Canal Company	Upper Pontnewydd; Line and station closed
