= Llantarnam Grange Arts Centre =

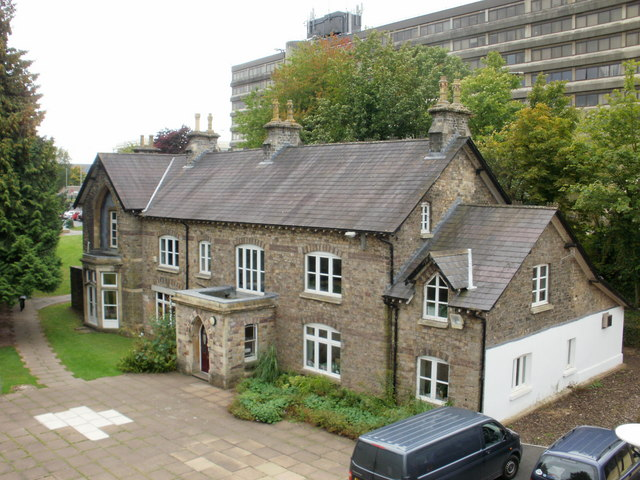
- Established: 1966
- Location: Cwmbran, Wales, United Kingdom
- Coordinates: 51.65°N 3.02°W
- Type: Arts centre
- Owner: Llantarnam Grange Arts Centre Ltd
- Website: www.lgac.org.uk

Llantarnam Grange Arts Centre (Welsh: Canolfan Celfyddydau Llantarnam Grange) is located within a 19th-century Victorian manor house in Cwmbran and is the regional centre for the applied arts in south-east Wales. It presents exhibitions promoting the applied arts, and extensive education and participation schemes of work to the local community.

The arts centre is a registered charity governed via a voluntary board of trustees and is a revenue-funded client of the Arts Council of Wales. It holds a service level agreement with the local Torfaen County Borough Council. Additional funding comes from Monmouthshire County Council, Cwmbran Community Council, Croesyceiliog & Llanyrafon Community Council and independent trusts and foundations.

== Background ==
Llantarnam Grange is on the site of a much earlier property owned by Llantarnam Abbey, called Gelli Las. Some time after 1871 it became a farmhouse known as Llantarnam Grange. When the last occupier died in 1952, the building was purchased by Cwmbrân Development Corporation, becoming a postal sorting office. In April 1966, it reopened as Llantarnam Grange Societies Club. It was a place for club meetings, theatre performances and art exhibitions before being taken over as an arts centre by the trustees of Llantarnam Grange in 1983.

The centre celebrated its 50th anniversary in 2016.

== The main gallery and gallery 2 ==
The main gallery and gallery 2 house six temporary exhibitions throughout the year (featuring sculpture, ceramics, jewellery, textiles, paintings, photography and printmaking). At various times exhibitions of work from the local community are also displayed.

Llantarnam Grange normally holds as many as 24 original exhibitions every year and, between 2011 and 2014, saw visitor numbers increase by one third.

== Family Group sculpture ==
Family Group by David Horn, 1965

Located directly outside the centre is the Family Group sculpture by David Horn. The fibreglass sculpture representing "a family group facing the stresses and strains of growth in a new community" was presented to the people of Cwmbran by the Cwmbran Arts Trust. It was unveiled by Leo Abse MP on 23 September 1965. It was relocated outside the arts centre in 2001.

Originally, the sculpture stood on a cobblestone base within a spiral walkway at the end of The Parade, near the south-east corner of General Rees Square. Unloved by the local population, it is currently in a state of disrepair caused by vandalism to the fibreglass and graffiti.
