= Bargoed Interchange =

Bus terminus and interchange in Bargoed, Wales

Bargoed Interchange Cyfnewidfa Bargod
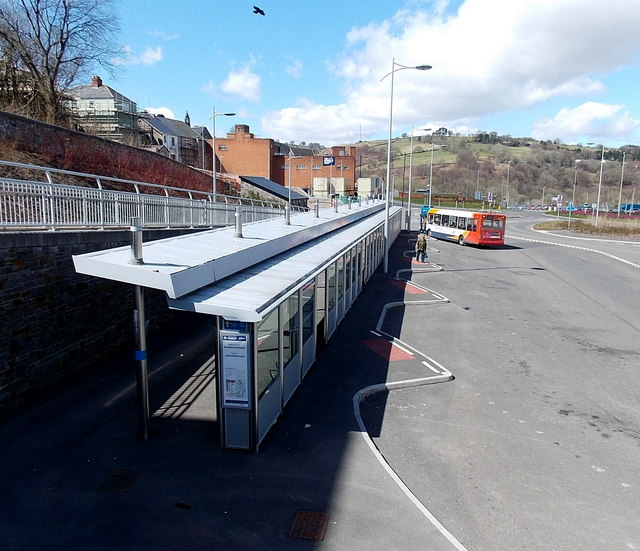
- Bargoed Interchange, officially opened in June 2011

General information
- Location: Bargoed Bus Station; Station Road; Bargoed; CF81 9AL; Caerphilly; Wales
- Coordinates: 51.691343°N 3.228545°W
- System: Bus station
- Owner: Caerphilly County Borough Council
- Operator: Caerphilly County Borough Council
- Bus routes: 8
- Bus stands: Total: 5 stands
- Bus operators: Stagecoach in South Wales, NAT Group, Harris Coaches
- Connections: Newport bus station, Merthyr Tydfil, Blackwood Interchange, Caerphilly, Pontypridd, Ystrad Mynach

Construction
- Structure type: Modern steel and glass passenger shelter, toilets and a new pedestrian link to High Street
- Parking: None
- Cycle facilities: Racks
- Accessible: Level boarding

Other information
- Station code: cpyjpjw
- Website: https://www.traveline.info/

History
- Opened: 11 June 2011
Location

Bargoed Interchange (Welsh: Cyfnewidfa Bargod) is a bus station located in the town centre of Bargoed, South Wales. It is situated near the High Street.

== Background ==
The new station building was funded through the European Union Regional Development Fund, and through the Welsh Government's Targeted Match Funding, Transport Grant programme, and the Heads of the Valleys Programme.

== Layout ==
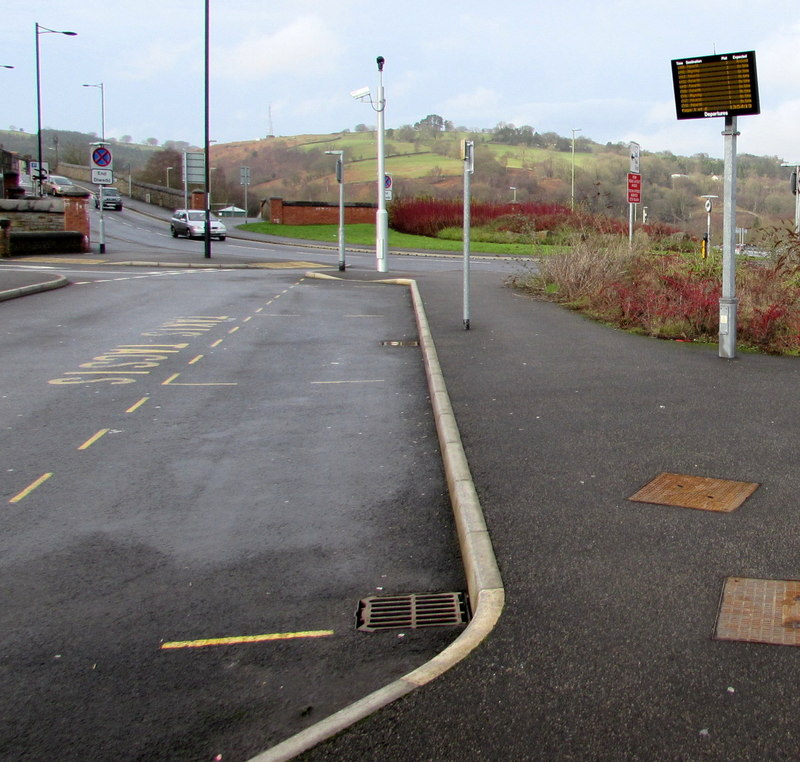
An electronic display board at Bargoed Interchange

The toilet facilities closed in April 2019 due to the increasing financial difficulties faced by Caerphilly Council. Caerphilly Town Centre public toilets re-opened in July 2019 but the fate of facilities in Blackwood remain uncertain.

The station was covered by Caerphilly Council's Public Space Protection Orders issued in 2015, which introduced Community Safety Wardens empowered to issue fixed penalty notices of £100 for any incidents of anti-social activities at the station, including any "disorderly, indecent or offensive" behaviour including loitering. The orders also apply to bus stations in Blackwood and Nelson, and the train and bus station areas in Caerphilly. Bargoed Bus Station has previously suffered from a high number of reports related to youth anti-social behaviour.

== Destinations ==
Bargoed services run to Newport, Merthyr Tydfil, Blackwood, Caerphilly, Pontypridd, and Ystrad Mynach.

List of destinations
Operator	Number	Service begins at	Stand	Service destination	Journey time	Frequency
Stagecoach	C9	Bargoed	3	Caerphilly	38 minutes	Hourly
Harris Coaches	14	Bargoed	2	Blackwood	25 minutes	Every 30 minutes
Harris Coaches	C17	Bargoed	5	Caerphilly	42 minutes	Every 60 minutes
Harris Coaches & Stagecoach	C18	Bargoed	5	Gilfach	42 minutes	Hourly
Stagecoach	27	Bargoed	1	Blackwood	23 minutes	Hourly
Harris Coaches	X38	Bargoed	5	Pontypridd via Nelson	43 minutes	Hourly
Stagecoach	50	Bargoed	4	Newport bus station	86 minutes	Hourly (Evenings)
Stagecoach	51	Caerphilly	1	Merthyr Tydfil	59 minutes	Hourly
Stagecoach	53	Caerphilly	1	Merthyr Tydfil	65 minutes	Hourly

== Rail transport ==
Bargoed railway station is 200 metres (220 yd) north of the bus interchange, providing fast transfer to the following:

Rhymney line

- Rhymney railway station (17 minutes)
- Caerphilly railway station (22 minutes)
- Cardiff Queen Street railway station (37 minutes)
- Cardiff Central railway station (43 minutes)

Penarth branch line

- Penarth railway station (61 minutes)
