= Blackwood Interchange =

Bus station in Blackwood, Wales

Blackwood Interchange Cyfnewidfa Coed Duon
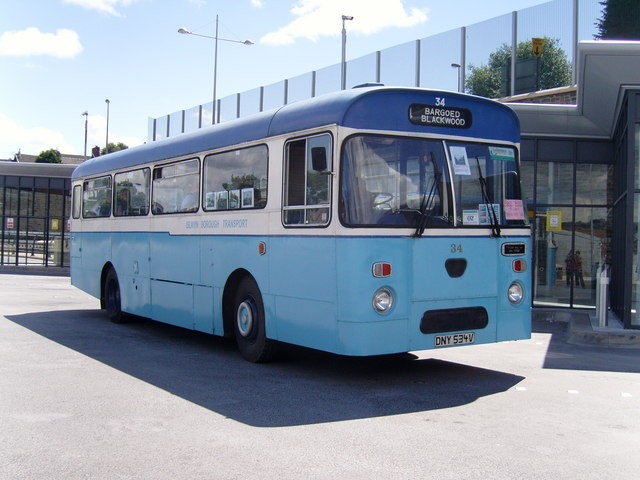
- An Islwyn Borough Transport bus at the rebuilt Blackwood Bus Station

General information
- Location: Blackwood Bus Station; Gordon Road; Blackwood; NP12 1AA; Caerphilly; Wales
- Coordinates: 51.66490°N 3.19579°W
- System: Bus station
- Owner: Caerphilly County Borough Council
- Operator: Caerphilly County Borough Council
- Bus routes: 16
- Bus stands: 9
- Bus operators: Stagecoach in South Wales, Caerphilly County Borough Council, Harris Coaches
- Connections: Cardiff, Newport, Pontypridd, Cwmbran, Tredegar, Bargoed, Wyllie, New Tredegar, Abertillery

Construction
- Structure type: Glass facade building with cafe and waiting room
- Parking: None
- Cycle facilities: Racks
- Accessible: Level boarding

Other information
- Station code: cpygawj
- Website: https://www.traveline.info/

History
- Opened: 14 November 2007
Location

Blackwood Interchange (Welsh: Cyfnewidfa Coed Duon) is a bus station located in the town centre of Blackwood, Caerphilly, South Wales. It is situated on Gordon Road adjacent to the High Street.

== Background ==
The existing Blackwood Bus Station redeveloped by Caerphilly County Borough Council in 2007. The project cost an approximate £2.4 million.

During development, traders in the town centre voiced concerns that "customers will be put off walking through the market when contractors move in" however Councillors reassured concerned individuals with the prospect of a reduction in the business rate for affected businesses.

Architect Geraint Jones, unusually, was an internal developer from within Caerphilly Council's own department, at a time where most civic developments in the UK are designed by private practices.

The redevelopment of Blackwood Bus Station was judged by Caerphilly Council as successful, helping to end the anti social behaviour associated with the previous concrete structure station, and it has encouraged the subsequent development of the town in the form of new retail units on its periphery and the new Sirhowy Enterprise Way area.

== Awards ==
The 2007 redevelopment won a number of awards nationally, including:

- Welsh Local Government Association Building of the Year 2007 (at the time named the Consortium of Local Authorities in Wales)
- RICS Wales Regeneration Award 2008
- ICE Wales Roy Edwards Award 2008

== Layout ==
The bus station is a glass façade terminal building including café, waiting area, canteen, offices and welfare facilities.

The stand doors provide access to buses, which park next to the gate on arrival, and then reverse out on departure. It is fully covered from the weather.

The station offers a café, named The Plaza, and used to offer public toilet facilities within the station building. The toilet facilities closed in April 2019 due to the increasing financial difficulties faced by Caerphilly Council. Caerphilly Town Centre public toilets re-opened in July 2019 but the fate of facilities in Blackwood remain uncertain. A proposed development, Blackwood Artisan Markets, and the accompanying apartment project, have offered to provide alternative toilets.

== Destinations ==
Blackwood lies as a stop on the Tredegar to Newport route, as well as offering a number of other destinations which begin in the town. These include Pontypridd, New Tredegar, Abertillery and Cardiff.

List of destinations
Operator	Number	Service begins at	Stand	Service destination	Journey time	Frequency
Stagecoach in South Wales	5	Blackwood	8	Pantside	33 minutes	Every hour
connect2	5A	Blackwood	8	Oakdale	22 minutes	3 trips a day
Harris Coaches	6	Blackwood	1	Wyllie	13 minutes	Every hour
Harris Coaches	7	Blackwood	5	Pontypridd	55 minutes	Every hour
Harris Coaches	8	Blackwood	4	Grove Park	17 minutes	Every hour
Harris Coaches	9	Blackwood	1	Penllwyn	10 minutes	Every hour
Harris Coaches	11	Blackwood	5	Gelligaer	27 minutes	Every hour
Harris Coaches	12	Blackwood	2	New Tredegar	32 minutes	Every 30 minutes
connect2	13	Blackwood	8	Manmoel	15 minutes	1 trip a day
Harris Coaches	14	Blackwood	2	Bargoed Interchange	28 minutes	Every 30 minutes
Stagecoach in South Wales	21	Blackwood	3	Cwmbran	54 minutes	Every hour
Stagecoach in South Wales	26	Ebbw Vale	5 & 8	Cardiff	2hrs 55	Every hour
Harris Coaches	27	Blackwood	3	Bargoed Interchange	28 minutes	Every hour
Stagecoach in South Wales	56	Newport	3 & 7	Tredegar	30 minutes	Every hour
Stagecoach in South Wales	151	Blackwood	6	Newport Bus Station	51 minutes	Every 15 minutes
Stagecoach in South Wales	X21	Blackwood	3	Cwmbran	54 minutes	Peak times only

== Rail transport ==
Blackwood railway station closed in 1965. There was previously a Rail linc bus that provided travel to nearby Ystrad Mynach railway station. This ceased in 2023.

Professor Mark Barry, who has consulted the Welsh Government on the South Wales Metro project, has written about the potential for Blackwood railway station to reopen as part of a tram-train system connecting other valleys towns from east to west.
