= Thornhill, Torfaen =

Village in Wales

Coordinates: 51.6578°N 3.0505°W

Thornhill (Welsh: Bryneithin) is a large council estate on the western side of Cwmbran, Torfaen in Wales. It is adjacent to the suburbs of Greenmeadow and Upper Cwmbran and represents the most economically-improved area of Cwmbran and in the wider Torfaen area. The estate is large and sprawling, built in the mid-1970s as temporary housing during the redevelopment of Pillgwenlly (Pill Newport). The residents liked the houses and never left. It is built around the original Thornhill farm house, which is still situated in the middle of the estate. The farm originally farmed pigs, and the woodland now surrounding the main estate has remains of the old walls and pig sties. The estate is divided into small cul de sacs that are named after Welsh rivers or lakes, the infamous Monnow Court being one of them. The main thoroughfare is Hafren Road (Hafren is Welsh for the River Severn).

At the centre of the estate is a small shopping precinct which is home to a convenience store, newsagent, fish and chip shop, and chemist.
