= Connor Edwards =

Welsh rugby union footballer

- Born: Connor Edwards; 28 June 1997 (age 29) Cwmbran, Wales
- Height: 185 cm (6 ft 1 in)
- Weight: 104 kg (16 st 5 lb)
- School: Newport High School

Rugby union career
- Position: Inside Centre
- Current team: Dragons
Senior career
Years	Team	Apps	(Points)
2015-	Dragons	20	(5)
- Correct as of 16:10, 12 July 2018 (UTC)

Connor Edwards (born 28 June 1997) is a Welsh rugby union player who plays for Dragons as a centre.

Edwards made his debut for the Dragons in 2015 having previously played for the Dragons academy, Bedwas RFC and Cross Keys RFC.
