= Cwmbran railway station =

Railway station in Torfaen, Wales

Cwmbran Welsh: Cwmbrân
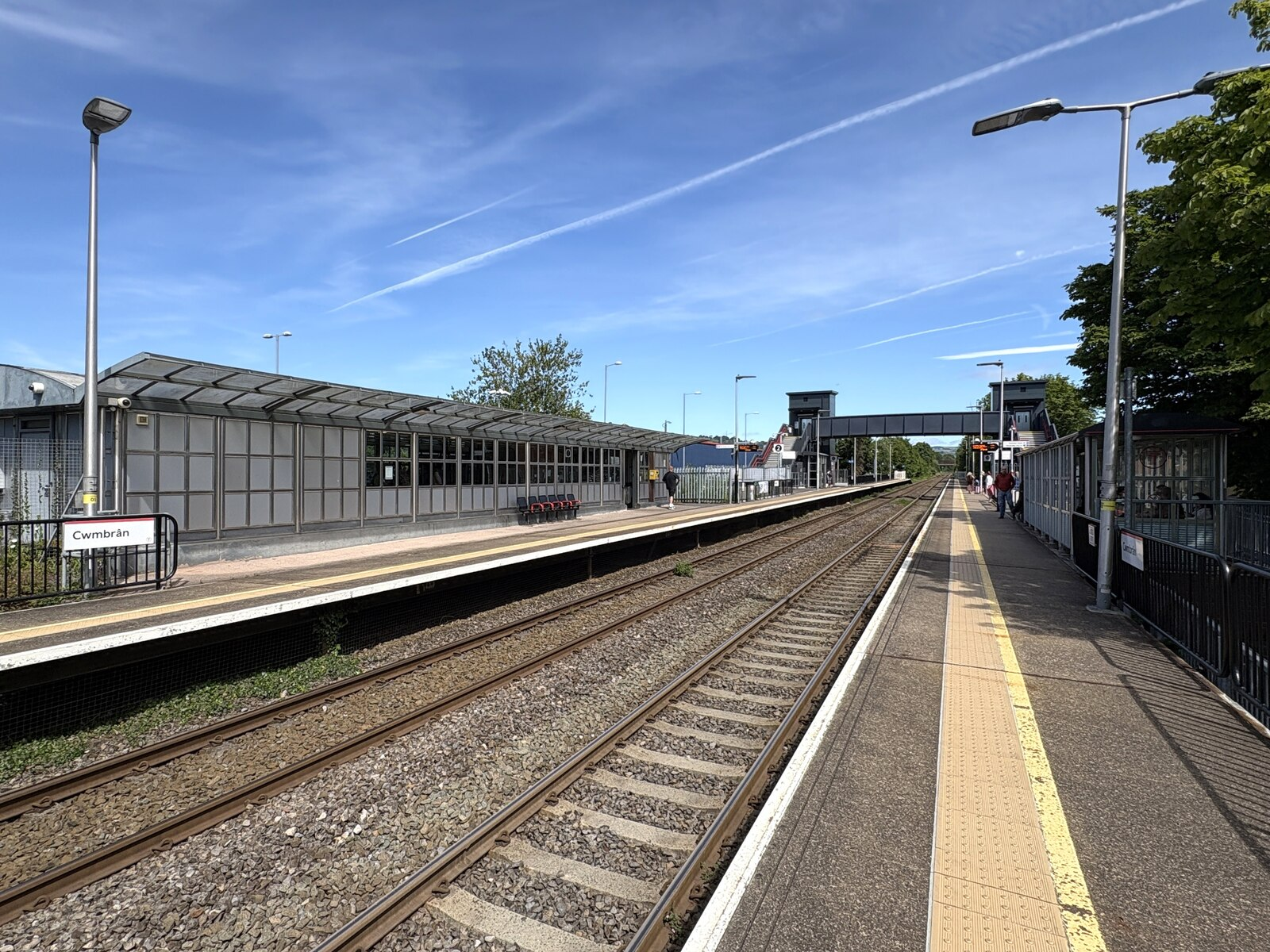

General information
- Location: Cwmbran, Torfaen, Wales
- Coordinates: 51.6572°N 3.0160°W
- Grid reference: ST298958
- Manager: Transport for Wales
- Platforms: 2

Other information
- Station code: CWM
- Classification: DfT category E

History
- Opened: 12 May 1986

Passengers
- 2020/21: ▼0.107 million
- 2021/22: ▲0.263 million
- 2022/23: ▲0.353 million
- 2023/24: ▲0.385 million
- 2024/25: ▲0.432 million
Location
Notes
- Passenger statistics from the Office of Rail and Road

Cwmbran railway station (Welsh: Gorsaf Rheilffordd Cwmbrân) serves the town of Cwmbran, in Torfaen, Wales; it lies five minutes' walking distance to the north-east of the town centre. It is managed by Transport for Wales, which operates all trains serving it. It is a stop on the Welsh Marches Line between Newport and Hereford. The station was opened at this site in 1986 to serve the commuter route to Newport and Cardiff Central, and shoppers to the town centre.

== History ==
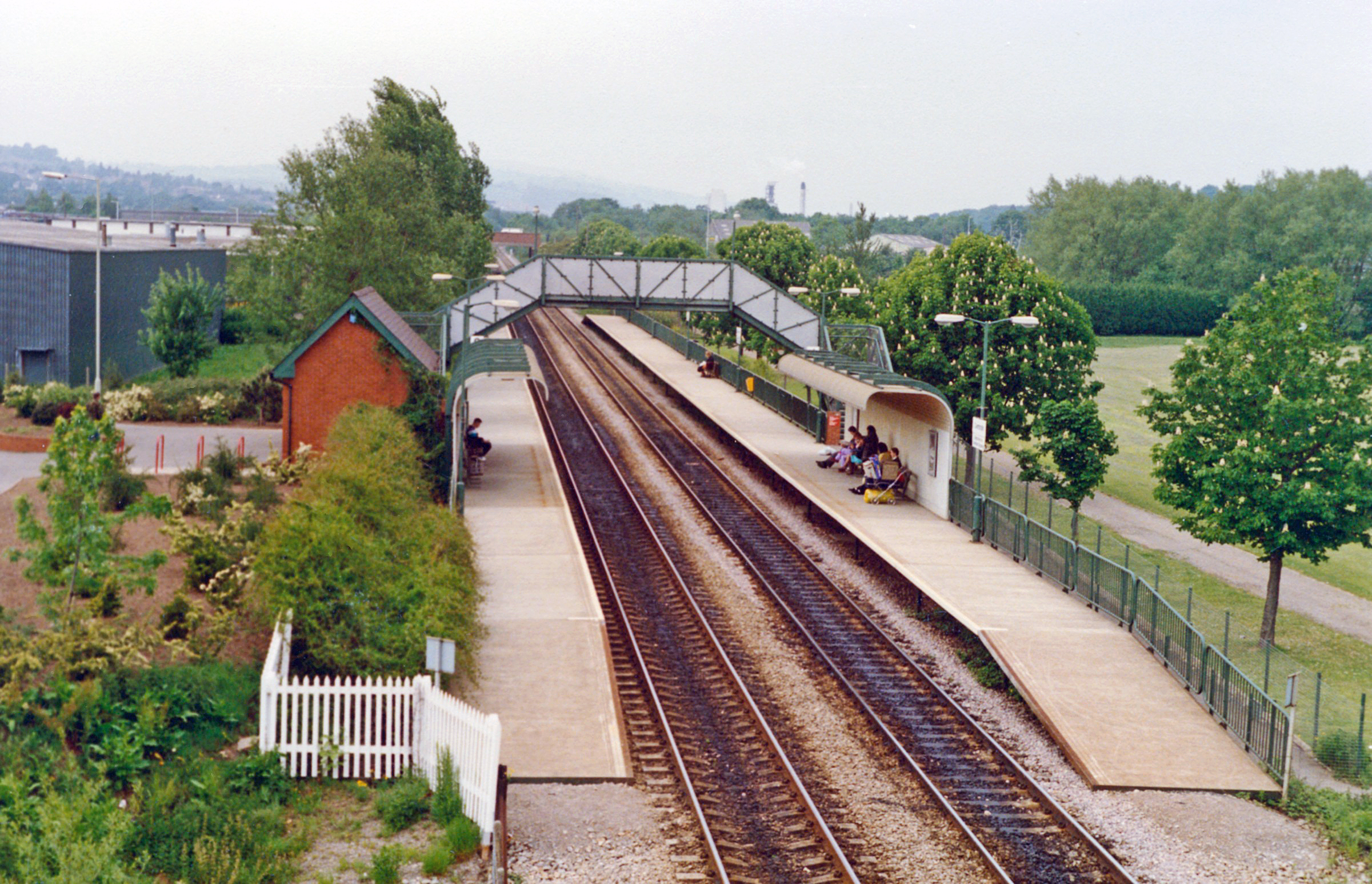
The station in 1990

Historically, a number of railway stations served Cwmbran. The first station was opened by the Monmouthshire Railway and Canal Company in July 1852; this closed on 11 March 1880 and a new station was opened on the same day by the Great Western Railway. It was located on a spur which linked the Monmouthshire Railway with the Pontypool, Caerleon and Newport Railway. This was closed to passengers on 30 April 1962 and to goods on 17 May 1965. The first station, which had remained open for goods traffic, also closed on 17 May 1965.

The Monmouthshire Railway line to Blaenavon ran to the west of the town. The section between Pontypool and Blaenavon closed to passengers 30 April 1962, the mineral branches followed on 7 April 1969 and the branch to Talywain on 3 May 1980. The section from Pontypool as far as Oakfield Siding near Cwmbran saw coal traffic until 1980.

The present station was opened by British Rail on 12 May 1986. It is situated around 300 yards (270 m) to the south of Lower Pontnewydd, which was closed to passengers on 9 June 1958 and to goods on 25 January 1965.

== Facilities ==
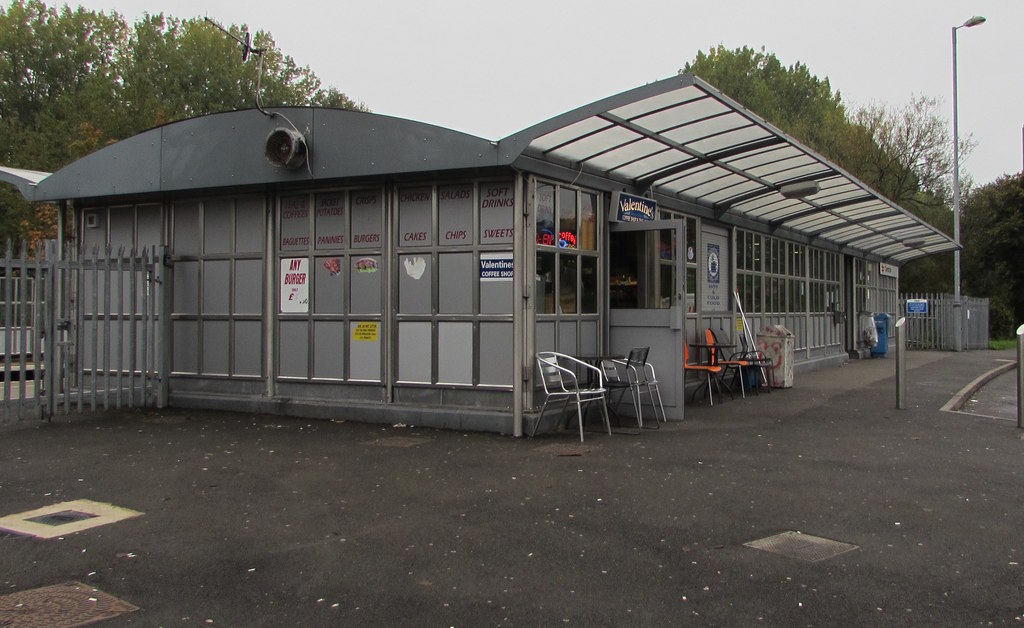
The new main building, consisting of a small café and ticket hall (2019)

Refurbished facilities at the station were opened officially by Rhodri Morgan AM on 14 March 2008. This included a larger car park, a new ticket hall, modern sheltered seating areas and new live departure boards. (Note: Similar to those seen at Newport High Street.) The booking office is open six days per week; there is also a self-service ticket machine on offer for use or to collect advance purchase tickets. Automatic announcements and timetable poster boards provide train running information in addition to the passenger information system displays mentioned. Level access is on offer to each side, though for the southbound platform, this requires a long detour via public roads as the footbridge linking the platforms is stepped.

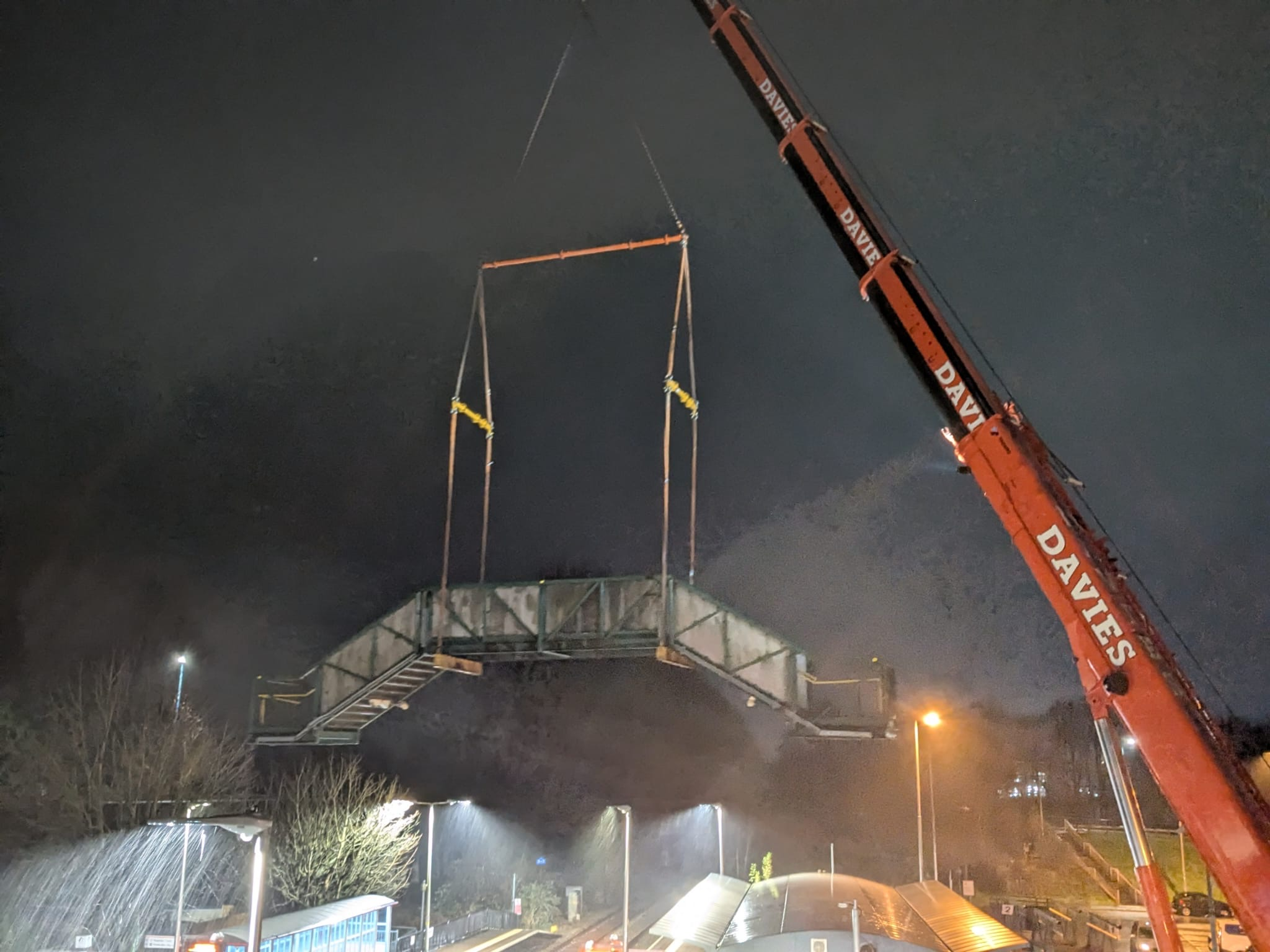
The old station footbridge being removed (2024)

An accessible footbridge with lifts was installed in Summer 2024, as part of and with funding from the Department for Transport's Access for All programme. On 1 December 2024, the old footbridge was removed and the new fully accessible footbridge was opened.

== Service ==
Transport for Wales operates the following general off-peak service pattern, in trains per hour (tph):

- 1 tph to Manchester Piccadilly
- 3 tp2h to Cardiff Central; of which:
  - 1 tp2h continues to Fishguard Harbour, Pembroke Dock or Milford Haven, via Carmarthen
- 1 tp2h to Holyhead.

Preceding station	National Rail	Following station
Abergavenny	Transport for Wales; Welsh Marches Line	Newport
Pontypool and New Inn	Transport for Wales; Welsh Marches Line	Newport
