= Old Cwmbran =

Area of Cwmbran, Torfaen, Wales

Coordinates: 51.6465°N 3.0255°W

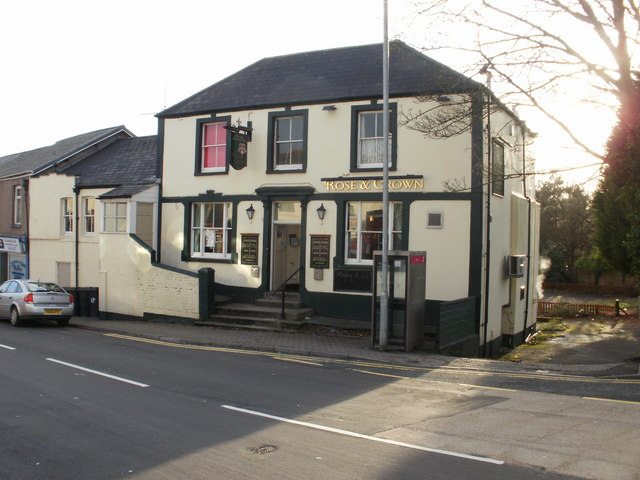
Rose & Crown, Old Cwmbran

Old Cwmbran (officially Old Cwmbrân, Welsh: Hen Gwmbrân; also known as Cwmbran Village) is an area of Cwmbran, Torfaen in Wales, within the historic boundaries of Monmouthshire.

== Original village ==
Old Cwmbran was the village which gave the 1950s New Town of Cwmbran its name, the New Town being an amalgamation of the villages of Pontnewydd, Llanyrafon, Croesyceiliog and (Old) Cwmbran.

== Village amenities ==
Despite being part of the much larger Cwmbran conurbation, Old Cwmbran retains many of the amenities of an independent village. The main high street has numerous shops and public houses. The area boasts a large Anglican church and a Roman Catholic church as well as a health centre and small supermarket known as WHAT! Old Cwmbran has become the home of Torfaen's first licensed sexshop.

Geographically, Old Cwmbran all but merged with adjacent Southville, Llantarnam and Cwmbran Centre. The shopping centre five minutes walk from the central village area.
