= Merthyr Tydfil bus station =

Bus station in Merthyr Tydfil, Wales

Merthyr Tydfil new bus station Gorsaf Fysiau Merthyr Tudful
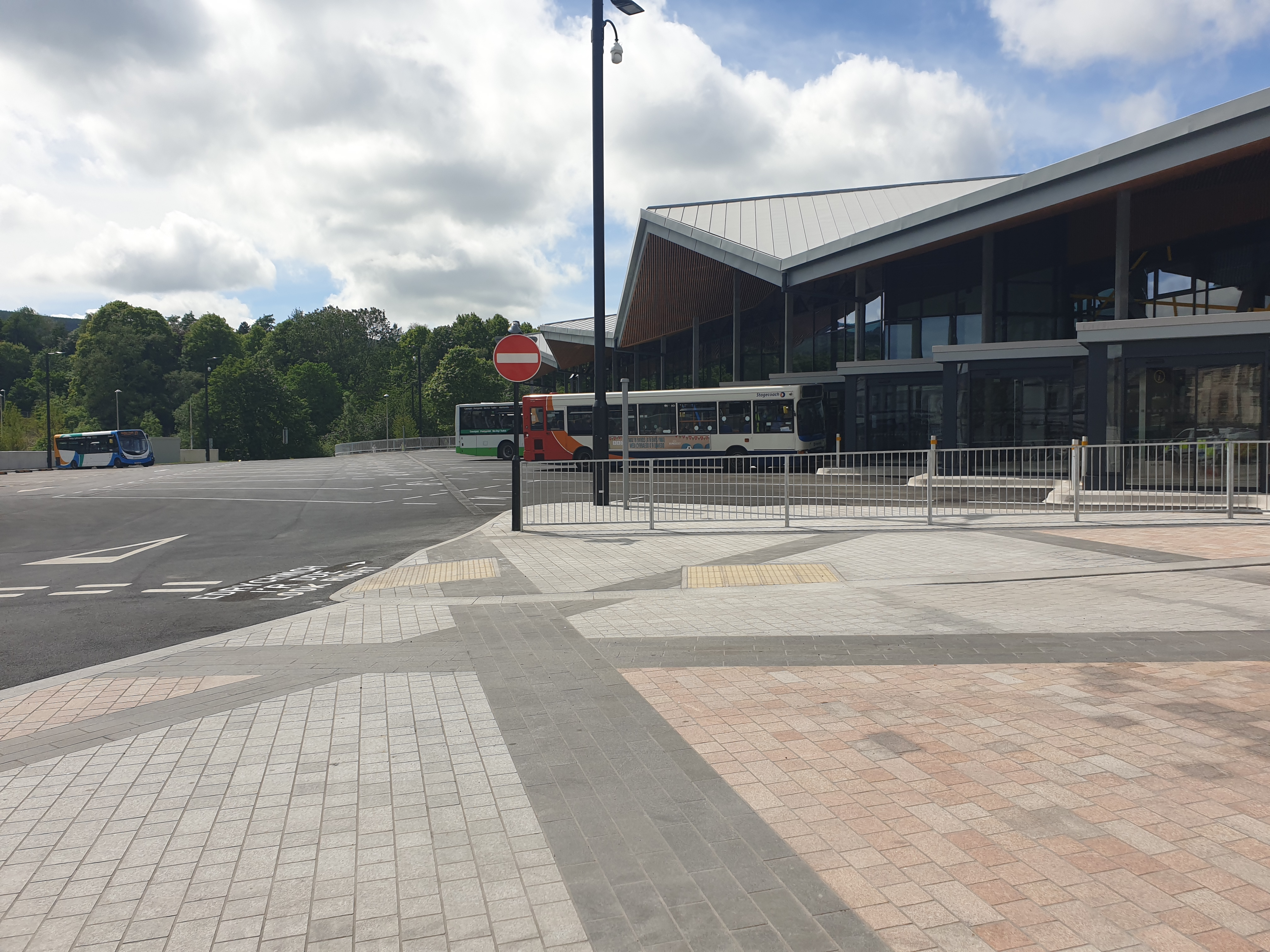
- Merthyr Tydfil Bus Station in June 2021

General information
- Location: Merthyr Tydfil Bus Station, Swan Street, Merthyr Tydfil, CF47 8EU
- Coordinates: 51.744°N 3.38°W
- System: Bus station
- Owner: Merthyr Tydfil County Borough Council
- Operator: Merthyr Tydfil County Borough Council
- Bus stands: 14
- Bus operators: Stagecoach South Wales
- Connections: Merthyr Tydfil railway station

Other information
- Website: https://traveline.info/

History
- Opened: June 13, 2021
Location

Merthyr Tydfil bus station is the bus station that serves the town of Merthyr Tydfil, South Wales.

There are 14 stands and the main operator at the station is Stagecoach South Wales. The former bus station closed and was demolished for development.

== History ==
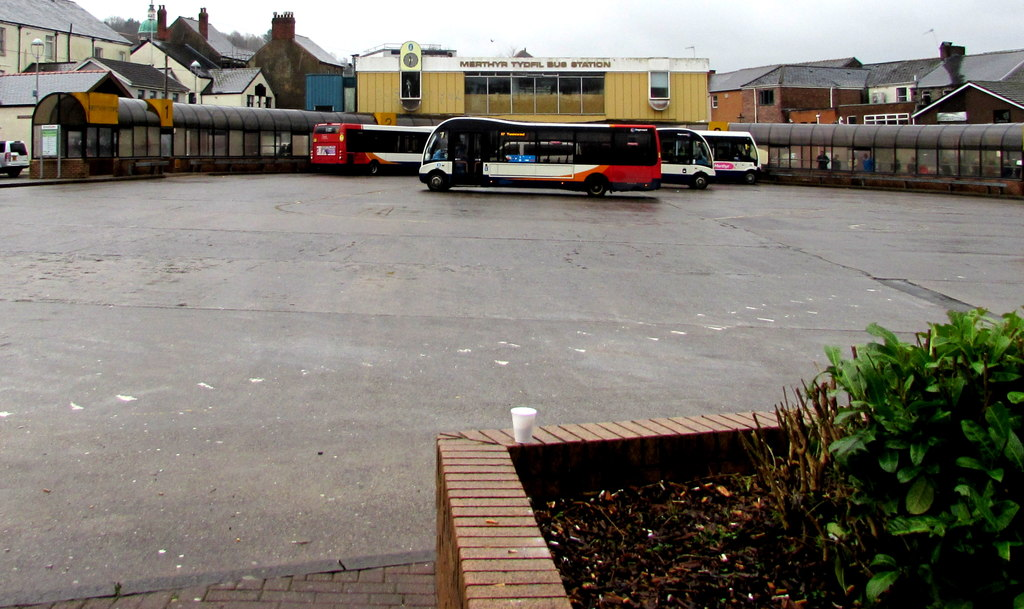
East side of original 1960s bus station (2019)

The original bus station dates from the 1960s, designed with two curving sections to give direct access to the adjacent modern shopping centre development. The former bus station closed on 11 June 2021 for demolition.

=== New station ===
In 2014 proposals were put forward for an alternative site to the south of the town centre at Swan Street, closer to the railway station. The town council described the design of the old site as problematic and "a location of high levels of anti-social behaviour and crime". In January 2015 the old police station and former Hollies health centre buildings at Swan Street was demolished and in August the plans for the new bus station on the site were released. Construction of the new bus station was dependent on funding from the Welsh Government. The Welsh Government has committed the funding, and the construction has started on 15 July 2019 and was finished within 91 weeks. The new Interchange opened on 13 June 2021. In June 2021, a time lapse video showing the completion of the works was released.

== Rail link ==
Merthyr Tydfil railway station is a four-minute walk from the bus station. From here, users can transfer to Transport for Wales services to Bridgend, Queen Street, Cardiff Central, and Barry, via the Merthyr line

== See also ==
- Transport in Wales
- List of bus stations in Wales
