= Cwmbran =

Town in Torfaen, Wales

Coordinates: 51.653°N 03.021°W

Cwmbrân
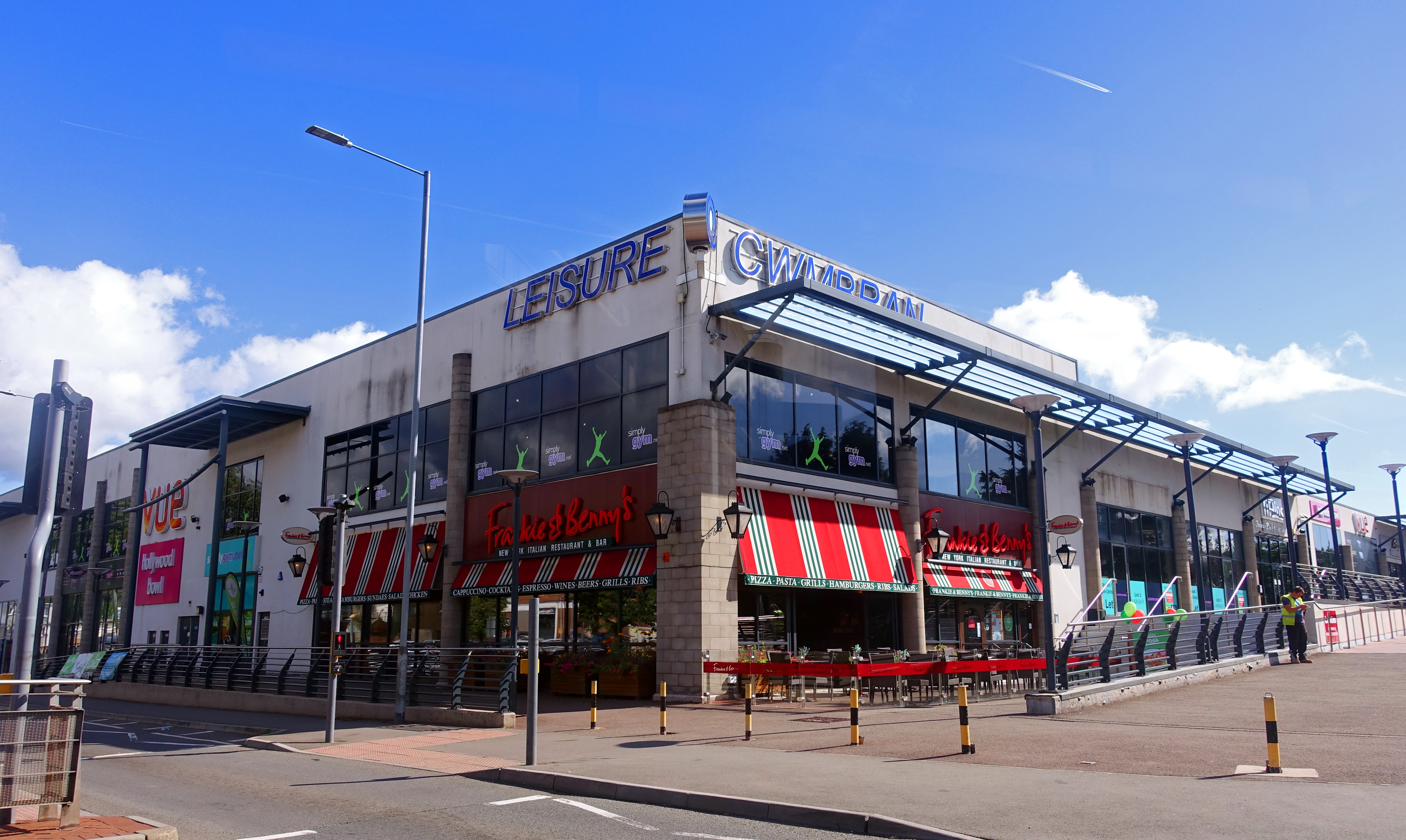
- Glyndŵr Road, 2018

- Location within Torfaen
- Population: 48,535
- OS grid reference: ST295955
- Community: Cwmbran
- Principal area: Torfaen
- Preserved county: Gwent
- Country: Wales
- Sovereign state: United Kingdom
- Post town: CWMBRAN
- Postcode district: NP44
- Dialling code: 01633
- Police: Gwent
- Fire: South Wales
- Ambulance: Welsh
- UK Parliament: Torfaen
- Senedd Cymru – Welsh Parliament: Sir Fynwy Torfaen

Cwmbran (/kʊmˈbrɑːn, kuːm-/ kuum-BRAHN, koom-), officially spelled using the Welsh spelling Cwmbrân ([kʊmˈbraːn]), is a town in the county borough of Torfaen, in the south of Wales. Lying within the historic boundaries of Monmouthshire, it was designated as a new town in 1949 to provide new employment opportunities in the south-eastern portion of the South Wales Coalfield.

== Toponymy ==
The name of the town in Welsh means "valley (cwm) of the crow (brân)". Cwmbran was the name of one of several villages located in the valley, which had grown up around the tinplate works of the Cwmbran Iron Company. The area of the old village became known as Old Cwmbran.

In October 2026, Torfaen County Borough Council and the Welsh Language Commissioner agreed on the official spelling of the place to be "Cwmbrân" in both Welsh and English.

== History ==
Cwmbran was founded in 1949 as a new town, to provide new employment opportunities in the south-eastern portion of the South Wales Coalfield, but the area has a long history.

There is evidence that Neolithic and Bronze Age people used the area, with the Iron Age Silures tribe also occupying the region before being subdued by the Roman legions, based at nearby Usk and Caerleon.

Around 1179, Hywel, Lord of Caerleon, gave a gift of money and land to found the Cistercian abbey at Llantarnam. At the dissolution of the monasteries by Henry VIII the abbey was closed and was bought by a succession of wealthy landowners. By the 18th century, the abbey had passed into the ownership of the Blewitt family, who were to become key figures in the early industrialisation of Cwmbran. Brick making, lime kilns, iron ore mining, quarrying and coal mining were established during this period, along with a canal to transport goods to the docks at Newport.

In 1833, the Ordnance Survey map of Monmouthshire shows Cwmbran as a farm situated in the area now known as Upper Cwmbran, in the valley named Cwm Brân. The town now covers an area of about 3,000 acres (1,214 ha) and has a population of around 50,000.

Following investigations by local residents Richard Davies and Mike Price, the Ancient Cwmbran & The Cistercian project was designed and created by Davies and Claire Dovey-Evans, a Torfaens heritage officer. A £48,000 grant was provided by the Heritage Lottery Fund and Torfaen County Borough Council to explore some previously unrecorded sites of interest in Fairwater, Greenmeadow and Thornhill areas of Cwmbran. In a national Heritage Lottery Fund publication, it was described as an "exemplified community project".

The Cistercian Way also passes through Llantarnam, Old Cwmbran, Greenmeadow and Thornhill before reaching the ancient chapel of Llanderfel on Mynydd Maen, and then onwards to Twmbarlwm.

In the 19th and 20th centuries, Cwmbran was the site of heavy industrial development. Coal and iron ore were extracted on Mynydd Maen, and were moved by inclined planes and tramways into the Eastern Valley for use in factories, such as the Patent Nut and Bolt Company, (Note: This became Guest Keen and Nettlefolds in 1900.) various tin plate works and brickworks. This industry drove the creation of the Monmouthshire Canal, the Newport and Pontypool Railway and the Pontypool, Caerleon and Newport Railway. Very little of this industrial heritage remains; many of today's light industrial or retail estates were created on the sites.

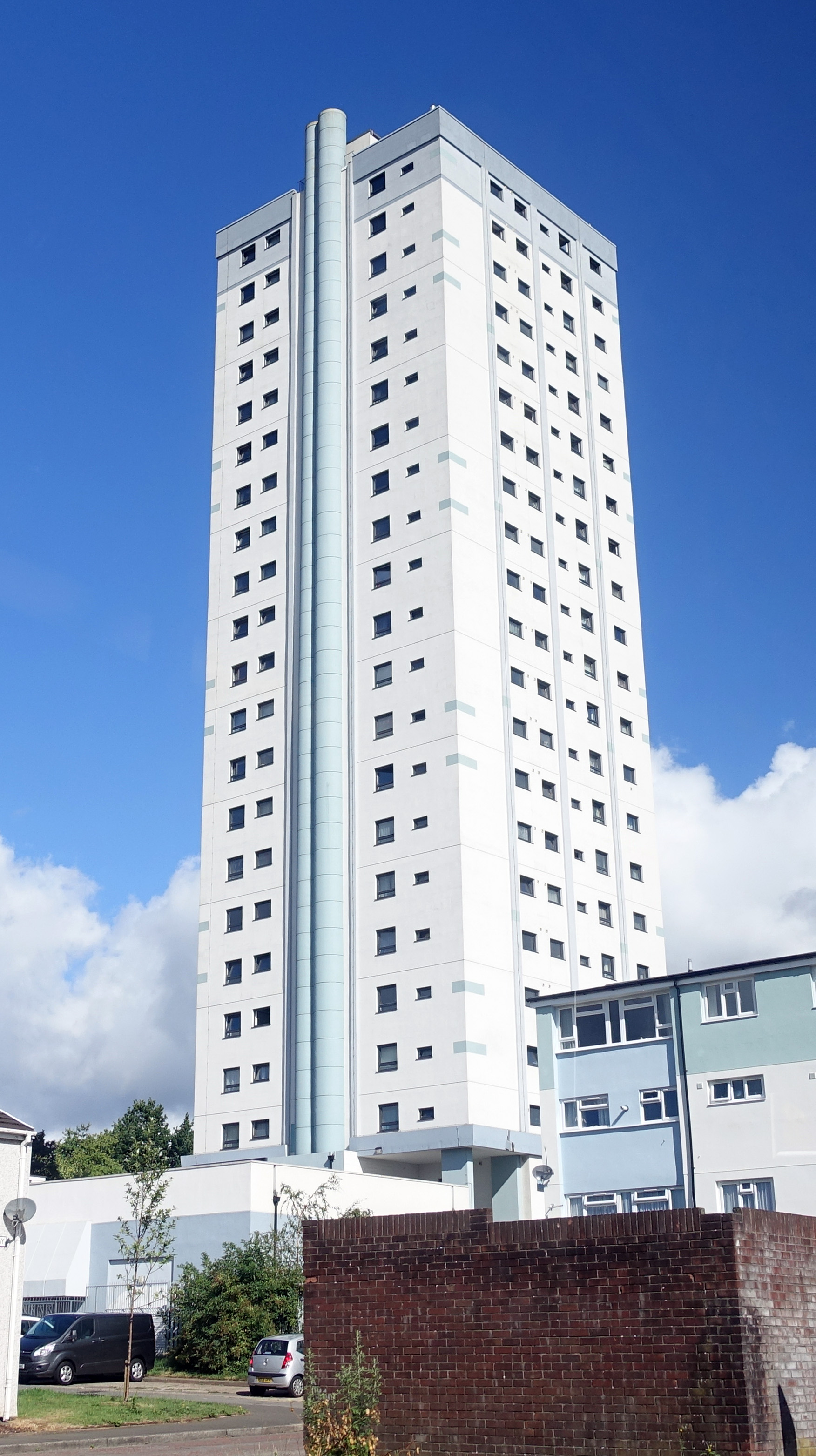
The Tower, a 23-storey housing block built in Cwmbran in the 1960s

Following the New Towns Act 1946, ministries and county councils were asked to nominate sites for housing. For Wales, the Ministry of Housing and Local Government proposed Church Village and Cwmbran. The former was vetoed by the Ministry of Power, as new housing there would have interfered with plans for the expansion of coal mining in the area; however, Cwmbran was passed in 1949.

Cwmbran was a civil parish and, from 1974, a community in its own right; it is one of only five in the new district of Torfaen. In 1985, the Cwmbran community was abolished; it was replaced by Cwmbran Central, Fairwater, Llantarnam, Pontnewydd and Upper Cwmbran.

== Geography ==
Comprising the villages of Old Cwmbran, Pontnewydd, Upper Cwmbran, Henllys, Croesyceiliog, Llantarnam and Llanyrafon, its population had grown to 48,535 by 2011. This makes it the sixth largest urban area in Wales.

Sited at the corner of the South Wales Coalfield, it has a hilly aspect to its western and northern edges, with the surrounding hills climbing to more than 1,000 feet (300 m). The Afon Llwyd forms the major river valley, although the most significant water course is probably the remains of the Monmouthshire & Brecon Canal. To the east of Cwmbran, the land is less hilly, forming part of the Usk Valley.

== Economy ==
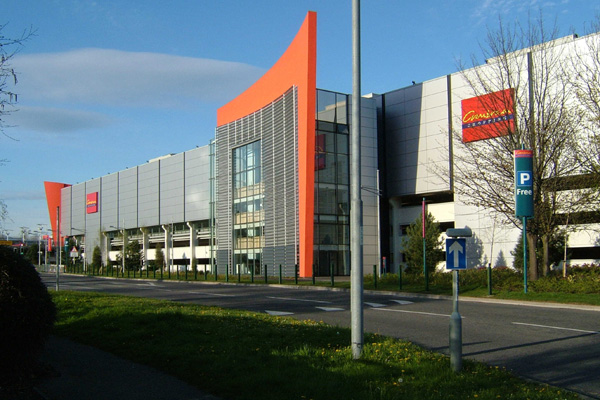
The Cwmbran Centre

The longest established employer in Cwmbran is Burton's Foods, which employs about 1,000 people to make its Jammie Dodgers and Wagon Wheels biscuits; as of 2005, the plant produces more than 400 million of the latter every year.

Safran Seats Great Britain (formerly Zodiac Aerospace) is the current owner of a factory in Cwmbran which employs around 1,000 people for manufacturing aircraft seats.

Constructed from 1959 to 1981, the pedestrianised Cwmbran Centre hosts supermarkets, high street retailers, banks, theatre, cinema, bowling alley, restaurants, creche, trampoline park, gym, police station, magistrates court, youth centre, pub, library, arts centre and office space. The 170+ shops can be accessed by the bus station, which is located in the centre, a railway station a few minutes' walk north-east or with the 3,000 free car parking spaces located around the ring road.

Small and medium enterprises include the Cwmbran Brewery in Upper Cwmbran, which opened in 1996 as Cottage Spring Brewery.

== Education ==
The town has two secondary schools: Croesyceiliog School and Cwmbran High School. There are numerous primary and nursery schools, including a Welsh medium primary school, Ysgol Gymraeg Cwmbrân. Crownbridge Special School is located in the town; the ages of its pupils range from two to 19 years.

Further education, vocational training and some higher education is provided at Torfaen Learning Zone, of Coleg Gwent in the Cwmbran Centre.

== Transport ==
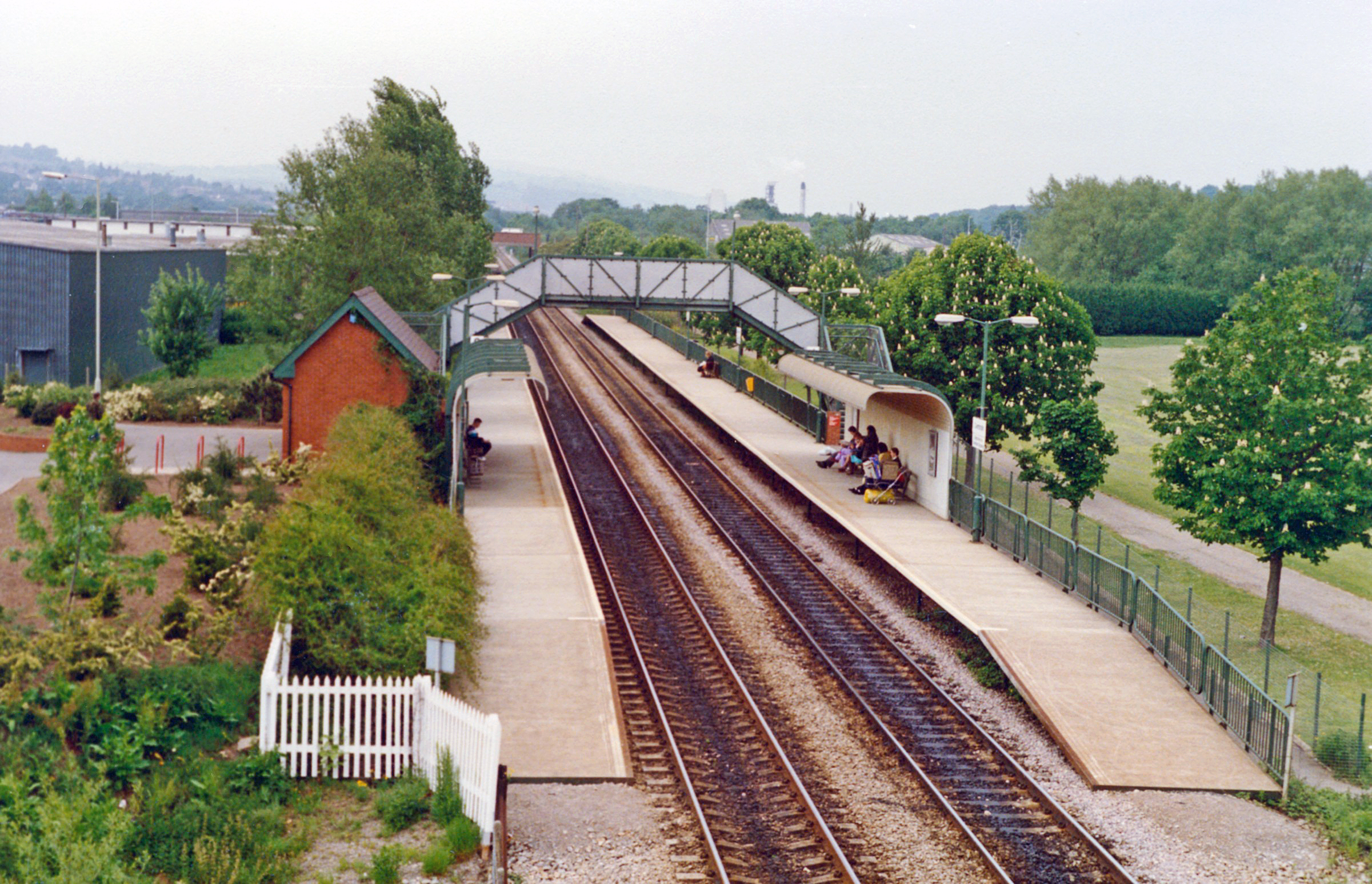
The town's railway station, which dates from 1986; its rebuilding was one of the last acts of the Cwmbran New Town Development Board

Cwmbran railway station is served by trains on the Welsh Marches Line:

- Southbound services connect the town with Newport, Cardiff Central and West Wales
- Northbound local trains serve Pontypool and New Inn and Abergavenny
- Northbound longer distance services run to Hereford, Shrewsbury, Wrexham General, Crewe, Chester, Holyhead and Manchester Piccadilly.

Historically, the town was served by two lines and several local stations. The first line was built by the Monmouthshire Railway and Canal Company and opened in 1852. Much of its route is now under Cwmbran Drive, the A4051. The line that is still in use was opened by the Pontypool, Caerleon and Newport Railway in 1874. Upon the last station's closure in 1965, the town was left without for 21 years.

Cwmbran bus station is the focal point of the town's bus services, which are operated primarily by Newport Bus and Stagecoach South Wales; key routes include:

- X3 between Cardiff and Pontypool
- 23 between Newport, Blaenavon, Abergavenny, Pontypool, Blackwood, Varteg and Hereford
- 29/A to Newport, via Caerleon, Ponthir, Llanfrecha and the Grange University Hospital.

== Amenities ==
- Boating Lake Park
- Congress Theatre
- Five Locks, along the Monmouthshire and Brecon Canal
- Greenmeadow Community Farm
- Henllys local nature reserve
- Llantarnam Grange Arts Centre.

== Media ==
The main newspaper in the region is the South Wales Argus and the semi-national Western Mail; the digital edition of the latter is published as Wales Online. The town is served by Cwmbran Life, while the BBC provides the South East Wales region's news from their base in Cardiff.

A number of on-line and amateur radio stations operate in Cwmbran. Vitalize Radio operates as the community radio station for Torfaen, originally established in 2014 as Torfonix. There are also the Cwmbran & District Amateur Radio Society and Able Radio, which support adults with autism and learning disabilities.

== Sport ==
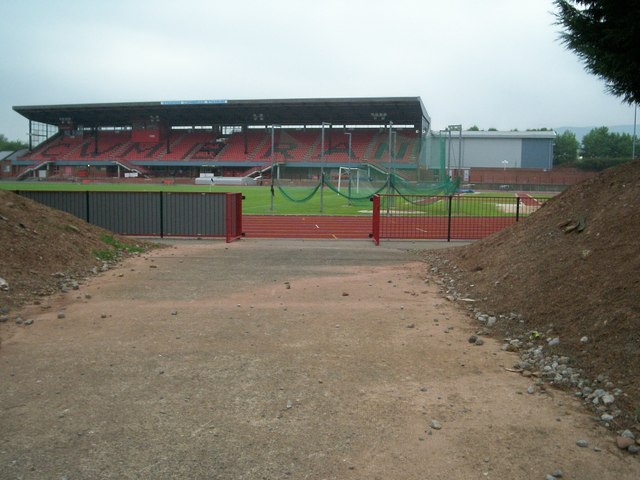
Cwmbran Stadium

Cwmbran Stadium is a multi-purpose stadium with an athletics track, an eight-court sports hall, fitness suite, swimming pool and an indoor bowling rink; the grassed pitch is used by Cwmbran Town FC and Gwent Hockey Club.

=== Athletics ===
Cwmbran Stadium was home to international athletics events in the 1970s and 1980s. British athletics coach Malcolm Arnold used to train some of his athletes at Cwmbran in the 1980s and early 1990s when he was the Welsh national coach. Athletes who trained there regularly under Arnold included former world 110m hurdle champion and world record holder, Colin Jackson; Commonwealth 110m hurdle medallist, Paul Gray; and Nigel Walker. (Note: Walker had two sporting careers: first as an Olympic hurdler and then later as a Welsh rugby union international player.) The 1999 world indoor 400m champion Jamie Baulch also used the stadium as a regular training track, but under a different coach.

The town has three athletics clubs: Cwmbran Harriers, Fairwater Runners and Griffithstown Harriers.

=== Football ===
The three main football teams in Cwmbran are Cwmbran Town, Cwmbran Celtic and Croesyceilog, which all compete in the Football Association of Wales' leagues. Cwmbran Celtic's ground lies adjacent at the Motazone Arena.

The Football Factory was an indoor sports complex, consisting of two pitches; the building was destroyed by fire in February 2017.

For the 2026–27 season, Cwmbran Celtic has replaced conventional shirt sponsorship with four independent music acts, with Super Furry Animals and Panic Shack appearing on the men's and women's home shirts, and Mogwai and Loose Articles on the away shirts. The kits, supplied by Tor Sports, were launched in August 2026 and the club donates 10% of the profit from each shirt sold to the Music Venue Trust, a charity supporting grass roots music venues.

=== Rugby union ===
Grounds at Pontnewydd, Croesyceiliog and Glan-Yr-Afon Leisure Centre house the town's three rugby union teams: Cwmbran RFC, Croesyceiliog RFC and Girling RFC respectively. However, many more of the town's residents support the rugby teams of the older adjacent town of Pontypool, the city of Newport and the Newport Gwent Dragons regional team.

=== Rugby league ===
Rugby league is represented in the town by Torfaen Tigers, which plays in the fourth tier of the pyramid system, the Conference League South at the Kings Head Ground, home of Cwmbran RFC.

== In popular culture ==
In July 2011, Cwmbran was the setting for Goldie Lookin Chain's satirical "Fresh Prince of Cwmbran", a song based on the Fresh Prince of Bel-Air theme praising the town.

== Notable people ==
See also Category:People from Cwmbran

- Jamie Arthur (born 1979) – Commonwealth Games medal-winning boxer
- Ivor Bulmer-Thomas (1905-1993) – former Member of Parliament (MP) and church preservation campaigner
- Ceri Dallimore (born 1974) – Commonwealth Games gold medal-winning markswoman
- Andy Dibble (born 1965) – professional footballer (goalkeeper)
- Christian Doidge (born 1992) – professional footballer for Hibernian F.C.
- Connor Edwards (born 1997) – professional rugby player for Doncaster R.F.C. and Newport Gwent Dragons
- Danny Gabbidon (born 1979) – professional footballer for Cardiff City and Wales national football team
- Green Gartside (born 1955) – singer with 1980s pop band Scritti Politti
- Ian Gough (born 1976) – Newport Gwent Dragons, Ospreys and 64 caps for the Wales rugby union team
- Jak Jones (born 1993) – professional snooker player
- Nick Kenny (born 1993) – darts player and Welsh international
- Denise Kingsmill, Baroness Kingsmill (born 1947) – Labour life peer; personal injury, trade union and employment law solicitor; and business adviser
- Gary Lockett (born 1976) – world title challenging boxer; and TV and radio analyst
- Cory McKenna (born 1999) – professional mixed martial artist
- Margaret Price (1941-2011) – opera singer
- Dave Richards (born 1993) – professional footballer for Crewe Alexandra
- Theo Wharton (born 1994) – Cardiff City Academy graduate and Wales youth international
- John Williams (1857-1932) – real name John Fielding; Zulu War, and Rorke's Drift veteran and Victoria Cross recipient. He was born in Abergavenny and is buried in Llantarnam
- Sioned Williams (born 1971) – Plaid Cymru member of the Senedd for South Wales West.
- Jacob Draper (born 1998) - Hockey player for Pinoke HC, Welsh national team, GB Hockey and 2x Olympian

== Twin town ==
- Bruchsal in Baden-Württemberg, Germany
