= Pontypool, Caerleon and Newport Railway =

UK railway line

The Pontypool, Caerleon and Newport Railway (PC&NR) was promoted independently to relieve congestion on the heavily worked Eastern Valley Line of the Monmouthshire Railway and Canal Company. The Great Western Railway (GWR) put up half the capital, making it in effect a GWR subsidiary. It opened in 1874, and most long-distance passenger and goods traffic, especially the heavy mineral traffic, transferred to it. It amalgamated with the GWR in 1876.

The Llantarnam Link, connecting the upper Eastern Valley network, was opened in 1878 and from that time most local traffic transferred to the line.

The main line was increasingly used for long-distance passenger and goods traffic, especially from Bristol and the West of England after the opening of the Severn Tunnel. As local traffics declined and were extinguished, the PC&NR main line remained a key part of the North and West Route from the Severn to Shrewsbury and from there to the Mersey, and North Wales, and carries that traffic at the present day.

== The Eastern Valley Line of the Monmouthshire Railway and Canal Company ==
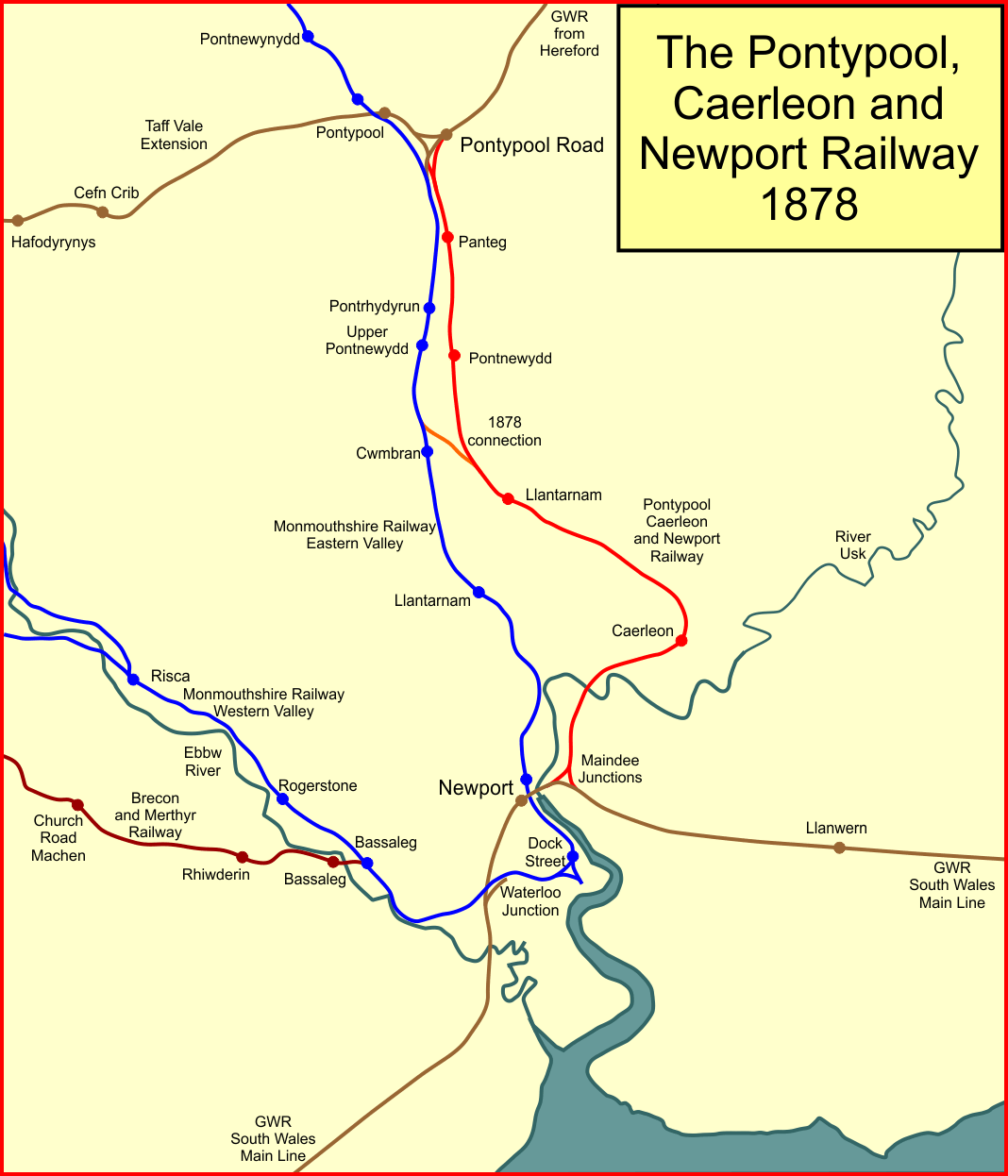
The Pontypool, Caerleon and Newport Railway in 1878

In 1845 the Monmouthshire Railway and Canal Company (MR&CC) was authorised by the Newport and Pontypool Railway Act 1845 (8 & 9 Vict. c. clxix) to build a line from Newport to Pontnewynydd, a short distance north-west of Pontypool, connecting industrial areas there. There were already mineral tramways beyond Pontnewynydd, but they brought mineral products to the canal, where they had to be transshipped for onward conveyance to Newport.

The "Newport and Ponty-pool Railway", as it was called at first, was to be a standard gauge railway by-passing the canal and avoiding the delay and cost of the transshipment. The line was soon known as the Eastern Valley Line of the Monmouthshire Railway and Canal Company. The South Wales Main Line of the Great Western Railway was broad gauge at the time, and no connection between the two railways at Newport was contemplated.

At the same time the Newport, Abergavenny and Hereford Railway (NA&HR) had a bill in Parliament for its line; it was promoted independently and was to be standard gauge. In this period Parliament was concerned to restrict what it saw as unnecessary parallel routes, and in authorising the NA&HR line in 1846, it refused it permission to build south of Pontypool. The NA&HR had to make a junction with the Monmouthshire Railway and Canal Company, and use its line from Pontypool to Newport. It also had to use the MR&CC passenger station there, although mineral traffic to the docks was considerably dominant, and a northward flow, of coal to the River Mersey for bunkering ships, developed strongly.

There was a national financial crisis at the time of authorisation of these lines, and it proved impossible for some time to raise the capital for construction, which was much delayed. The Eastern Valley Line was eventually opened on 30 June 1852. The Newport, Abergavenny and Hereford Railway was opened to goods trains on 30 July 1852, and full public opening to passengers took place on 2 January 1854. (Note: It was delayed due to a landslip.)

The iron and coal production in the lines served by the Monmouthshire line developed very considerably over the succeeding years, and although the company doubled the track, there was severe congestion, and the NA&HR trains were adversely affected.

The NA&HR built its Taff Vale Extension Line from Pontypool to Quakers Yard, opening progressively from 1855 to 1858. This east–west route intersected numerous valleys and as their own railway systems developed, many mineral sites used the Taff Vale Extension to pass their production towards London and the north-west of England. The NA&HR was merged with other companies to form the West Midland Railway in 1860, and that company in turn amalgamated with the Great Western Railway in 1863. Coal production at Aberdare was exceptionally buoyant, and much of the product was sent to London. (Note: Over "narrow" (standard) gauge routes via Hereford.)

Traffic from the collieries and ironworks in the area of the Upper Eastern Valley was brought into Newport docks over the Eastern Valley Main Line. If it was to continue from Newport by rail, the load was transshipped at sidings at Waterloo Junction, near Ebbw Junction, within the Newport sidings complex; the GWR was still a broad gauge railway at this time. The traffic could then continue towards Gloucester on the GWR main line. (Note: The Severn Tunnel was not opened until 1886.) Newport GWR station itself was extremely congested at the time, and the transit over the Eastern Valley Line was in itself difficult.

== The Caerleon line proposed ==
Pontypool, Caerleon and Newport Railway Act 1865
- Act of Parliament
- Parliament of the United Kingdom
- Long title: An Act for making Railways from the Newport, Abergavenny, and Hereford Line of the Great Western Railway Company at Pontypool to Caerleon, and to the Great Western Railway at or near Newport; and for other Purposes.
- Citation: 28 & 29 Vict. c. ccclxiv

Dates
- Royal assent: 5 July 1865

The Pontypool, Caerleon and Newport Railway (PC&NR) (Note: There was another PC&NR nearby: the Pontypridd, Caerphilly and Newport Railway.) was promoted in the 1865 session of Parliament to build a new route to avoid the lower part of the Eastern Valley Line: it was an independent company. It was authorised by the Pontypool, Caerleon and Newport Railway Act 1865 (28 & 29 Vict. c. ccclxiv) to build a standard gauge railway totalling, with branches, twelve miles in extent, from a triangular junction at Pontypool to a triangular junction at Maindee, immediately east of Newport station. At Pontypool this gave access from Hereford over the NA&HR main line, and from their Taff Vale Extension Line. It appears (Note: From the statutory newspaper announcement referenced.) that the Blaenavon and Abersychan districts on the upper part of the Monmouthshire Railway were not to be connected at Pontypool, but by a connection to the Eastern Valley Main Line further south, near the 3 milepost from Newport, at a point where the River Usk makes a northward sweep near Malpas. Making the connection here would give access from the industrial sites intermediately on the Eastern Valley. (This connection was not actually made.)

At Maindee, the westward arm of the triangular junction, coupled with the proposed mixed gauge track, would give access to Newport High Street station of the GWR, and to Waterloo Junction, where transhipment from narrow (standard) gauge wagons to broad gauge already took place; and also to the docks area in general. The eastern arm of the triangle to the future Maindee East Junction led nowhere, as there were no siding or other facilities to handle arriving narrow gauge trains.

Powers were taken for the Great Western Railway, the Midland Railway and the London & North Western Railway (LNWR) or any of them, to use or work the line or to subscribe for shares in the company. Most importantly powers were taken for the laying of mixed gauge track on the GWR main line between Maindee West Junction and Waterloo Junction, and the use of Newport High Street GWR station.

The proposal was speculative; the junctions with the broad gauge GWR would still require transshipping of goods and minerals for onward transit, and the eastward spur at Maindee did not lead to sidings where that might be done. Nevertheless, the possibility of the LNWR, who were running passenger trains to Newport over the Monmouthshire line, getting a firmer foothold at Newport was unattractive to the GWR, and it encouraged the new company. At the same time the Monmouthshire Railway and Canal Company was extremely hostile, as the new line would abstract much of their Eastern Valley business.

== Authorisation ==
The Pontypool, Caerleon and Newport Railway was incorporated by the Pontypool, Caerleon and Newport Railway Act 1865 (28 & 29 Vict. c. ccclxiv) on 5 July 1865. Authorised capital was £100,000, of which the Great Western Railway subscribed £50,000. However, by this time it was plain that commercial pressure would oblige the GWR to convert the broad gauge track on the South Wales Main Line to narrow (standard) gauge in the foreseeable future. Moreover, as the GWR had secured an alliance with the Caerleon line—subscribing half the capital put the GWR in charge—the LNWR was for the time being excluded. Consequently, in the meantime the GWR and the PC&NR did not hasten to construct the line. The alliance was strengthened in 1871 by an understanding between the two companies, under which the board of the Pontypool, Caerleon and Newport Railway Company were entirely GWR nominees.

The alignment of the PC&NR to the GWR increased the hostility of the Monmouthshire Railway and Canal Company to the project, and this may explain the omission of the proposed connection near Caerleon.

== Opening ==
With the gauge conversion of the GWR lines in South Wales completed in 1872, the construction of the Caerleon line was put in hand, and it was opened to goods traffic on 17 September 1874, and to passenger trains on 21 December 1874. The London and North Western Railway was running passenger trains from Shrewsbury to Newport at the time, and these were transferred to Newport High Street station over the new line, enabling direct change of train for passengers there, from 1 January 1875. (Note: Barrie page 65; he says "From 1 January 1875 a LNWR through Shrewsbury – Mill Street passenger service operated." He must mean High Street, not Mill Street.)

The inauguration of the new line enabled the Great Western Railway to divert to the route all of its traffic from the Eastern Valley Line; this included its heavy flow of coal from Aberdare over the Taff Vale Extension Line and over the PC&NR line, turning east at Maindee to London and Southampton (via Basingstoke). Moreover, the inconvenience of transshipping local narrow gauge traffic at Waterloo Junction and continuing through Newport was eliminated.

== Impact on the Monmouthshire Railway and Canal Company ==
The opening of the line had a considerable effect on the Monmouthshire Eastern Valley Line, as much business was diverted away from their line.

The success of the transfer of traffic encouraged the GWR to propose a line connecting Sirhowy and Caerleon. The Taff Vale Extension Line was steeply graded and not without difficulty in operation, whereas the Sirhowy route would have easier gradients for the loaded mineral trains from Aberdare and elsewhere. It would avoid the use of the upper parts of the Monmouthshire Railway's Eastern Valley altogether; at the time the Monmouthshire company was suffering from a competitive disadvantage due to failure to modernise, and this new move threatened the further loss of a very considerable part of that company's business. At first the Monmouthshire opposed the GWR plans in the House of Commons, but the bill passed nonetheless, becoming the Newport, Abergavenny and Hereford Railway (Taff Vale Extension) Act 1853 (16 & 17 Vict. c. clxxviii). Seeing the situation clearly now, the Monmouthshire negotiated a 99-year lease (Note: Technically an unlimited grant of running powers.) of its 51-mile network to the GWR, which was effective from 1 August 1875. As well as the railways, the canal network also passed to the GWR: both arms of the original Monmouthshire Canal, except for the northern two miles above Pontymoile, which had been converted to a railway in 1854, and the Brecon and Abergavenny Canal.

The PC&NR was amalgamated with the GWR on 13 July 1876.

== Llantarnam link ==
The PC&NR line gave access to Newport and to the South Wales Main Line eastwards at Maindee, but at its northern end it was connected to Pontypool Road. Traffic from the Taff Vale Extension Line and from the Hereford direction could run directly to it, but local traffic from the upper sections of the Eastern Valley Line could only reach it by reversing at the Coedygric sidings complex near Pontypool Road. Now that those lines were all in GWR hands, the time had come to connect them. A connecting line further south, joining the Eastern Valley Line with the PC&NR line near Cwmbran; it was 67 chains in length from Cwmbran Junction to Llantarnam Junction, and it opened in April 1878. From the following year all through traffic and local passenger trains were diverted away from the lower Eastern Valley Line.

== Growth ==
The availability of the Maindee East Loop coupled with the opening of the Severn Tunnel in 1886 vastly simplified the transfer of coal traffic to London and also to Portland and Southampton, where bunkering Royal Navy and ocean-going commercial shipping was experiencing considerable growth. As far as passenger services were concerned, as well as trains from Cardiff and Newport to the Hereford and Shrewsbury line, a developing traffic ran from Bristol and the West of England after the opening of the Severn Tunnel in 1886 northwards from Maindee East Junction through Hereford. This enabled trains to reach the River Mersey (at Birkenhead) over track controlled solely or jointly by the GWR, whereas routing via Gloucester and Birmingham was dependent on the co-operation of competing companies. The route was marketed as "The North and West Route", and use of the route for through goods and passenger trains became very heavy.

== Decline of coal, and of local passenger traffic ==
Following 1945 coal business declined, gradually at first. The marginal pits in the Eastern Valley were hit, and the Eastern Valley line from Cwmbran Junction to Newport closed from 27 October 1963, all residual traffic being routed over the PC&NR line. Local passenger traffic declined too, and many wayside stations had closed from 30 April 1962, and this left no passenger station open on the former PC&NR. Only a basic Cardiff – Hereford – Shrewsbury service remained, although through freight business was reasonably buoyant.

The Llantarnam Junction to Cwmbran Junction link line closed when the upper part of the Eastern Valley route closed in 1980; it had probably been dormant since the closure of the last mineral working to Hafodyrynys over the Taff Vale Extension line on 31 March 1979.

== Location list ==
=== PC&NR main line ===
- Pontypool Road; originally opened in 1854 for the Newport, Abergavenny and Hereford Railway; now named Pontypool and New Inn;
- Panteg; opened 21 December 1874; closed 1 August 1880;
- Panteg Junction; convergence of line from Pontnewynydd;
- Pontnewydd; opened 21 December 1874; closed 1 January 1917; reopened 5 May 1919; renamed Lower Pontnewydd 1925; closed 9 June 1958;
- Cwmbran; new station opened 12 May 1986; still open;
- Llantarnam Junction; convergence of connection from Cwmbran Junction;
- Llantarnam; opened by August 1878; closed 30 April 1962;
- Ponthir; opened 1 June 1878; closed 30 April 1962;
- Caerleon; opened 21 December 1874; closed 30 April 1962;
- Maindee North Junction; line forks to
  - Maindee West Junction towards Newport Station; and
  - Maindee East Junction towards Severn Tunnel Junction.

=== Llantarnam Link ===
- Cwmbran Junction; divergence from Eastern Valley line;
- Cwmbran; opened 1 August 1880; closed 30 April 1962;
- Llantarnam Junction; convergence with PC&NR main line (above).
