= List of public art in Torfaen =

Map of Wales with Torfaen County Borough highlighted

This is a list of public art in Torfaen in south-east Wales. Torfaen lies within the historic boundaries of Monmouthshire. It was formed in 1974 as a district of the county of Gwent and in 1996 it was reconstituted as a principal area and county borough. This list applies only to works of public art on permanent display in an outdoor public space and does not, for example, include artworks in museums.

== Blaenavon ==
Image	Title / subject	Location and coordinates	Date	Artist / designer	Type	Material	Dimensions	Designation	Wikidata	Notes
More images	War memorial	Opposite Workmen's Hall, Blaenavon	1931	RL Edmunds	Clock tower					

== Cwmbran ==
Image	Title / subject	Location and coordinates	Date	Artist / designer	Type	Material	Dimensions	Designation	Wikidata	Notes
	War memorial	Cwmbran Park near Henllys Way, Cwmbran	Restored 1999		Cross on pedestal with plaques	Granite				Cross restored & plaques repositioned in 1999.
	Otter Sculpture	Cwmbran Shopping Centre			Sculpture	Metal				

== Griffithstown ==
Image	Title / subject	Location and coordinates	Date	Artist / designer	Type	Material	Dimensions	Designation	Wikidata	Notes
	War memorial	Village Square, Griffithstown			Obelisk					

== Old Cwmbran ==
Image	Title / subject	Location and coordinates	Date	Artist / designer	Type	Material	Dimensions	Designation	Wikidata	Notes
	War memorial	Junction of Ventnor Rd. & Victoria St., Old Cwmbran	1936		Clock tower	Wrought iron				

== Panteg ==
Image	Title / subject	Location and coordinates	Date	Artist / designer	Type	Material	Dimensions	Designation	Wikidata	Notes
More images	War memorial	Panteg cemetery, Panteg	1924		Cross on a stepped base	Stone				

== Pontnewydd ==
Image	Title / subject	Location and coordinates	Date	Artist / designer	Type	Material	Dimensions	Designation	Wikidata	Notes
	War memorial	Junction of Lowlands Rd. & Clark Avenue, Pontnewydd			Obelisk	Marble	7m tall			

== Pontypool ==
Image	Title / subject	Location and coordinates	Date	Artist / designer	Type	Material	Dimensions	Designation	Wikidata	Notes
	Gorsedd stones	Pontypool Park, Pontypool	1923		Stone circle	Stone				Erected to mark the 1924 National Eisteddfod of Wales
	War memorial	Pontypool Park, Hanbury Road entrance	1924		Plaques on gate pillars	Metal & bronze				
