= New Inn =

New Inn: Welsh: Y Dafarn Newydd
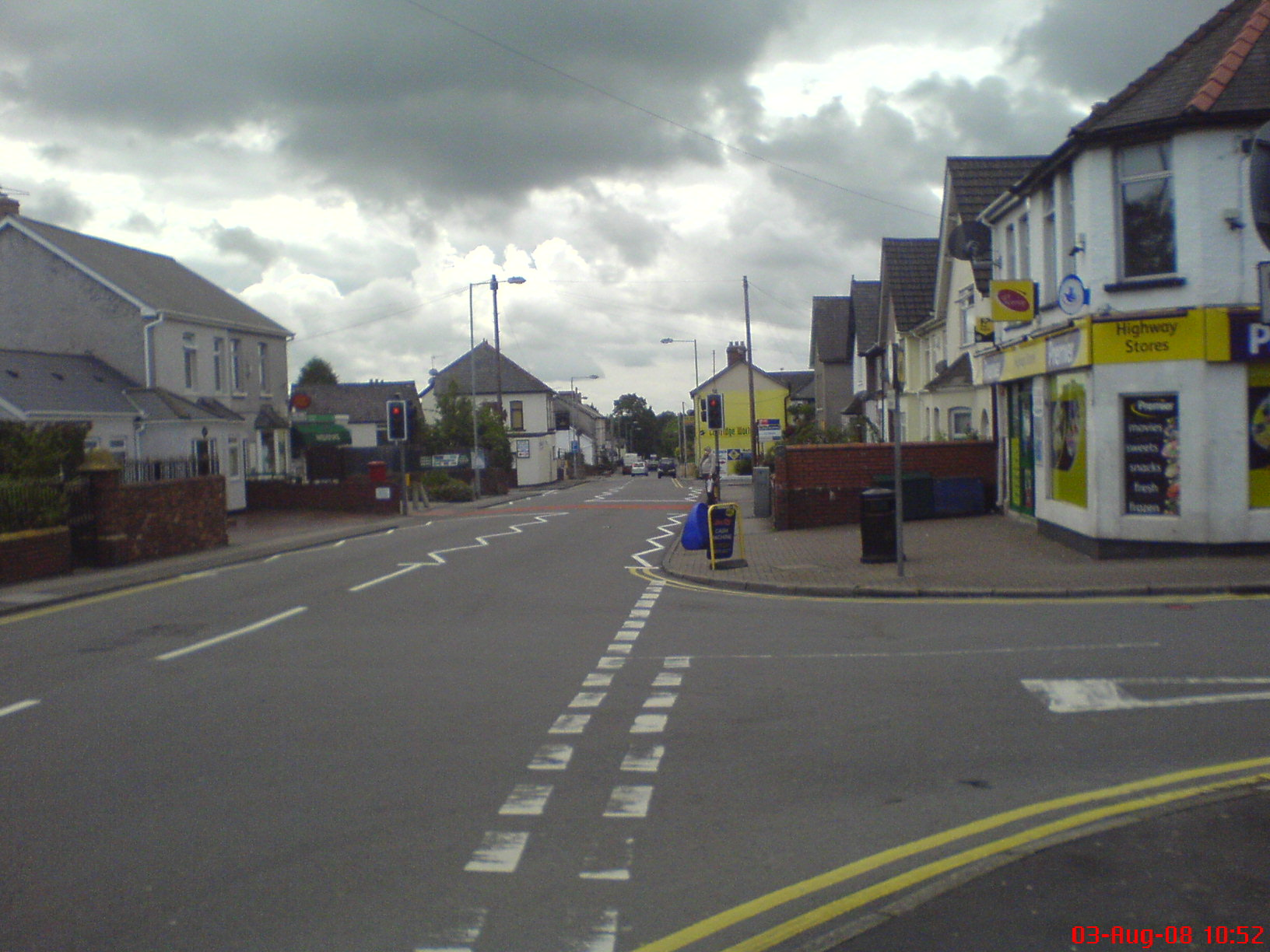
- The Highway and junction with New Road. Looking south towards Berry's Corner

- Location within Torfaen
- Area: 11.44 km^{2} (4.42 sq mi)
- Population: 5,986 (2011)
  - Density: 523/km^{2} (1,350/sq mi)
- OS grid reference: ST 300 999
- Community: New Inn
- Principal area: Torfaen
- Preserved county: Gwent
- Country: Wales
- Sovereign state: United Kingdom
- Post town: PONTYPOOL
- Postcode district: NP4
- Dialling code: 01495
- Police: Gwent
- Fire: South Wales
- Ambulance: Welsh
- UK Parliament: Torfaen
- Senedd Cymru – Welsh Parliament: Torfaen
- List of places UK Wales Torfaen 51.691°N 3.009°W Map of the community

New Inn (Welsh: Y Dafarn Newydd) is a village and community directly south east of Pontypool, within the County Borough of Torfaen in Wales, within the historic boundaries of Monmouthshire. It had a population of 5,986 at the 2011 Census.

== Location ==
The village is bounded to the north by the Monmouthshire & Brecon Canal; on the east by the Torfaen and Monmouthshire administrative border; the western boundary follows the Afon Lwyd river between Pontypool Park Gates and Chapel Lane in Pontrhydyrun. The southern boundary is difficult to accurately determine but probably extends no further than the Pimlico Garage on the old Cwmbran Road.

== History ==
The modern-day village grew from a small number of houses built during the very late nineteenth century and into the twentieth century along The Highway (the main road through the village, spelt The High Way on earlier maps), which was then the main route between Newport (to the south) and Pontypool.

An 1886 map (from a survey conducted in 1881) details the village as "New-inn" with a small number of buildings clustered around the current centre of the village. At this time there were no houses along the Highway to the railway station. An independent Welsh chapel is recorded (the modern-day Congregational Church). The development of Panteg steelworks and a large marshalling yard and building of Pontypool Road Station further allowed the village to expand.

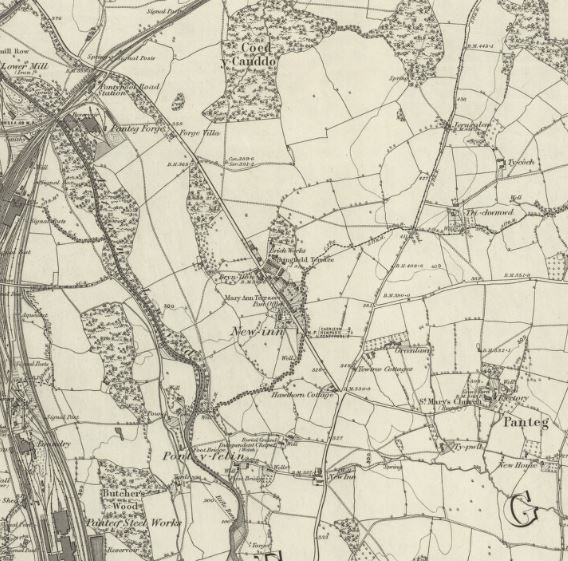
Section from 1886 Ordnance Survey Map showing village of New Inn and surroundings

By 1902 an Ordnance Survey county edition series map shows the village split into three distinct areas - Upper, Middle and Lower New Inn. Upper New Inn corresponds to the centre of the village as it is today; Middle New Inn is centred on Berry's Corner and Lower New Inn is positioned where the current Lower New Inn public house is situated. A number of other areas are also detailed including a small holding called Jerusalem which today gives its name to Jerusalem Lane (which was then the unitary district boundary). Of interest on this map is a wood opposite the School called "Black Plantation" that still exists today. A chapel is also recorded in Lower New Inn (now the Congregation Chapel). By 1910 the village's population was around 800.

By 1922 a lot of additional residential housing has been built around the Ruth Road and Coed-y-Canddo areas containing predominantly housing accommodating more prosperous railway workers. A terrace of housing was also built along the Highway between Berry's Corner and the Methodist Church. The polo ground is also detailed on this map for the first time. Panteg cemetery also appears for the first time. Curiously the centre of the village is named "Pontypool Road" on a 1922 map.

By 1944 a number of key roads in the village appear including Golf Road, Woodfield Road and The Walk. Of interest are the still-standing bungalows built during the Second World War along The Walk for key workers at ROF Glascoed. The map also includes the expansion of the Clarewain Estate (built on a former farm of that name). Much of the north side of the Highway towards the railway station now has housing. The main roads forming the Coed-y-canddo estate are now in evidence. As in 1922, the centre of the village is still referred to as "Pontypool Road". A similar map of 1947 again calls the current village centre "Pontypool Road" with Upper New Inn listed as slightly south of this and Lower New Inn mentioned where the current public house in (Middle New Inn is no longer mentioned).

Council housing was built in the early 1950s on Caroline Road and adjacent roads as well as in the lower New Inn area (known as the Lancaster Road estate). Further post-war developments included the 'Heol Felin' housing estate (all roads begin Heol (Welsh for road)) built throughout the 1960s and into the early 1970s. The Golf Road development followed from the late 1960s into the 1970s and grew further with additional developments in the 1980s. The more recent development has seen the former Walker Steel industrial area, originally Pilkingtons glass works, (which itself had been built on what was known as the Admiralty sidings) between the railway and the canal was developed into the Coed Camlas housing estate.

The village is now bypassed by the A4042. This dual carriageway provides rapid access to rest of Torfaen, Newport, Cardiff and to Bristol via the M4 corridor.

In 2018 Torfaen Borough Council updated local road signage to incorporate a Welsh language name for the village - Y Dafarn Newydd. Prior to this the village had only been known as New Inn.

The Welsh language name Y Dafarn Newydd was made official in October 2026 alongside the English name "New Inn".

== Amenities ==
St. Mary’s Church, Panteg is the local Church in Wales church which is nestled a little way from the village centre to the south east. New Inn Congregational Church meet in the Chapel building at the south end of the village. Also at the south end of the village was Panteg Methodist Church, which closed in December 2021. The village contains St Mary's Church Hall (1930), the New Inn Chapel Hall, New Inn Community Hall (previously Panteg Public Hall) shops and small convenience stores along The Highway.

Within the village are two public houses - The Teazer and Lower New Inn - and the members-only Greenlawn Social Club. New Inn's central post office closed in 2016; a small sub-post office operates within the local Spa.

A football pitch (where New Inn play) and changing rooms, tennis courts as well as a children's play area are clustered near the centre of New Inn. Jarrold's Field, off New Road is a large recreational space with several rugby and football pitches and is home to New Panteg RFC and the New Inn Junior and Youth Football Clubs.

The main local school is New Inn Primary School for 4 – 11-year-olds. It was formed by the amalgamation of Greenlawn Junior School and New Inn Infants' School in 2006. The former New Inn infants’ school has been renovated into a family learning centre.

A fire station situated on New Road serves Pontypool, Griffithstown, Sebastopol and New Inn, and the surrounding villages of Little Mill and Penperlleni.

The village is close to the southernmost reach of the Brecon Beacons National Park. Immediately east of part of the village is Llandegfedd Reservoir, popular for surface water sports such as wind-surfing and coarse fishing.

== Railway ==
The former Pontypool Road station is now an island platform (reached by subway) following the demolition of the old railway buildings and booking hall during the late 20th century. The two platforms cater for trains travelling south to Cwmbran and one for travel north to Abergavenny and beyond. It was renamed Pontypool & New Inn station in 1994.

== Gallery of New Inn photographs ==
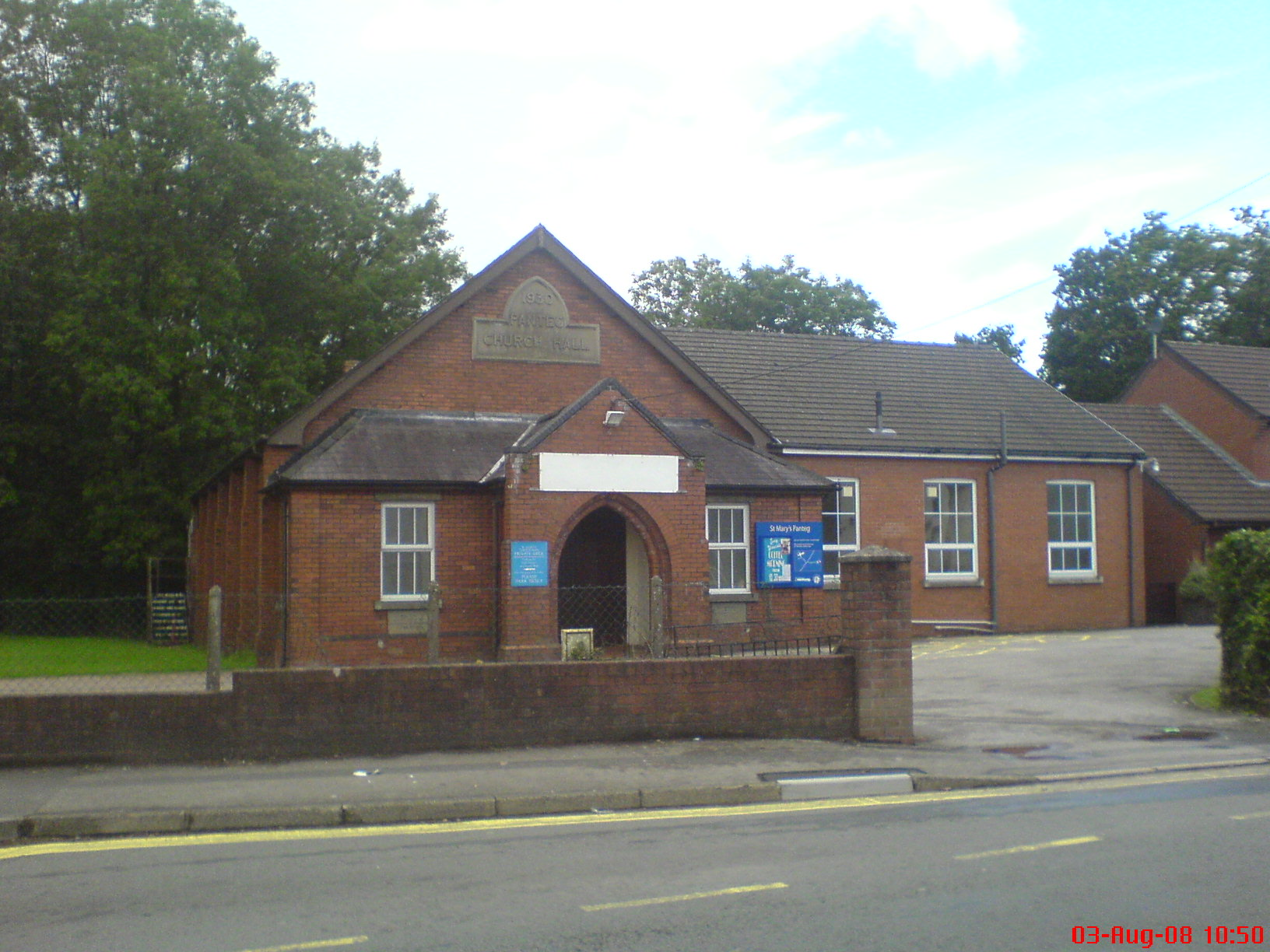
St Mary's Panteg Church Hall

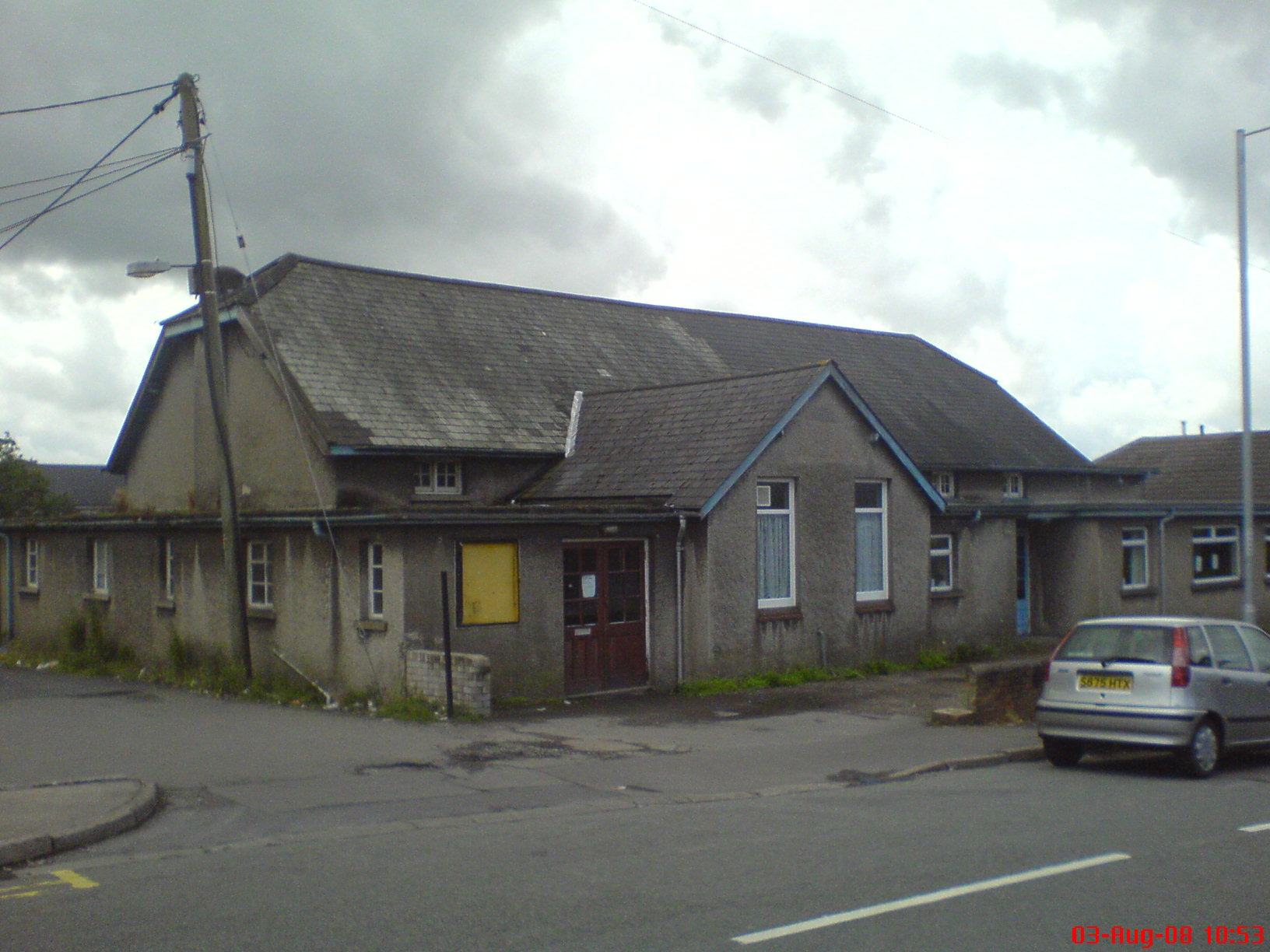
New Inn Community Hall (previously Panteg Public Hall)

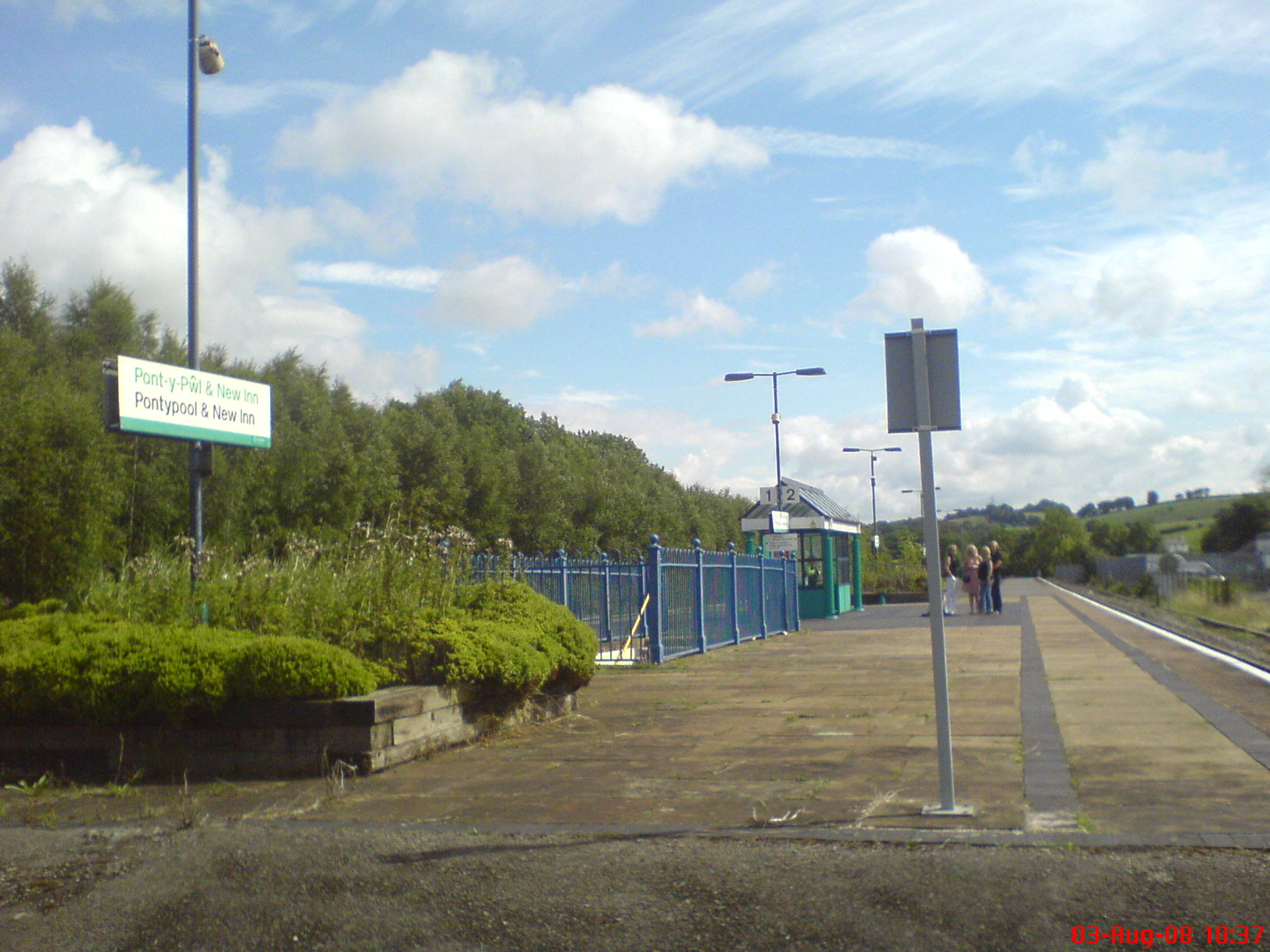
Pontypool & New Inn station

== Demographic indicators ==
All data from 2001 Census.

Total population of 6,349 (Torfaen 90,949). 48.5% Male, 51.5% Female (Torfaen - 48.4% Male, 51.6% Female). Age Structure: 18.8% aged between 0-15, 34.5% aged between 16-44, 25.9% aged 45–59/64 and 20.8% of pensionable age.

Socio-Economic Indicators

Activity Rates (2001) Male (16-74) economic activity rate 71.1% (Torfaen 67.8%, Wales 67.7%), female (16-74) economic activity rate 60.3% (Torfaen 54.2%, Wales 54.5%), total economic activity rate 65.6% (Torfaen 60.8%, Wales 61.0%).

Unemployment (2004)

37 people registered unemployed, 19 males and 18 females (June 2004). Of the 37 claimants, 5 are under 24 years of age. There is no-one registered as long term unemployed (unemployed for over 52 weeks).

Home Ownership (2001)

New Inn has a higher proportion of owner occupied households at 82.3% than Torfaen 68.3% and Wales as a whole 71.3%. 9.2% of properties are rented from the local authority (Torfaen 22.8%, Wales 13.7%)

Car Ownership (2001)

16.6% of households in New Inn do not own a car (Torfaen 27.2%, Wales 26.0%).

Education (2001)

Residents qualified to Level 4/5: 20.1% (Torfaen 13.6%, Wales 17.4%). (Level 4/5: First degree, Higher degree, NVQ levels 4 and 5, HNC, HND, Qualified Teacher status, Qualified Medical Doctor, Qualified Dentist, Qualified Nurse, Midwife, Health Visitor)

Lone Parent Families (2001)

6.8% of all households in New Inn are occupied by lone parents (Torfaen 10.8%, Wales 10.6%).

== Trivia ==
New Inn appears as the first property on the Welsh version of Monopoly. The company Biffa is also displayed on the same square.

Edward Thomas Chapman VC is buried in Panteg cemetery, New Inn.

== Railways ==
Pontypool & New Inn station is on the Welsh Marches Line.
