= Panteg =

Panteg: Welsh: Pant-teg
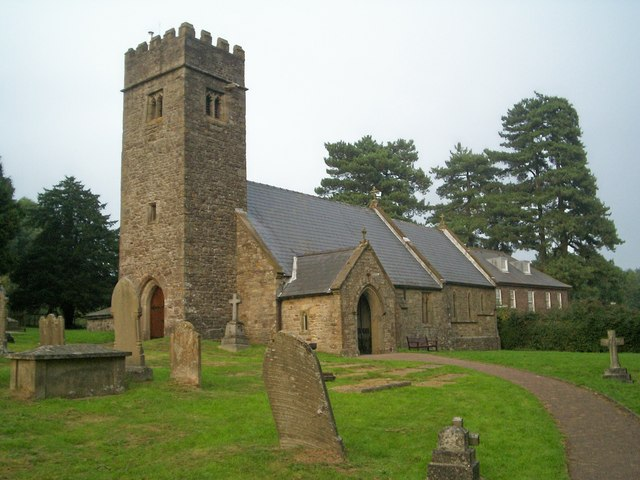
- St Mary's Church, Panteg

- Location within Torfaen
- Area: 3.22 km^{2} (1.24 sq mi)
- Population: 7,217 (2011)
  - Density: 2,241/km^{2} (5,800/sq mi)
- OS grid reference: ST 294 989
- Community: Panteg
- Principal area: Torfaen
- Preserved county: Gwent
- Country: Wales
- Sovereign state: United Kingdom
- Post town: PONTYPOOL
- Postcode district: NP4
- Dialling code: 01495
- Police: Gwent
- Fire: South Wales
- Ambulance: Welsh
- UK Parliament: Torfaen
- Senedd Cymru – Welsh Parliament: Torfaen
- List of places UK Wales Torfaen 51.684858°N 3.021899°W Map of the community

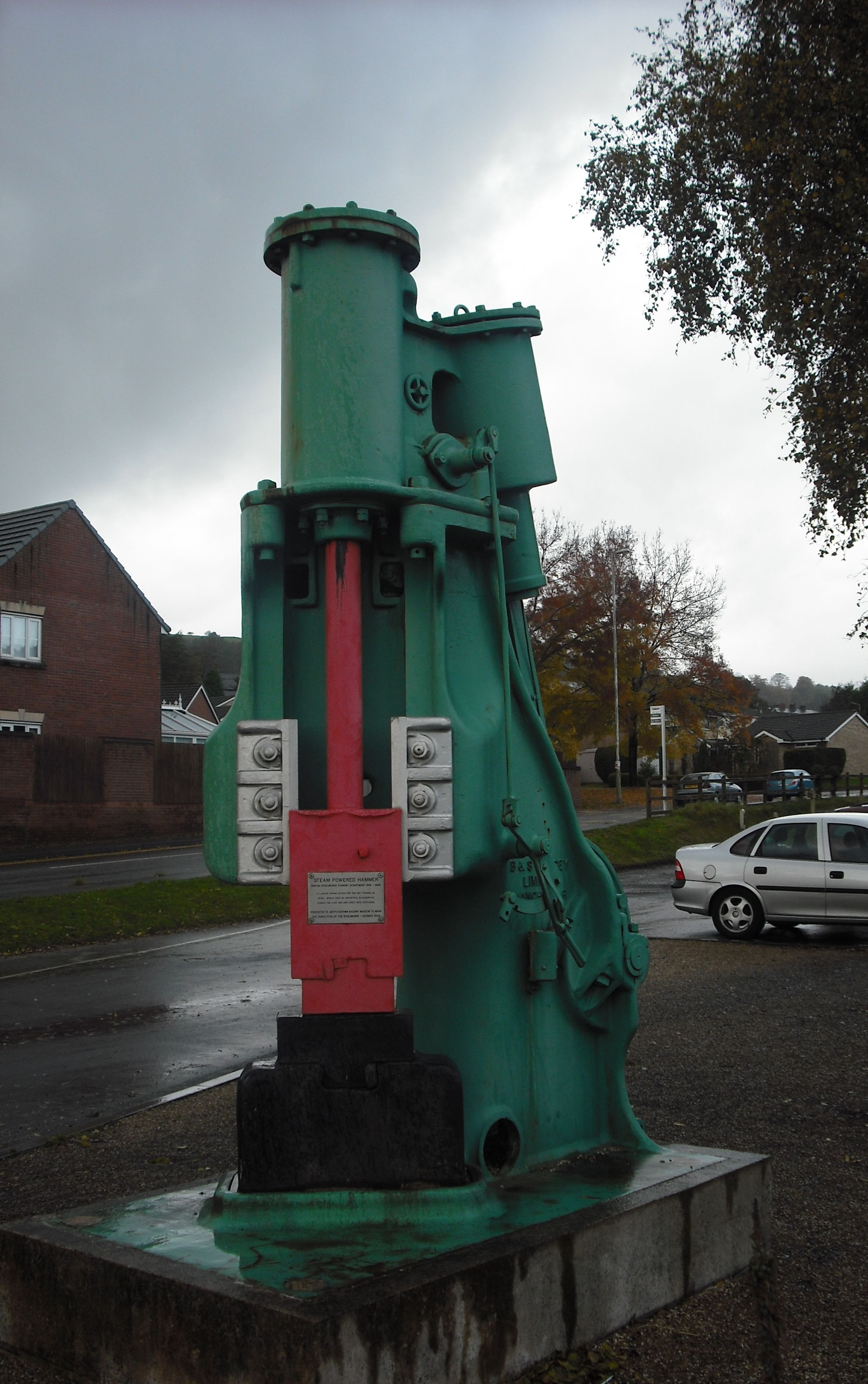
A steam hammer from Panteg steelworks is preserved outside the Griffithstown railway museum

Panteg (Welsh: Pant-teg) is a large village and community in the county borough of Torfaen, Wales. It is adjacent to Griffithstown, between the towns of Cwmbran and Pontypool. The village is best known for Panteg Steel Works, which closed in 2004.

Prior to 1935 Panteg was also an urban district. It had a population of 11,499 in 1931. It was amalgamated with Pontypool in 1935. It is now a community and electoral ward of Torfaen.

== Notable people ==
See Category:People from Panteg

- Edwin Stevens, inventor and philanthropist
- Herbert Armitage James, who was Headmaster of Rugby School and later President of St John's College, Oxford, grew up in Panteg and is commemorated by a memorial in the parish church, where his father was rector from 1856 to 1871.
- Edward Thomas Chapman, a winner of the Victoria Cross in the Second World War, is buried in Panteg cemetery, which is located a few miles from St Mary's church.
- Ian Gough, Ryan Powell and Lloyd Burns, Wales rugby union international players
- Steve Parry, avant-garde guitarist and founder of Hwyl Nofio, was born and lived in Panteg.

== See also ==
- County Hospital, often referred to as Panteg Hospital
- Panteg cemetery
- Panteg and Griffithstown railway station
