= Nick Thomas-Symonds =

British politician (born 1980)

The Right Honourable Nick Thomas-Symonds MP FRHistS
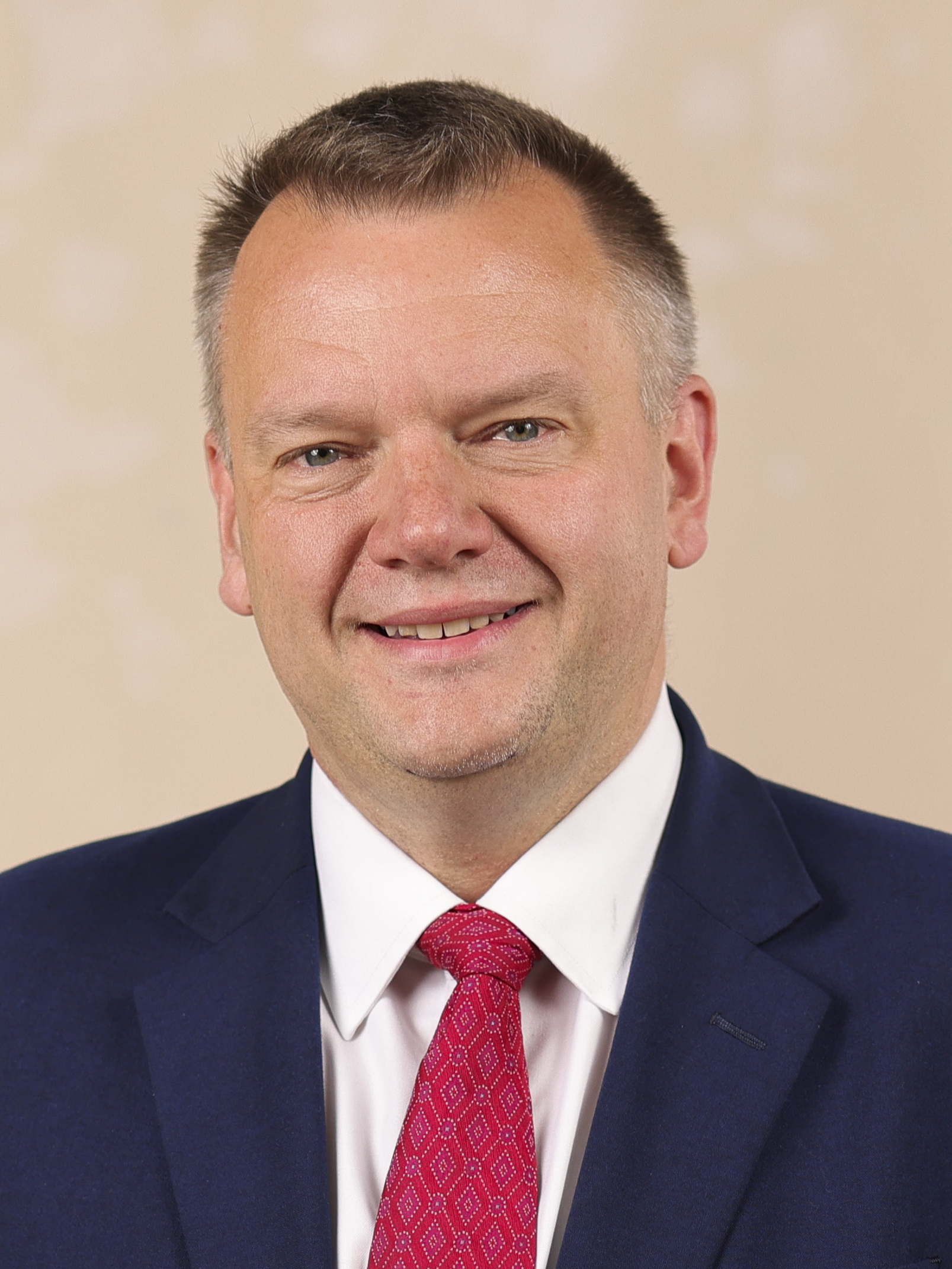
- Official portrait, 2024

Minister for the Cabinet Office Paymaster General
- In office 8 July 2024 – 20 July 2026
- Prime Minister: Keir Starmer
- Preceded by: John Glen
- Succeeded by: Louise Haigh (Note: as Minister for the Cabinet Office); James Murray (Note: as Paymaster General)

Minister for the Constitution and European Union Relations
- In office 8 July 2024 – 20 July 2026
- Prime Minister: Keir Starmer
- Preceded by: Esther McVey
- Succeeded by: Hamish Falconer
Shadow portfolios
Shadow Cabinet
2023–2024	Minister without Portfolio
2021–2023	President of the Board of Trade, International Trade
2020–2021	Home Secretary
Shadow Minister
2017–2020	Security
2016–2020	Solicitor General
2016	Employment
2015–2016	Pensions

Member of Parliament for Torfaen
- Incumbent
- Assumed office 7 May 2015
- Preceded by: Paul Murphy
- Majority: 7,322 (20.5%)

Personal details
- Born: Nicklaus Thomas-Symonds; 26 May 1980 (age 46) Griffithstown, Torfaen, Wales
- Party: Labour
- Spouse: Rebecca Nelson (m. 2006)
- Children: 3
- Education: St Edmund Hall, Oxford (BA)
- Website: Official website

Nicklaus Thomas-Symonds FRHistS (born 26 May 1980) is a British academic, barrister and politician who served as Paymaster General, Minister for the Cabinet Office and Minister for the Constitution and European Union Relations from July 2024 to July 2026. A member of Welsh Labour, he has been Member of Parliament (MP) for Torfaen since 2015.

Thomas-Symonds served as Shadow Home Secretary from 2020 to 2021, and held several junior shadow portfolios from 2015 to 2020. Prior to his election to Parliament, he was a chancery and commercial barrister at Civitas Law. He is the author of books on Clement Attlee, Nye Bevan and Harold Wilson.

== Early life and education ==
Thomas-Symonds was born in Panteg Hospital, Griffithstown, Torfaen, and was brought up in Blaenavon. His father was a steelworker and industrial chemist, and his mother was a secretary. He attended St Felix R.C. Primary School, Blaenavon, and St Alban's R.C. High School, Pontypool. He then studied Philosophy, Politics and Economics at St Edmund Hall, Oxford, between 1998 and 2001, where he gained a first.

== Career ==
=== Legal career ===
Thomas-Symonds was called to the bar by Lincoln's Inn in October 2004 and developed a practice specialising in chancery and commercial law.

=== Academic career ===
Thomas-Symonds was appointed a tutor at St Edmund Hall, Oxford at the age of 21. He was later a lecturer in politics at the college, teaching British Politics and Government since 2000; Modern British Government and Politics; Government and Politics of Europe; and Government and Politics of the United States. Thomas-Symonds taught for other Oxford colleges, including Harris Manchester College. He also taught US Politics on the Oxford Department of Continuing Education's "Foundations of Diplomacy" course. Between 2008 and 2009, he was the politics tutor of former White House Press Secretary Kayleigh McEnany. He was elected a fellow of the Royal Historical Society in 2012.

Thomas-Symonds has published three political biographies: Nye: The Political Life of Aneurin Bevan, Attlee: A Life in Politics, and Harold Wilson: the Winner.

=== Political career ===
Thomas-Symonds was selected as prospective Labour parliamentary candidate for his home seat of Torfaen on 7 March 2015 and subsequently won the seat in the general election on 7 May 2015. He made his maiden speech on 28 May 2015.

After a brief stint on the Justice Select Committee, he was appointed Shadow Pensions Minister on 17 September 2015 before being promoted to Shadow Employment Minister on 11 January 2016. He resigned the role of Shadow Employment Minister on 27 June 2016. He later supported Owen Smith in the 2016 Labour Party leadership election.

Thomas-Symonds accepted the position of Shadow Solicitor General on 11 October 2016, and on 3 July 2017 he was appointed as Shadow Security Minister within the Shadow Home Affairs Team.

In his role as Shadow Solicitor General, Thomas-Symonds faced the Attorney General and Solicitor General in the House of Commons throughout the Brexit crisis, in place of the then Shadow Attorney General, Baroness Shami Chakrabarti, who sat in the House of Lords.

During his time in the role, Thomas-Symonds raised the issue of low prosecution rates for rape.

In a debate on 3 December 2018, after The Sunday Times newspaper reported leaked excerpts of a recent letter sent by the Attorney General to Cabinet Ministers detailing legal advice on Prime Minister Theresa May's Brexit deal, Thomas-Symonds accused Cox of hiding his full legal advice on May's Brexit deal "for fear of the political consequences", stating that the government was "playing for time, hoping that the contempt proceedings take longer than the timetable for the meaningful vote". Thomas-Symonds made an application to the Speaker for Parliament to consider holding the Government in contempt of Parliament. The next day, 4 December, the Government was found in contempt of Parliament.

Separately, Thomas-Symonds promoted reform of the structure of Bar professional training courses, to open up the profession to people from a range of backgrounds, arguing that in their current form a disproportionate number of places were being offered on courses when compared with the total opportunities for pupillage.

Upon becoming Shadow Security Minister in July 2017, Thomas-Symonds said cybersecurity was one of his top priorities.

Thomas-Symonds successfully convinced the Government to accept amendments to the Counterterrorism and Border Security Bill that nullified the risk the bill posed to removing the right to private legal advice.

He has served as Chair of four All-Party Parliamentary Groups: Off-Patent Drugs; Industrial Heritage; Legal & Constitutional Affairs; and Archives & History.

Thomas-Symonds was drawn in the ballot for a Private Members' Bill on 4 June 2015, and introduced the Off-Patent Drugs Bill. This ran out of time at Second Reading on 6 November 2015, but substantial parts of the Bill were later incorporated into the Access to Medical Treatments (Innovation) Bill on 29 January 2016. As a result of promises secured by Thomas-Symonds, the British National Formulary has started to include off-label drugs in its new indication where there is sufficient evidence.

On 8 December 2015, Nick Thomas-Symonds was chosen as 'Member to Watch' at the Welsh Politician of the Year Awards.

He is a member of the Fabian Society.

==== Shadow Home Secretary ====
In April 2020, Thomas-Symonds was appointed as Shadow Home Secretary by Sir Keir Starmer, succeeding Diane Abbott. Amongst his first acts in post, Thomas-Symonds called on the Home Secretary, Rt Hon Priti Patel MP, to provide additional funding for organisations tackling domestic abuse.

During the passage of the Immigration Bill, Thomas-Symonds pressed for the Government to abolish the Immigration Health Surcharge. In a U-Turn, Prime Minister Boris Johnson agreed to abolish it for health workers in May 2020.

Following the murder of George Floyd on 25 May 2020, Thomas-Symonds urged the Prime Minister to "show leadership" in addressing structural racism and inequality.

Following the Reading terror attack in June 2020, Thomas-Symonds laid flowers at the scene and called for a judge-led review into lone attackers.

On immigration, Thomas-Symonds argued that the Conservatives lacked compassion and competence.

In his first speech to party conference – the virtual "Labour Connect" of 2020, Thomas-Symonds spoke of Labour's "duty to tackle and prevent crime" and that his role "was to convince people that Labour will keep you, your family and your community safe".

In January 2021, it was revealed that 400,000 pieces of police data had been accidentally deleted from the Police National Computer. Thomas-Symonds said: "You do not make our streets safer by losing such a substantial amount of information about criminal behaviour."

During the COVID-19 pandemic, Thomas-Symonds argued for better protections at the border, including comprehensive hotel quarantining for arrivals in the UK.

On 12 February 2021, it was confirmed that Thomas-Symonds was to be sworn of Her Majesty's Privy Council.

In March 2021, Thomas-Symonds criticised the Government's Police, Crime, Sentencing and Courts Bill, which was at this time being debated in the House of Commons, for provisions which, he said, put protection of statues before the protection of women.

In May 2021, alongside celebrities and other public figures, Thomas-Symonds was a signatory to an open letter from Stylist magazine which called on the government to address what it described as an "epidemic of male violence" by funding an "ongoing, high-profile, expert-informed awareness campaign on men's violence against women and girls".

==== Shadow International Trade Secretary ====
In the November 2021 shadow cabinet reshuffle, he was demoted to Shadow Secretary of State for International Trade.

Thomas-Symonds said it was "crucial that human rights, women's rights and workers' rights are embedded" in the UK trade negotiations. "When negotiating for new opportunities in exchange for our access to our markets, we must seek to promote high standards." Thomas-Symonds urged action in trade deals to tackle climate change and criticised the UK Government for failing to include an explicit commitment to limiting global warming to 1.5 degrees in the UK-Australia trade deal.

Thomas-Symonds prioritised steel exports in his first intervention, writing to International Trade Secretary Anne-Marie Trevelyan, urging her to negotiate with the United States to the section 232 steel tariffs imposed by President Donald Trump in 2018. A deal was eventually reached on 23 March 2022.

In his first full interview, Thomas-Symonds said that the British public had been promised a US–UK trade deal and that one should be delivered. When Prime Minister Liz Truss confirmed, on 20 September 2022, that there would be no US–UK trade negotiations in the short-to-medium term, Thomas-Symonds said: "The admission that there is no prospect of a trade deal with the USA is terrible news for the economy."

On 3 March 2022, following the Russian invasion of Ukraine, Nick Thomas-Symonds called on the UK to place a total ban on exporting luxury goods to Russia to target the "Mayfair lifestyle" enjoyed by President Putin and his inner circle.

On 2 August 2022, Thomas-Symonds was named as one of the 39 UK personalities banned from entering Russia.

On 28 January 2023, Thomas-Symonds criticised the Conservative Government for failing to keep its manifesto promises on trade: "it's so frustrating of me to see the failure of the Government in trade. We've just passed the end of 2022. That was the point at which 80 per cent of our trade was meant to be covered by free-trade agreements according to the 2019 Conservative manifesto.

Two days later, on 30 January 2023, Thomas-Symonds hosted a Global Trade Reception where Labour hosted 100 ambassadors, diplomats and high commissioners – including from the US, Canada, France and Germany – as well as over 200 business leaders. At the event, Thomas-Symonds said that Labour was "pro-business, pro-trade and pro-worker".

==== Paymaster General ====
On 8 July 2024, he was appointed Paymaster General, Minister for the Cabinet Office and Minister for the Constitution and European Union Relations, as the Government's Lead Negotiator on the UK-EU 'Reset' negotiations. A close ally of Sir Keir Starmer his strategy was to make progress across three pillars: first, security and defence; second, citizens’ safety, covering serious and organised crime, including people smuggling; and third, trade and growth.

On 4 February 2025, in a speech at the UK-EU Forum, Nick Thomas-Symonds declared: "the time for ideologically-driven division is over…the time for ruthless pragmatism is now."

On 7 May 2025, Nick Thomas-Symonds indicated that the Government would be open to agreeing a “smart, controlled” Youth Mobility Scheme with the EU.

On 19 May 2025, at the first post-Brexit UK-EU Summit at Lancaster House, the UK and the EU agreed a new Strategic Partnership including: a Security and Defence Partnership; a sanitary and phytosanitary agreement reducing trade barriers in agri-food products, food, and drink; energy; crime and irregular migration; and on eGates. Nick Thomas-Symonds declared that the “UK-EU Strategic Partnership…delivers on jobs, bills and borders.

Andrew Marr wrote in the New Statesman that Nick Thomas-Symonds was "the brain behind Labour's EU deal" and asked: "with his talk of "ruthless pragmatism", is Nick Thomas-Symonds the heir to Harold Wilson?".

== Personal life ==
Thomas-Symonds is married, and has three children and supports Liverpool.

== Selected works ==
- Thomas-Symonds, Nicklaus (2010). Attlee: a life in politics. London: I.B. Tauris. ISBN 978-1845117795.
- Thomas-Symonds, Nicklaus (2014). Nye: The Political Life of Aneurin Bevan. London: I.B. Tauris. ISBN 978-1780762098.
- Thomas-Symonds, Nick (2022). Harold Wilson: The Winner. Orion Publishing Co. ISBN 978-1474611954.

=== Articles ===
- "The Battle of Grosmont, 1405: A Reinterpretation". Gwent Local History. 97. Gareth McCann (research). Autumn 2004.
- Thomas-Symonds, Nick (Spring 2005). "A Reinterpretation of Michael Foot's Handling of the Militant Tendency". Contemporary British History. 19 (1): 27–51. doi:10.1080/1361946042000303846. S2CID 143832214.
- "Oratory, Rhetoric and Politics: Neil Kinnock's Thousand Generations Speech of 1987". Llafur: Journal of the Welsh People's History Society. 9 (3). 2006.
- "The Hard Sell: When does a new car actually belong to the purchaser?". Solicitors' Journal. 154 (35). 21 September 2010.
- Thomas-Symonds, Nicklaus; Youngs, Raymond (July 2013). "The Problem of the "Lame Duck" Government: A Critique of the Fixed-term Parliaments Act". Parliamentary Affairs. 66 (3): 540–556. doi:10.1093/pa/gss001.

== Notes ==
Parliament of the United Kingdom
Preceded by Paul Murphy	Member of Parliament for Torfaen; 2015–present	Incumbent
Political offices
Preceded by Diane Abbott	Shadow Home Secretary; 2020–2021	Succeeded by Yvette Cooper
Preceded by John Glen	Minister for the Cabinet Office; 2024–2026	Succeeded by Louise Haigh
Preceded by John Glen	Paymaster General; 2024–2026	Succeeded by James Murray
