= Sebastopol, Torfaen =

Coordinates: 51.679°N 3.025°W

Sebastopol
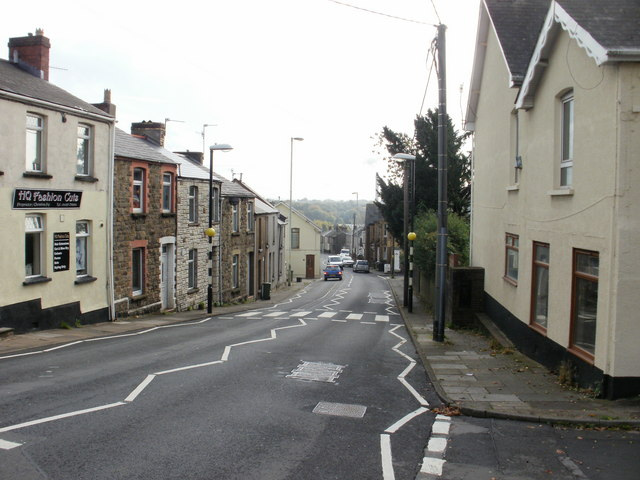
- South Street
- Principal area: Torfaen
- Preserved county: Gwent
- Country: Wales
- Sovereign state: United Kingdom
- Post town: Pontypool
- Postcode district: NP4
- Dialling code: 01495
- Police: Gwent
- Fire: South Wales
- Ambulance: Welsh
- UK Parliament: Torfaen

Sebastopol is the southernmost suburb of Pontypool in the county borough of Torfaen, within the historic boundaries of Monmouthshire in South Wales. It is named in honour of the Crimean city Sevastopol (also known as Sebastopol) that was taken during the Crimean War. It is a working-class area consisting of mainly privately owned terraced houses and a substantial number of local authority/ex-local authority housing (known as the Kemys Fawr Estate).

== Layout ==
Today Sebastopol is a large community that is all but merged with nearby Griffithstown - the boundary being along Cwrdy Road, across Panteg Cricket Club, the Open Hearth and Griffithstown Railway Goods Shed on Station Road. Like nearby New Inn, Sebastopol does not have a central village area, but is spread out along its main thoroughfares South Street & Greenhill Road.

== Amenities ==
The settlement has few large landmarks such as Panteg House, Panteg Park, The Crown (built in 1859) and Iestyn's Fish Bar. It has three general shops: two on South Street and one on The Avenue (Kemys Fawr Estate). Its wider economy includes many second-hand car salesrooms on Station Road, "The Open Hearth" (originally the Railway Inn) and "Sebastopol Social Club" pubs. From 1873 to 2004, the main employer for the area was Panteg Steelworks.

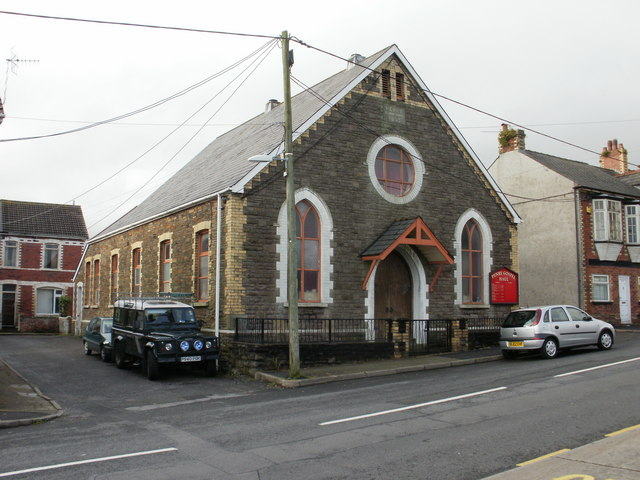
Penry Gospel Hall

There are two churches: Penry Gospel Hall and St. Oswald's Anglican Church, but most ecclesiastical needs are met by Griffithstown. Kemys Fawr Infant & Nursery School was located on the Kemys Fawr Estate to provide education for 3 - 7 year olds however, the School was closed (approx 2018) and demolished the ground was used to build Houses and Flats; children then mainly attend Griffithstown Junior School for further schooling. Until April 2012 there was also a special education school: Crownbridge School, catering for pupils in the age range 3 - 19 with severe learning difficulties; this has relocated to the grounds of Croesyceiliog School in Cwmbran. There is a park near Kemys Fawr Infant & Nursery School with a football pitch.

The Monmouthshire Canal, built in the 1790s, runs through Sebastopol from Brecon on its way to Newport.

== South Sebastopol (Edlogan Wharf) development ==
Since 1996 local residents resisted plans of developers put forward under the Local Plan of Torfaen County Borough Council to build homes and small business premises on a large green fields area. To be known as "South Sebastopol", a wide tract of new housing would fill the gap between the Pontypool district suburbs of northern Torfaen to the Cwmbran district suburbs of southern Torfaen. In 2011 outline plans drawn were refused by the council. Detailed plans were approved in October 2014, and work started in April 2016.

As of 2019, there are three property developers building estates within South Sebastopol, the largest being Edlogan Wharf by Taylor Wimpey, followed by Hanbury Village by Barratt and Pastures Green by Lewis.

== Notable people ==
- Terry Hubbard (born 1950), Welsh former professional footballer
- James Waite, Welsh professional footballer
