= Panteg Steel Works =

Coordinates: 51°40′45″N 3°1′9″W

Panteg Steel Works (on left incl. chimneys) and Panteg and Griffithstown railway station (on right), date unknown.

The Panteg Steel Works was situated in the village of Panteg, adjacent to Sebastopol, and Griffithstown, in the district of Torfaen, South Wales. The steel works was founded in 1873, and operated for over 130 years until its closure in 2004. A number of 'firsts' occurred at Panteg Steel Works during its long life, including the first full production of stainless steel in the UK outside Sheffield in 1944, the installation of the first production vertical caster in the UK in 1960 and the commissioning of British Steel's first Argon Oxygen Decarburizer in 1972. Planning permission was given to turn the works into residential housing in 2010, when the site became the Parc Panteg housing estate.

== History ==
In 1873 the Panteg Steel and Engineering Company Ltd was founded by Sampson Copestake & Co, to produce steel rails and other items for export to India. The works were supervised by Captain J.R. Wright, Isaac Butler and Benjamin Smith. It is claimed that the first sheet steel in Britain was rolled in Staffordshire in 1876 from a bloom made in Panteg by Isaac Butler. In 1882 the site was acquired by Wright, Butler and Co Ltd. The works was taken over by Baldwins Ltd in 1902 and a Wellman furnace charging machine was installed, the first machine of its kind to be introduced in Wales. During the First World War, Panteg Steel Works was engaged in making steel for munitions, much like other steel works throughout Britain.

In 1935 an electric arc furnace of 5 tons capacity was introduced, followed by 10 ton electric arc furnaces in 1940 and an increase in electrical capacity in 1944. These developments enabled production to be increased during the Second World War, when Panteg produced armour plating, armour piercing steel and high manganese steel for helmets. In 1945 Baldwins Ltd merged with Richard Thomas Ltd to form Richard Thomas and Baldwins (RTB) Ltd. Panteg then became one of the leading producers of high-grade alloy steels, including stainless steels. In 1951 the works was nationalised briefly under the Iron & Steel Corporation of Great Britain, but later in 1951 it reverted to Richard Thomas & Baldwins Ltd and a cold strip plant was installed.

In 1957 Arthur J. Pritchard described how Panteg Steel Works had enjoyed thirty years of good industrial relations, unlike many other sites of heavy industry during the same period. He gave the credit for this to a management policy known as "Sociability", which included a social club and a welfare programme. The social club was located at Panteg House, which had previously been the residence of the Managing-Director, and offered a range of leisure facilities aimed at both workers and management. These included reading rooms, games rooms, bar, concert room, canteen and space for music and dramatic productions. Outside there were facilities for sports including football, cricket and tennis. The works also provided a medical service which consisted of a surgery and a doctor who was available for consultation by all staff, regardless of their status. By providing valued benefits, and enabling a culture of interaction and discussion, Pritchard believed that the management of Panteg Steel Works had made it easy to find agreement when round the negotiating table, and so avoid disruptive clashes with the workforce.

In 1967 Panteg Steel Works became part of the British Steel Corporation (BSC) and a new melting shop was built in 1971. The works became part of British Steel Plc in 1988 and a Horizontal Continuous Billet Casting Machine was introduced. By this stage 900 employees were producing stainless steel for a variety of products including beer kegs, sinks, hospital equipment and vehicle trim.

In 1992 the site was taken over by Avesta Sheffield Ltd, a company formed from the merger of British Steel Stainless Ltd and the Swedish company Avesta AB. Between 1992 and 1996, worldwide investment in the Stainless Long Products industry reached an intense level and competition from larger steel works put the Panteg Melting Shop under severe pressure. Although the work-force made determined efforts to remain competitive, closure of the melting shop was announced in September 1996. On 12 December 1996, the last furnace of cast steel was made at Panteg, but stainless steel coil processing of over 50,000 tonnes per annum continued.
