= Paul Murphy, Baron Murphy of Torfaen =

British Labour Party politician

The Right Honourable The Lord Murphy of Torfaen KCMCO KSG PC
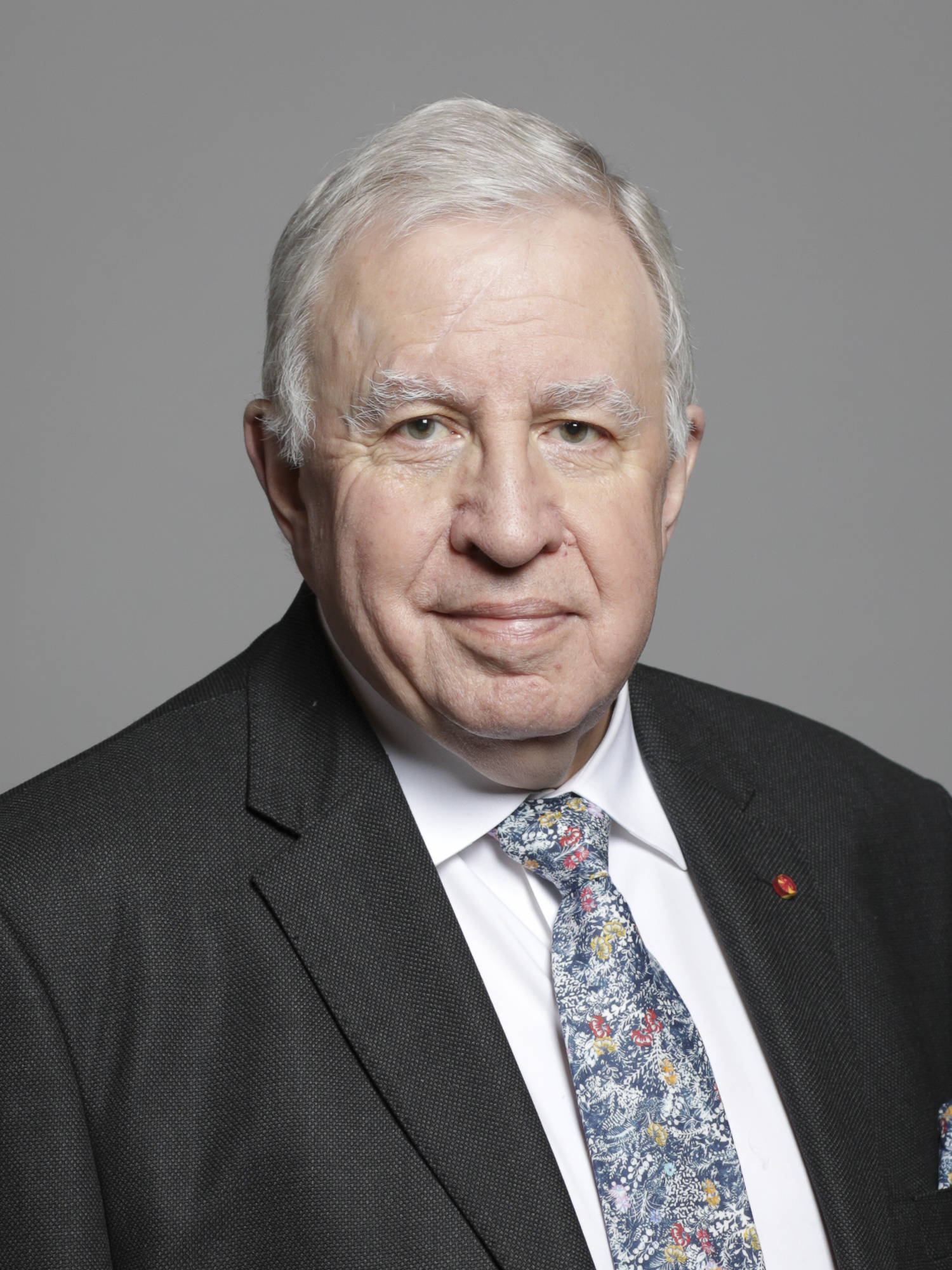
- Official portrait, 2019

Secretary of State for Wales
- In office 24 January 2008 – 5 June 2009
- Prime Minister: Gordon Brown
- Preceded by: Peter Hain
- Succeeded by: Peter Hain
- In office 28 July 1999 – 24 October 2002
- Prime Minister: Tony Blair
- Preceded by: Alun Michael
- Succeeded by: Peter Hain

Chair of the Intelligence and Security Committee
- In office 6 May 2005 – 24 January 2008
- Preceded by: Ann Taylor
- Succeeded by: Margaret Beckett

Secretary of State for Northern Ireland
- In office 24 October 2002 – 6 May 2005
- Prime Minister: Tony Blair
- Preceded by: John Reid
- Succeeded by: Peter Hain

First Minister of Northern Ireland
- as Secretary of State for Northern Ireland
- In office 24 October 2002 – 6 May 2005
- Monarch: Elizabeth II
- Prime Minister: Tony Blair
- Preceded by: John Reid
- Succeeded by: Peter Hain

Member of the House of Lords
- Lord Temporal
- Life peerage 20 October 2015

Member of Parliament for Torfaen
- In office 11 June 1987 – 30 March 2015
- Preceded by: Leo Abse
- Succeeded by: Nick Thomas-Symonds

Personal details
- Born: 25 November 1948 (age 77) Usk, Monmouthshire, Wales
- Party: Labour
- Education: Oriel College, Oxford

Paul Peter Murphy, Baron Murphy of Torfaen, KCMCO, KSG, PC (born 25 November 1948) is a British Labour Party politician who was the Member of Parliament (MP) for Torfaen from 1987 to 2015, and served in the Cabinet from 1999 to 2005 and again from 2008 to 2009 in the roles of Northern Irish and Welsh Secretary. He was nominated for a life peerage in the 2015 Dissolution Honours.

== Background ==
Paul Peter Murphy was born to Ronald and Marjorie (née Gough) Murphy. He has a younger brother, Neil. Murphy's father, Ronald, was a miner of Irish descent. The family was devoutly Catholic. His mother, Marjorie (née Gough), was English, and her family were businesspeople.

Paul Murphy attended St Francis Roman Catholic School, Abersychan and West Monmouth School, Pontypool. He later attended Oriel College, Oxford to study history. He was a management trainee with the CWS, before becoming a lecturer in Government and History at Ebbw Vale College of Further Education, now part of Coleg Gwent. He has never married. Murphy once said in an interview "I have so many books, there's only enough room for me".

== Early political career ==
Murphy joined the Labour Party at age 15, and was a member of the Transport and General Workers Union. He was Secretary of the Pontypool/Torfaen Constituency Labour Party from 1971 to 1987. He was a member of Torfaen Council from 1973 to 1987 and was chair of its finance committee from 1976 to 1986. He contested Wells constituency in Somerset in the 1979 general election.

== Senior Cabinet posts ==
He was MP for Torfaen, Wales from the 1987 election. In opposition he served as a foreign affairs spokesperson and then in Defence as navy spokesperson.

Following the 1997 election Murphy was appointed to the position of Minister of State for Northern Ireland.

He joined the cabinet in July 1999 following his appointment as Secretary of State for Wales on 28 July 1999. In 2002 he moved departments and became Secretary of State for Northern Ireland, a role in which he served until his dismissal in the reshuffle that followed the 2005 general election, when he became chairman of the Intelligence and Security Committee. He also served as the British chair of the British-Irish Inter-Parliamentary Body and an executive committee member of the British-American Parliamentary Group.

Following the resignation of Peter Hain from the cabinet on 24 January 2008, he was again appointed Secretary of State for Wales he was also given the job of chairing a new Cabinet Committee on the sensitive issue of IT and information security, in the wake of a rash of scandals surrounding the loss of personal data by Government agencies. In April 2008 he was appointed as the Government's Minister for Digital Inclusion. Prior to joining the Cabinet he was Minister of State for political development in the Northern Ireland Office from 1997 to 1999 – acting as Mo Mowlam's deputy – and was largely responsible for negotiating the so-called strand two ('North-South' or 'Island of Ireland') arrangements agreed in the Good Friday Agreement.

He left the cabinet in 2009 when he was replaced as Welsh Secretary by Peter Hain following the clearance of accusations against Hain of election donations.

In 2013, Murphy wrote a report on the lack of success of applicants to Oxbridge universities from Welsh state schools. The report suggested the creation of the Seren Network, a set of regional hubs to link schools to top universities.

== Voting record ==
In 1979 Murphy was a fierce opponent of devolution. Murphy recently said "I have been trying to work out whether or not I am a devo-sceptic and I have come to the conclusion that I am not. In 1978, I was a devo-opponent, and in 1997 I voted for devolution. My constituents agreed with me in 1978, but they did not agree with me in 1997, because they voted against a Welsh Assembly on both occasions. However, I would rather describe myself as a devo-realist, in the sense that what is here is here. I am not all that keen on a coalition in Cardiff, but we are where we are, and we have to work in the current political climate for the benefit of the people whom we represent, whether we are members of parliament, Assembly Members or members of local authorities".

In a free parliamentary vote on 20 May 2008, Murphy voted for cutting the upper limit for abortions from 24 to 12 weeks, along with two other Catholic cabinet ministers Ruth Kelly and Des Browne.

In February 2013, Murphy voted against the second reading of the Marriage (Same Sex Couples) Act 2013. Subsequently, in May 2013 the MP voted against the bill's third and final reading, opposing the legalisation of same-sex marriage within England and Wales.

== Parliamentary expenses ==
Murphy was subject to criticism over his expenses claims, revealed by the Daily Telegraph during the United Kingdom parliamentary expenses scandal. Most notable of these was his £3,419.25 claim to have a new boiler installed in his Westminster house, stating that the previous one was a hazard as "The hot water was far too hot".

Other claims submitted by Paul Murphy relate to purchases of a toilet roll holder, new carpeting and a television, as well as mortgage payments and stamp duty. Murphy was ordered to repay some of the money improperly "claimed back" in the amount of £2,237.72 in cleaning costs, mortgage payments and a wardrobe that exceeded the guideline price.

== Personal life ==
Murphy was created a life peer taking the title Baron Murphy of Torfaen, of Abersychan in the County of Gwent on 20 October 2015.

He is a member of the Oxford and Cambridge Club.

Parliament of the United Kingdom
Preceded by Leo Abse	Member of Parliament for Torfaen; 1987–2015	Succeeded by Nick Thomas-Symonds
Political offices
Preceded by Alun Michael	Secretary of State for Wales; 1999–2002	Succeeded by Peter Hain
Preceded by John Reid	Secretary of State for Northern Ireland; 2002–2005	Succeeded by Peter Hain
Preceded by Ann Taylor	Chairperson of the Intelligence and Security Committee; 2005–2008	Succeeded by Margaret Beckett
Preceded by Peter Hain	Secretary of State for Wales; 2008–2009	Succeeded by Peter Hain
Orders of precedence in the United Kingdom
Preceded by The Lord Beith	Gentlemen; Baron Murphy of Torfaen	Followed by The Lord Livermore
