= Terry Hubbard =

Welsh footballer

Personal information
- Full name: Terence John Hubbard
- Date of birth: 6 November 1950 (age 75)
- Place of birth: Sebastopol, Pontypool, Wales
- Position: Midfielder

Senior career*
Years	Team	Apps	(Gls)
1970–1976	Swindon Town	82	(3)
1976–1977	Swansea City	0	(0)
1977–1979	Yeovil Town		
- * Club domestic league appearances and goals

Terence John Hubbard (born 6 November 1950) is a Welsh former professional footballer who played as a midfielder in the Football League for Swindon Town. He was on the books of Swansea City, without representing them in the League, and also played for Yeovil Town. Hubbard played for his country at schoolboy and under-23 levels.
