= Rhian Cleverly =

Welsh footballer (born 1995)

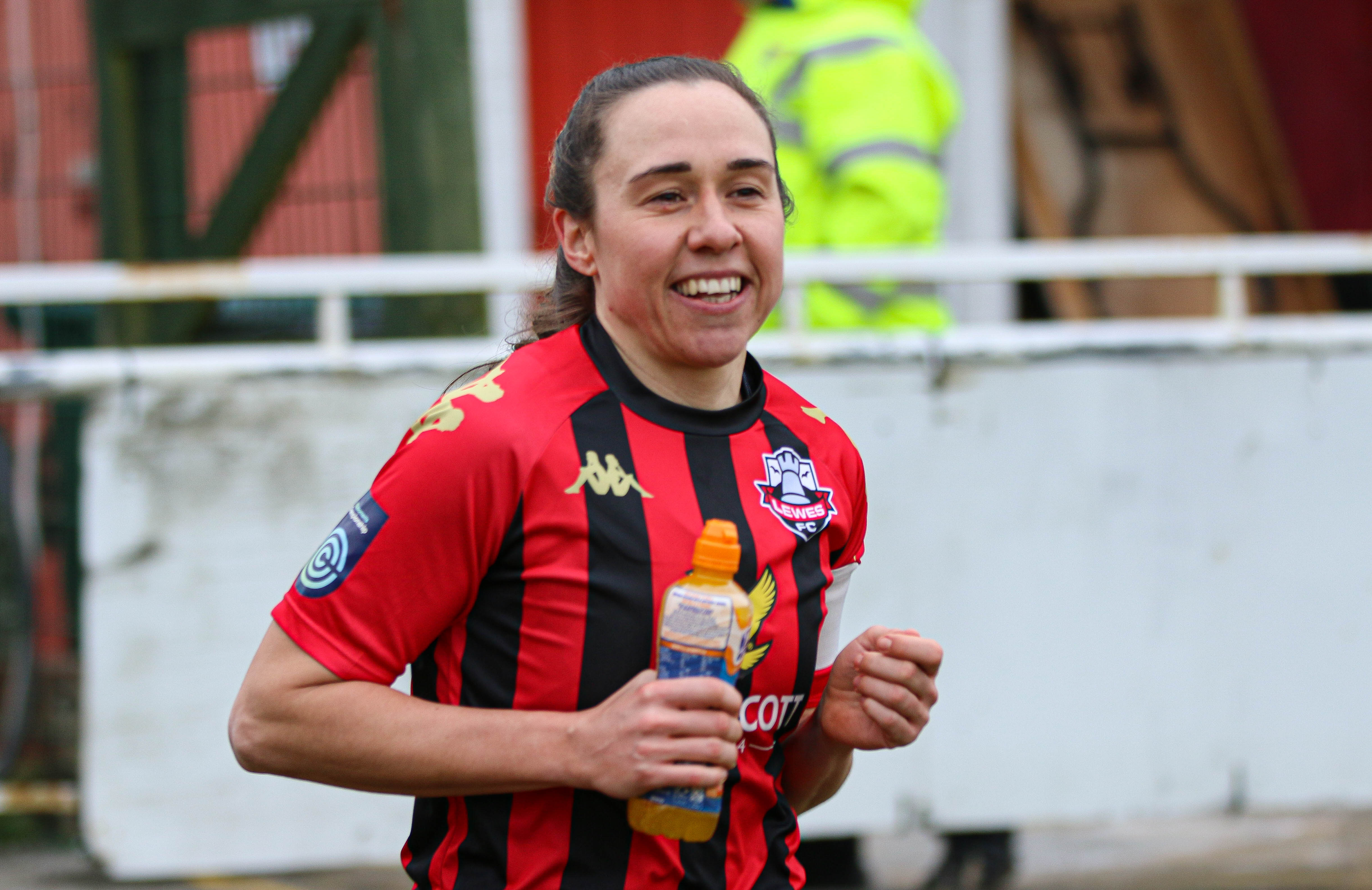
- Cleverly playing for Lewes in 2021

Personal information
- Full name: Rhian Elin Cleverly
- Date of birth: 11 January 1995 (age 31)
- Place of birth: Griffithstown, Wales
- Height: 5 ft 5 in (1.65 m)
- Positions: Defender; midfielder

Team information
- Current team: Rugby Borough
- Number: 6

Youth career
- Mardy Tigers
- 2010–2014: Bristol Academy

College career
Years	Team	Apps	(Gls)
2014–2017	Hofstra Pride	64	(1)

Senior career*
Years	Team	Apps	(Gls)
2016	Bristol City	1	(0)
2018–2019	Le Havre	20	(3)
2019–2024	Lewes	29	(2)
2024–	Rugby Borough		

International career
- Wales U16
	Wales U17	9	(0)
2012–13	Wales U19	6	(0)
2014	Wales	1	(0)
- * Club domestic league appearances and goals as of 16:11, 11 May 2021 (UTC)

Rhian Cleverly (born 11 January 1995) is a Welsh footballer who plays as defender and midfielder for Rugby Borough. She has a single appearance with the Wales national team.

== Early life, youth and college career ==
Cleverly was born in Griffithstown. She joined the Bristol Academy (now Bristol City W.F.C.) Centre of Excellence. At Bristol, Cleverly progressed through the academy and youth ranks, and captained the reserved side to an FA Reserve Cup title in 2013. She also played for her secondary school, West Monmouth School in Torfaen, South Wales.

Cleverly played for the women's soccer team at Hofstra University in the United States from 2013 to 2017, and was named to Colonial Athletic Association all-rookie team in 2014. She finished her collegiate career with 64 appearances and 1 goal. While at Hofstra, she returned to Bristol for a short spell in 2016.

== Senior career ==
Following graduation from Hofstra, Cleverly joined Le Havre (HAC) in the French 2nd division in June 2018. She started 19 of her 20 league appearances, scoring three goals, and added two more appearances in the Coupe de France Féminine.

In July 2019, Cleverly joined Lewes in the FA Women's Championship after leaving Le Havre. and thinking that was the end of her professional football career. She made 11 starts in 12 matches of the 2019–20 season. In the 2020 offseason, Cleverly signed a new two-year contract and was named the senior team captain for the 2019–20 season. She scored her first goal for Lewes in a 1–0 win against Coventry United on 27 September 2020.

In 2021 her record as a player led Lewes to sign a new deal with her and her team mate Tatiana Saunders. Cleverly continued as Lewes's captain and joined the club's hall of fame in 2023. She re-signed for another year at Lewes.

== International career ==
Cleverly has represented Wales through the youth levels and played at the 2013 UEFA Women's Under-19 Championship. She earned her first senior cap for Wales in July 2014.
