= Edward Thomas Chapman =

Recipient of the Victoria Cross

- Born: 13 January 1920; Pontlottyn, Glamorgan
- Died: 3 February 2002 (aged 82); New Inn
- Burial place: Panteg cemetery
- Military career
- Allegiance: United Kingdom
- Branch: British Army
- Service years: 1940–1957
- Rank: Company Sergeant Major
- Service number: 4080657
- Units: Monmouthshire Regiment
- Conflicts: Second World War
- Awards: Victoria Cross; British Empire Medal

Company Sergeant Major Edward Thomas Chapman VC, BEM (13 January 1920 – 3 February 2002) was a Welsh recipient of the Victoria Cross, the highest award for gallantry in the face of the enemy that can be awarded to British and Commonwealth forces.

== Early life ==
Ted Chapman was born in Pontlottyn, near Rhymney, the son of a coal miner. He left school at age 14 and like many of his generation followed his father underground at the Ogilvie Colliery.

He enlisted in the British Army in April 1940, during the Second World War, joining the Monmouthshire Regiment and seeing action from his battalion's landing shortly after the D-Day landings of 6 June 1944 through the advance into North-west Europe. He was wounded at Falaise in the breakout from the Normandy bridgehead.

== Details ==
Chapman was 25 years old, and a corporal in the 3rd Battalion, Monmouthshire Regiment, British Army during the Second World War when the following action took place for which he was awarded the VC.

On 2 April 1945, near the Dortmund-Ems canal, Germany, Corporal Chapman's section came under heavy machine-gun fire from German units dug in and concealed, causing many casualties. He ordered his men to take cover and went forward alone with a Bren gun, mowing down the enemy at point-blank range, forcing them to retire. His section isolated, Corporal Chapman again halted the enemy advances with his Bren gun, at one time firing it over his shoulder while lying supine on his back in a shallow fold in the ground, to cover those bringing him ammunition. He then carried in his Company Commander, an officer, who was lying wounded, but on the way back the officer was killed by further German fire and Corporal Chapman wounded in the thigh. Refusing hospitalisation he returned to his section and ensured the consolidation of the ground gained which took a further two hours of fighting.

== Honours and awards ==
- 13 July 1945 – Teutoburger Wald, Germany, 2 April 1945, Corporal Edward Thomas Chapman, 3rd Bn, Monmouthshire Regiment:

On 2nd April 1945, a Company of the Monmouthshire Regiment crossed the Dortmund- Ems canal and was ordered to assault the ridge of the Teutoberger Wald, which dominates the surrounding country. This ridge is steep thickly wooded and is ideal defensive country. It was, moreover, defended by a battalion of German officer cadets and their instructors, all of them picked men and fanatical Nazis.

Corporal Chapman was advancing with his section in single file along a narrow track when the enemy suddenly opened fire with machine guns at short range, inflicting heavy casualties and causing some confusion. Corporal Chapman immediately ordered his section to take cover and, seizing the Bren gun, he advanced alone, firing the gun from his hip, and mowed down the enemy at point blank range, forcing them to retire in disorder. At this point, however, his Company was ordered to withdraw but Corporal Chapman and his section were still left in their advanced position, as the order could not be got forward to them.

The enemy then began to close up to Corporal Chapman and his isolated section and, under cover of intense machine gun fire, they made determined charges with the bayonet. Corporal Chapman again rose with his Bren gun to meet the assaults and on each occasion halted their advance. He had now nearly run out of ammunition. Shouting to his section for more bandoliers, he dropped into a fold in the ground and covered those bringing up the ammunition by lying on his back and firing the Bren gun over his shoulder.

A party of Germans made every effort to eliminate him with grenades, but with reloaded magazine he closed with them and once again drove the enemy back with considerable casualties. During the withdrawal of his Company, the Company Commander had been severely wounded and left lying in the open a short distance from Corporal Chapman.

Satisfied that his section was now secure, at any rate for the moment, he went out alone under withering fire and carried his Company Commander for 50 yards to comparative safety. On the way a sniper hit the officer again, wounding Corporal Chapman in the hip and, when he reached our lines, it was discovered that the officer had been killed. In spite of his wound, Corporal Chapman refused to be evacuated and went back to his Company until the position was fully restored two hours later.

Throughout the action Corporal Chapman displayed outstanding gallantry and superb courage. Single-handed he repulsed the attacks of well-led, determined troops and gave his battalion time to reorganise on a vital piece of ground overlooking the only bridge across the canal. His magnificent bravery played a very large part in the capture of this vital ridge and in the successful development of subsequent operations.

== Later life ==
He later achieved the rank of company sergeant major. In the 1953 Coronation Honours, he was awarded the British Empire Medal. He lived in New Inn, Torfaen until his death on 3 February 2002 aged 82, and is buried in Panteg cemetery near New Inn. He worked at ICI Fibres at Pontypool for 25 years. He was a noted breeder of Welsh Mountain Ponies which he exhibited and showed at the Royal Welsh Show at Builth Wells.
