= Panteg and Griffithstown railway station =

Former railway station in Wales

Coordinates: 51.6842°N 3.0217°W

Panteg and Griffithstown

General information
- Location: Griffithstown, Torfaen; Wales
- Grid reference: ST294989
- Platforms: 2

Other information
- Status: Disused

History
- Original company: Great Western Railway
- Pre-grouping: Great Western Railway
- Post-grouping: Great Western Railway

Key dates
- 1 August 1880: Opened as "Panteg"
- 20 October 1898: Renamed
- 30 April 1962: Closed to passengers
- 3 May 1965: Closed to goods
Location

Panteg and Griffithstown railway station was a railway station which served Griffithstown near Pontypool in Torfaen, South Wales, UK.

== History ==
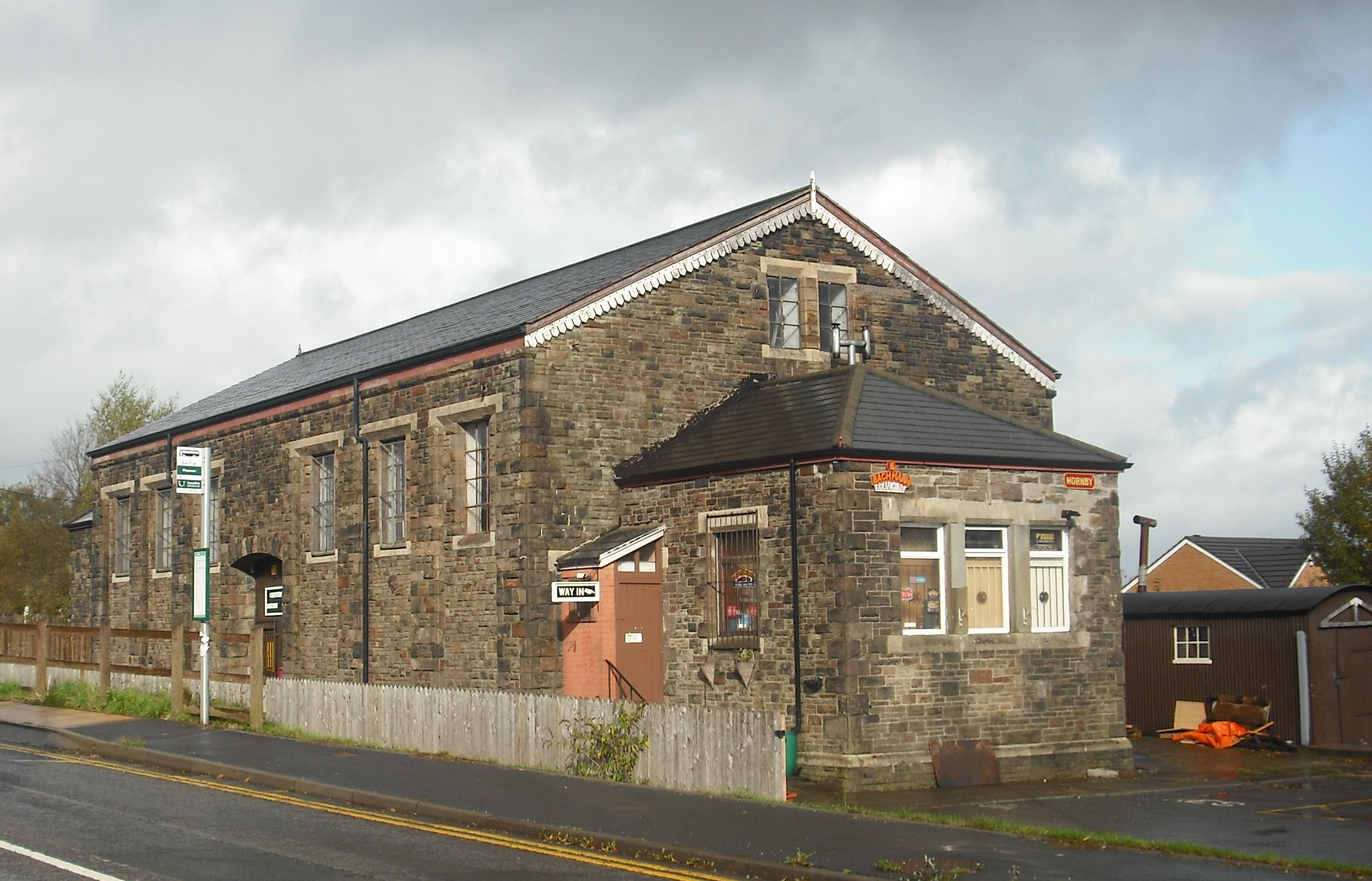
The goods shed, south of the station, which was home to a railway museum in the 2000s.

The station was opened by the Great Western Railway on 1 August 1880 on the line of the Monmouthshire Railway and Canal Company from Pontypool to Newport. Originally known as "Panteg", it was renamed "Panteg and Griffithstown" on 20 October 1898. The station had replaced an earlier station serving the area on the parallel Pontypool, Caerleon and Newport Railway to the east, which had opened in 1874. The second station closed to passengers on 30 April 1962 and to goods on 3 May 1965.

The platforms at the station were staggered and joined by a central footbridge. To the south was the goods shed, built in 1879, and from 2002 to 2011 the home of the Griffithstown Railway Museum. The station was adjacent to the Panteg Steel Works, with sidings into the site. The works were also served from the Pontypool, Caerleon and Newport Railway line. To the north of the station was Coedygric Junction between the N&PR and PC&NR lines, and the southernmost part of the railway yard complex at Pontypool.

The trackbed has been redeveloped into a cycle path, and the steelworks have been demolished and replaced by housing. As of 2019, the 'up' platform and buildings, which were derelict, have been demolished.

In 2015 it was announced that the Dean Forest Railway planned to demolish the main station building and reconstruct it for use at a station on the future northern extension of their line which runs between Lydney Junction and Parkend in the Forest of Dean. The project to remove the building was estimated to require £20,000 of funding. The building was removed in May 2016.
