= Griffithstown Railway Museum =

Coordinates: 51.695833°N 3.025833°W

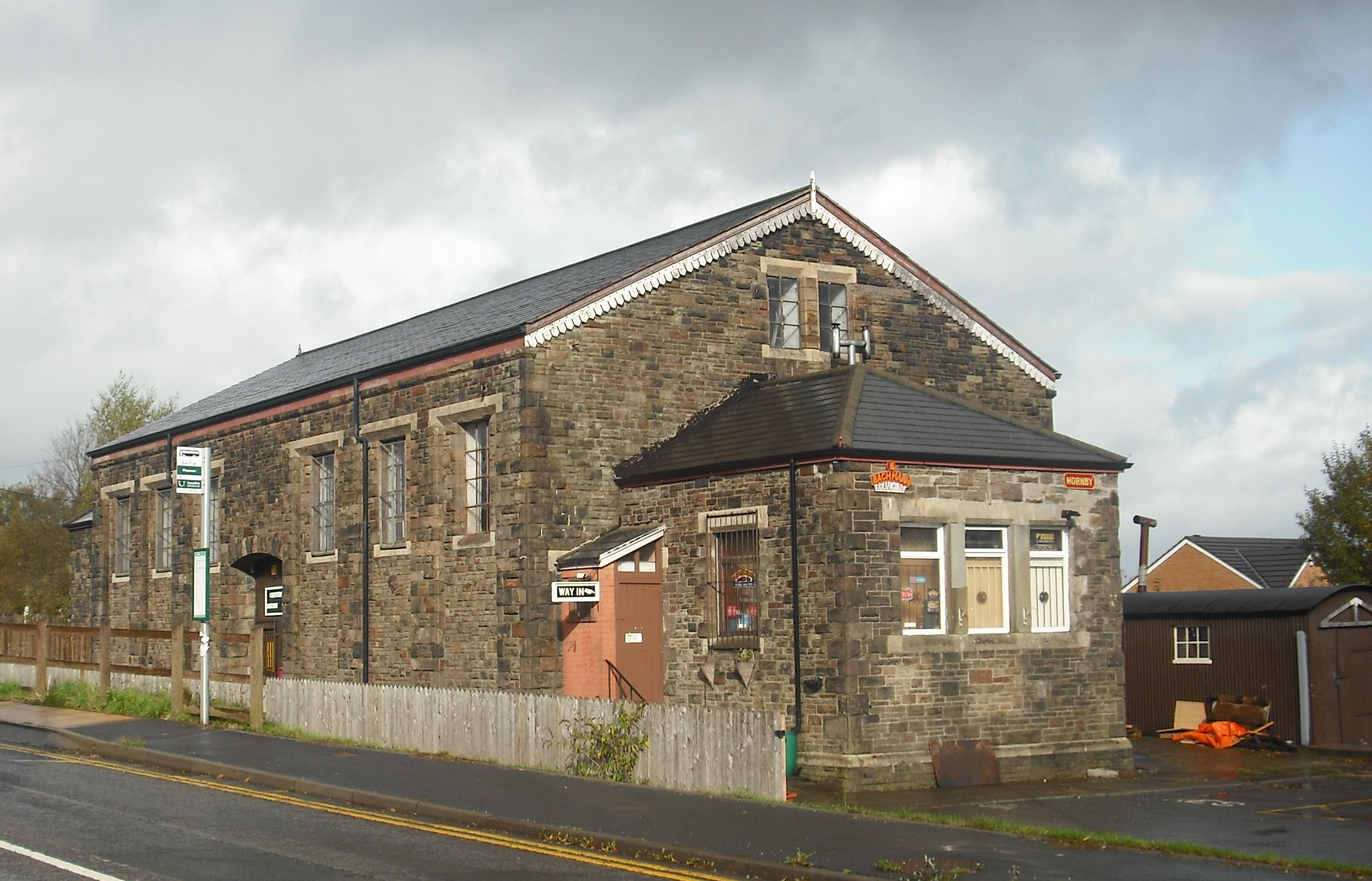
The goods shed building

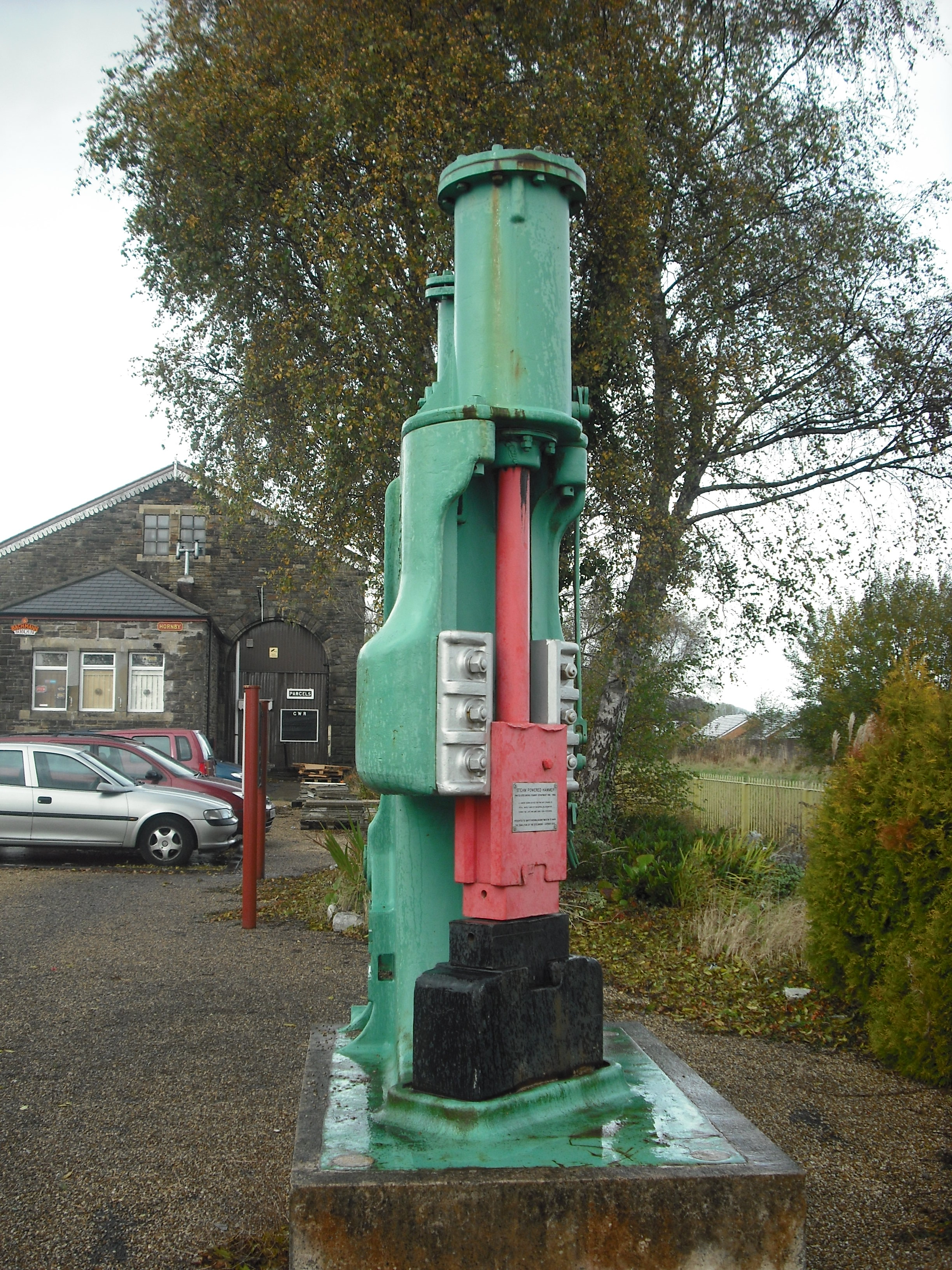
Steam hammer from the nearby Panteg steelworks, closed 2004

Griffithstown Railway Museum was a railway memorabilia museum located in Griffithstown, Torfaen, South Wales. It was housed in a former Great Western Railway goods shed dating from 1879, adjacent to the former Panteg and Griffithstown railway station.

Local railwayana collector Martin Fay owned and ran the museum. He purchased the former goods shed, which was in a derelict state, and following renovation opened the museum to the public in 2002. However, in January 2011 financial pressures led to its closure. It has since been converted into a preschool.

The museum was located in the village of Griffithstown - named after Henry Griffiths the first stationmaster of Pontypool Road Station and was also the birthplace of ASLEF - the Associated Society of Locomotive Engineers & Firemen - in 1880.

The area around the museum received £35,000 of funding from a local property developer and the Welsh Assembly Government through the Department for Enterprise, Innovation and Networks. This money was used to improve the general landscape around the museum and provide better car parking for visitors. Although the plaque on the forging hammer in front of the museum states that it is a 'Steam Hammer', it is in fact a self-contained MASSEY 7cwt pneumatic forging hammer.
