= Panteg Cemetery =

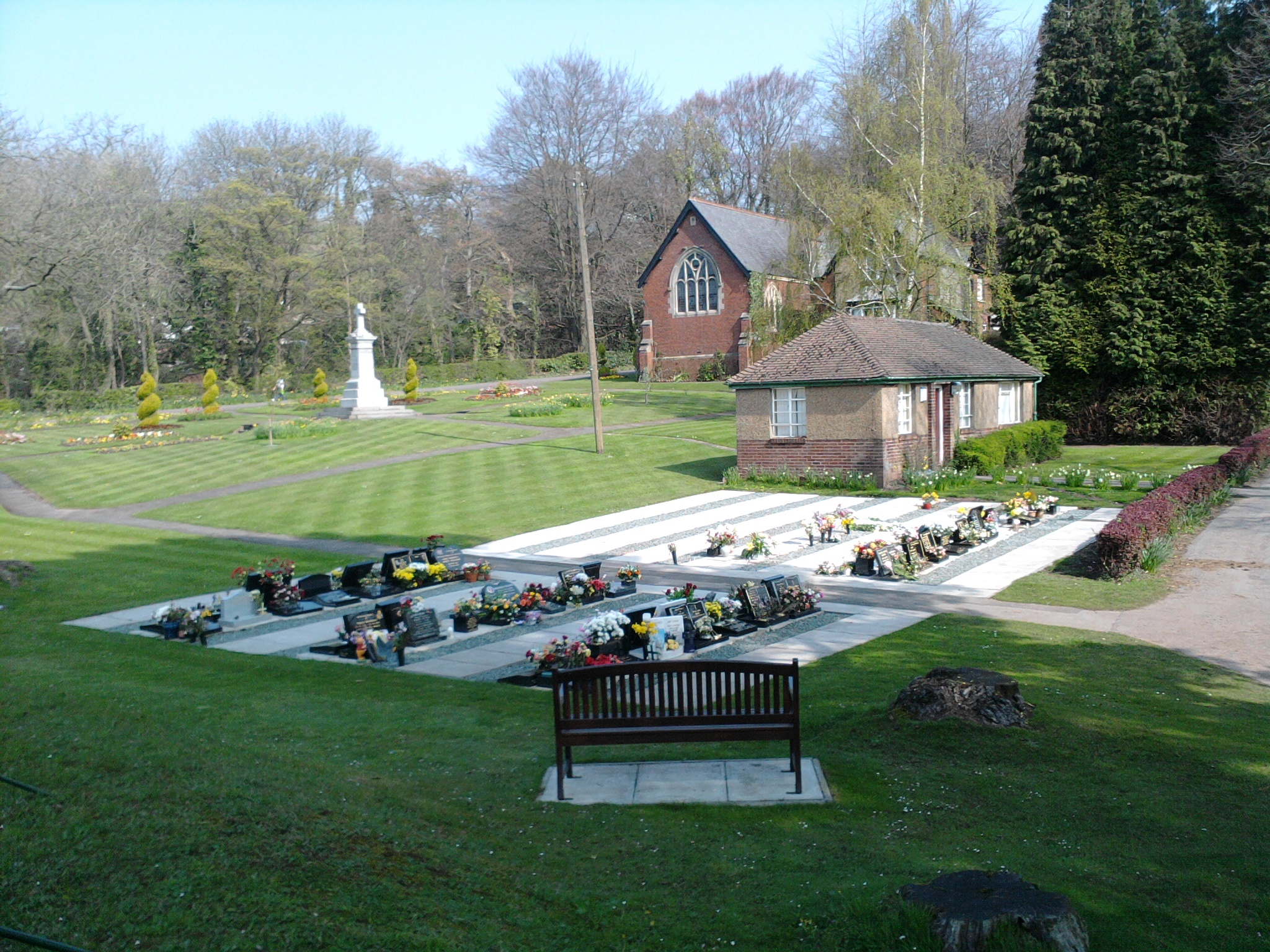
- Panteg Cemetery - war memorial and garden of remembrance
- Interactive map of Panteg Cemetery

Details
- Established: 1906
- Location: Torfaen, Wales
- Country: United Kingdom
- Coordinates: 51.698°N 3.019°W
- Size: 20 acres (8.1 ha)
- Find a Grave: Panteg Cemetery

Panteg Cemetery is one of the four principal cemeteries in the borough of Torfaen, Wales, the other three being at Blaenavon, Llwyncelyn and Cwmbran. It covers an area of approximately 20 acres. The first interment took place on 23 July 1906. A Garden of Remembrance is located within the grounds.

== Location ==
The cemetery is accessed directly from the main road, The Highway, which runs from the Turnpike (the colloquial name for the junction of Usk Road and The Highway) down through the village of New Inn. It is bordered to the north by the Monmouthshire and Brecon Canal, to the east by the A4042 dual carriageway, to the south by the Coed-y-Cando housing estate, and to the west by The Highway.

The cemetery contains a memorial to 156 people who lost their lives during the First World War. There are also 37 recognised Commonwealth war graves within the cemetery, 16 from the First World War and 21 from the Second World War.

== Notable interments ==
- Edward Thomas Chapman (1920–2002), recipient of the Victoria Cross
