= Griffithstown =

Coordinates: 51.68525°N 3.02842°W

- Location within Torfaen
- Population: 5,450
- OS grid reference: ST290990
- Community: Panteg
- Principal area: Torfaen
- Preserved county: Gwent
- Country: Wales
- Sovereign state: United Kingdom
- Post town: PONTYPOOL
- Postcode district: NP4
- Dialling code: 01495
- Police: Gwent
- Fire: South Wales
- Ambulance: Welsh
- UK Parliament: Torfaen

Griffithstown is a large suburb of Pontypool in the borough of Torfaen, Wales, within the historic boundaries of Monmouthshire. It is an ecclesiastical parish, formed in May 1898, from Llanfrechfa Upper and Panteg, and includes Sebastopol, but, under the provisions of the Local Government Act 1894, became a separate civil parish.

It is situated between two other Pontypool suburbs: Pontymoile to the north and Sebastopol to the south and is within walking distance of Pontypool and Cwmbran and a short commute from Newport and Cardiff. It is named after the first station master of Pontypool and New Inn railway station (then known as Pontypool Road), Henry Griffiths. Griffiths founded a 'terminating' Building Society to finance the construction of houses in the village so that his workforce could become freehold owner-occupiers, rather than constructing rental or leasehold housing as was the more usual practice in industrial South Wales and Monmouthshire. He lived in the substantial St. Dunstan's House (now demolished) on what is now Commercial Street and his memorial is in St Hilda's Church. Today the site is occupied by a nursing home and a modern house of the same name.

== The village ==
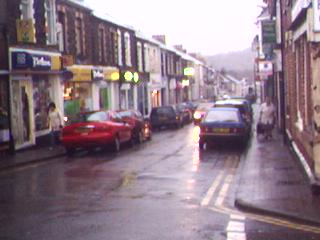
Windsor Road, the main shopping area of the village

This area contains mostly Victorian and Edwardian terraced houses and is located below Sunnybank Road on the east side of the town. The area includes the shopping precinct of Windsor Road; Griffithstown Primary School and the Welsh-medium Ysgol Panteg (the town's secondary school needs are met by nearby West Monmouth School in Pontypool); St Hilda's Church (Anglican), Griffithstown Baptist Church; Griffithstown Congregational Chapel as well as numerous pubs, like the famous Hanbury Hotel, and the Great Western Railway Staff Association club (GWRSA). County Hospital is also located here, as is Panteg Medical Centre.

=== St Hilda's Church ===
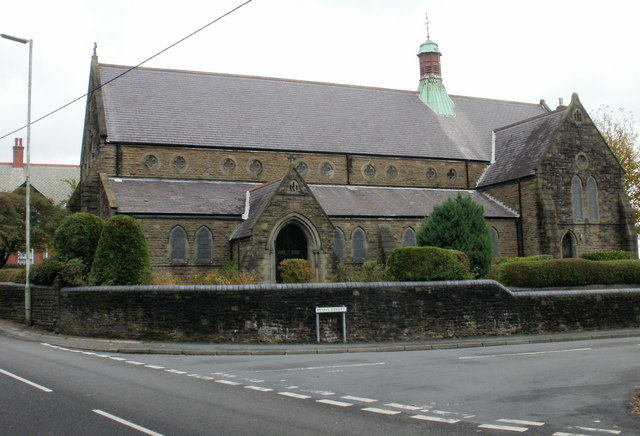
St Hilda's Church

St Hilda's Church is the Church in Wales parish church of Griffithstown. It stands on the corner of Kemys Street and Sunnybank Road (formerly Church Road). It is dedicated to Saint Hilda of Whitby and was built in 1887–1888 to the designs of E. M. Bruce Vaughan. A tablet inside commemorates Henry Griffiths as church warden. The church originally served as a chapel of ease to Holy Trinity Church in the historical parish of Llanfrechfa Upper. The church meets the needs of Anglican worship in Griffithstown but also the wider community, including Pontypool.

There is a vicarage, built later than the church itself, adjacent to the church on Sunnybank Road. The first vicar was Rev Mr James Dunn, who was also chaplain of the Union Workhouse on Coedygric Road (now County Hospital) and an alumnus of University of Wales, Lampeter.

== Western Griffithstown ==
This area above Sunnybank Road has some fine Victorian and Edwardian buildings but is mostly made up of 1960s and 1970s estate housing. The area is considered to be highly desirable and affluent with property prices here being some of the highest in the Torfaen borough.

== Education ==
- Griffithstown Primary School
- Ysgol Panteg (Welsh Medium Education Primary School)

== Parkland and countryside ==
The town has two principal parks and one parkland estate known as Panteg House (home of Panteg Cricket Club, Panteg Football Club, Panteg House Bowls Club and Pontypool Boules team). Griffithstown Park near Sunnybank Road contains an adventure playground and basketball courts, but is mostly grass. Panteg Park on Cwrdy Road (known as "The Fish Pond Park" due to its water feature) is smaller with elaborate flower gardens, bowling green, tennis courts and golf putting greens. Panteg House is home to a cricket pitch and football pitch. It also has a bowling green.

Griffithstown Park has recently undergone great investment and development, with the introduction of an enclosed basketball court and a five-a-side pitch.

The Monmouthshire & Brecon Canal runs through Griffithstown on its way to Newport via Cwmbran. National Cycle Route 46 runs along the disused trackbed of the Newport and Pontypool Railway. Panteg and Griffithstown railway station was closed to passengers in 1962 and the line was closed in 1980. Remains of the station and goods shed are still present. From 2002 to 2011 the goods shed was home to Griffithstown Railway Museum.

== Expansion ==
Griffithstown has experienced several phases of housing development during the 1990s and into the 2000s with housing estates such as Museum Court, Open Hearth Close, Churchwood estate and Parc Panteg appearing. The majority of these are on the brownfield land that was formerly the Panteg Steel Works on the southeastern edge of Griffithstown.

== Notable people ==
- Rhian Cleverly, footballer
- Ellie Curson, footballer
- Annabel Giles, television and radio presenter
