= Torfaen (UK Parliament constituency) =

UK Parliament constituency (since 1983)

Coordinates: 51.696°N 3.063°W

- County constituency for the House of Commons
- Interactive map of the constituency.
- Location of the constituency within Wales
- Preserved county: Gwent
- Electorate: 70,591 (March 2020)
- Major settlements: Cwmbran, Pontypool, Blaenavon

Current constituency
- Created: 1983
- Member of Parliament: Nick Thomas-Symonds (Labour)
- Seats: One
- Created from: Pontypool

Overlaps
- Senedd: Sir Fynwy Torfaen

Torfaen is a constituency (Note: A county constituency (for the purposes of election expenses and type of returning officer)) in Wales represented in the House of Commons of the UK Parliament since 2015 by Nick Thomas-Symonds, a member of the Labour Party who served as Paymaster General and Minister for the Cabinet Office in the government of Keir Starmer from 2024 to 2026. (Note: As with all constituencies, the constituency elects one Member of Parliament (MP) by the first past the post system of election at least every five years.) It was established for the 1983 general election.

The constituency retained its name and gained wards as part of the 2023 review of Westminster constituencies and under the June 2023 final recommendations of the Boundary Commission for Wales for the 2024 general election.

== Boundaries ==
1983–2024: The Borough of Torfaen, excluding the communities of Croesyceiliog and Llanyrafon which were part of the Monmouth constituency.

2024–present: Under the 2023 review, the constituency was defined as being composed of the whole of the County Borough of Torfaen, with Croesyceiliog and Llanyrafon being transferred from the now abolished constituency of Monmouth, which was replaced by Monmouthshire.

The constituency covers the new town of Cwmbran, Pontypool, and its surrounding districts and stretches as far north as Blaenavon.

== History ==
The area is traditionally a Labour Party stronghold with a majority of around 9,000. The community of New Inn is the only strong Conservative area. It voted Labour even amidst the huge Conservative majorities of 1983 and 1987. However, 2019 saw the lowest Labour majority in Torfaen in the seat's history, of only 3,742 votes, in part due to 60.8% of voters choosing the Leave vote in the 2016 EU membership referendum. In the 2024 United Kingdom general election Labour increased their majority to 7,322 votes.

== Members of Parliament ==
Election	Member	Party
1983	Leo Abse	Labour
1987	Paul Murphy	Labour
2015	Nick Thomas-Symonds	Labour

== Elections ==
=== Elections in the 2020s ===
General election 2024: Torfaen
Party	Candidate	Votes	%	±%
Labour	Nick Thomas-Symonds	15,176	42.5	−0.2
Reform	Ian Williams	7,854	22.0	+8.8
Conservative	Nathan Edmunds	5,737	16.1	−17.2
Plaid Cymru	Matthew Jones	2,571	7.2	+3.6
Green	Philip Davies	1,705	4.8	+2.6
Liberal Democrats	Brendan Roberts	1,644	4.6	−0.4
Independent	Lee Dunning	881	2.5	N/A
Heritage	Nikki Brooke	137	0.4	N/A
Majority		7,322	20.5	+11.1
Turnout		35,705	49.9	−11.8
Registered electors		71,738		
Labour hold		Swing	−4.5	

=== Elections in the 2010s ===
2019 notional result (Note: Estimate of the 2019 general election result as if the revised boundaries recommended under the 2023 boundary review were in place)
Party	Vote	%
Labour	18,616	42.7
Conservative	14,506	33.3
Brexit Party	5,742	13.2
Liberal Democrats	2,157	5.0
Plaid Cymru	1,566	3.6
Green Party	966	2.2
Majority	4,110	9.4
Turnout	43,553	61.7
Electorate	70,591	

General election 2019: Torfaen
Party	Candidate	Votes	%	±%
Labour	Nick Thomas-Symonds	15,546	41.8	−15.8
Conservative	Graham Smith	11,804	31.8	+0.8
Brexit Party	David Thomas	5,742	15.4	N/A
Liberal Democrats	John Miller	1,831	4.9	+2.7
Plaid Cymru	Morgan Bowler-Brown	1,441	3.9	−1.5
Green	Andrew Heygate-Browne	812	2.2	N/A
Rejected ballots		126		
Majority		3,742	10.0	−16.6
Turnout		37,176	60.2	−2.0
Registered electors		61,743		
Labour hold		Swing	−8.3	

Of the 126 rejected ballots:

- 100 were either unmarked or it was uncertain whom the vote was for.
- 26 voted for more than one candidate.

General election 2017: Torfaen
Party	Candidate	Votes	%	±%
Labour	Nick Thomas-Symonds	22,134	57.6	+13.0
Conservative	Graham Smith	11,894	31.0	+7.9
Plaid Cymru	Jeff Rees	2,059	5.4	−0.3
UKIP	Ian Williams	1,490	3.9	−15.1
Liberal Democrats	Andrew Best	852	2.2	−1.2
Rejected ballots		62		
Majority		10,240	26.6	+5.1
Turnout		38,494	62.2	+0.9
Registered electors		61,839		
Labour hold		Swing	+2.5	

Of the 62 rejected ballots:

- 39 were either unmarked or it was uncertain whom the vote was for.
- 23 voted for more than one candidate.

General election 2015: Torfaen
Party	Candidate	Votes	%	±%
Labour	Nick Thomas-Symonds	16,938	44.6	−0.2
Conservative	Graham Smith	8,769	23.1	+3.1
UKIP	Ken Beswick	7,203	19.0	+16.7
Plaid Cymru	Boydd Hackley-Green	2,169	5.7	+0.4
Liberal Democrats	Alison Willott	1,271	3.4	−13.2
Green	Matt Cooke	746	2.0	+0.8
Socialist Labour	John Cox	697	1.8	N/A
Communist	Mark Griffiths	144	0.4	N/A
Rejected ballots		68		
Majority		8,169	21.5	−3.3
Turnout		37,937	61.3	−0.2
Registered electors		61,896		
Labour hold		Swing	−1.6	

Of the 68 rejected ballots:

- 47 were either unmarked or it was uncertain whom the vote was for.
- 21 voted for more than one candidate.

General election 2010: Torfaen
Party	Candidate	Votes	%	±%
Labour	Paul Murphy	16,847	44.8	−12.1
Conservative	Jonathan H. Burns	7,541	20.0	+4.2
Liberal Democrats	David P. Morgan	6,264	16.6	+0.8
Plaid Cymru	Rhys G. ab Elis	2,005	5.3	−0.9
BNP	Jennifer Noble	1,657	4.4	N/A
Independent	Fred Wildgust	1,419	3.8	N/A
UKIP	Gareth Dunn	862	2.3	−0.9
Independent	Richard Turner-Thomas	607	1.6	−0.5
Green	Owen Clarke	438	1.2	N/A
Rejected ballots		46		
Majority		9,306	24.8	−16.3
Turnout		37,640	61.5	+2.2
Registered electors		61,183		
Labour hold		Swing	−8.2	

Of the 46 rejected ballots:

- 26 were either unmarked or it was uncertain whom the vote was for.
- 19 voted for more than one candidate.
- 1 had writing or mark by which the voter could be identified.

=== Elections in the 2000s ===
General election 2005: Torfaen
Party	Candidate	Votes	%	±%
Labour	Paul Murphy	20,472	56.9	−5.2
Conservative	Nick Ramsay	5,681	15.8	−0.1
Liberal Democrats	Veronica Watkins	5,678	15.8	+4.6
Plaid Cymru	Aneurin Preece	2,242	6.2	−1.5
UKIP	David Rowlands	1,145	3.2	+1.3
Independent	Richard Turner-Thomas	761	2.1	N/A
Majority		14,791	41.1	−5.1
Turnout		35,979	59.3	+1.6
Registered electors		60,665		
Labour hold		Swing	−2.5	

General election 2001: Torfaen
Party	Candidate	Votes	%	±%
Labour	Paul Murphy	21,883	62.1	−7.0
Conservative	Jason Evans	5,603	15.9	+3.6
Liberal Democrats	Alan Masters	3,936	11.2	−0.9
Plaid Cymru	Stephen Smith	2,720	7.7	+5.3
UKIP	Brenda Vipass	657	1.9	N/A
Socialist Alliance	Stephen Bell	443	1.3	N/A
Majority		16,280	46.2	−10.4
Turnout		35,242	57.7	−14.0
Registered electors		61,115		
Labour hold		Swing	−5.3	

=== Elections in the 1990s ===
General election 1997: Torfaen
Party	Candidate	Votes	%	±%
Labour	Paul Murphy	29,863	69.1	+5.0
Conservative	Neil Parish	5,327	12.3	−8.0
Liberal Democrats	Jean Gray	5,249	12.1	−1.0
Referendum	Deborah Holler	1,245	2.9	N/A
Plaid Cymru	Robert Gough	1,042	2.4	−0.2
Green	Roger Coghill	519	1.2	N/A
Majority		24,536	56.8	+13.0
Turnout		43,245	71.7	−5.8
Registered electors		60,343		
Labour hold		Swing	+6.5	

General election 1992: Torfaen
Party	Candidate	Votes	%	±%
Labour	Paul Murphy	30,352	64.1	+5.4
Conservative	Mark Watkins	9,598	20.3	+1.2
Liberal Democrats	Malcolm Hewson	6,178	13.1	−6.8
Plaid Cymru (Green)	John Cox	1,210	2.6	+1.4
Majority		20,754	43.8	+5.0
Turnout		47,338	77.5	+1.9
Registered electors		61,104		
Labour hold		Swing	+2.1	

=== Elections in the 1980s ===
General election 1987: Torfaen
Party	Candidate	Votes	%	±%
Labour	Paul Murphy	26,577	58.7	+11.4
Liberal	Graham Blackburn	9,027	19.9	−8.4
Conservative	Robert Gordon	8,632	19.1	−3.2
Plaid Cymru	Jill Evans	577	1.2	−0.9
Green	Melvin John Witherden	450	1.0	N/A
Majority		17,550	38.8	+19.8
Turnout		45,263	75.6	+1.2
Registered electors		59,896		
Labour hold		Swing	+9.9	

General election 1983: Torfaen
Party	Candidate	Votes	%	±%
Labour	Leo Abse	20,678	47.3	
Liberal	Graham Blackburn	12,393	28.3	
Conservative	Peter Martin	9,751	22.3	
Plaid Cymru	Phyllis Cox	896	2.1	
Majority		8,285	19.0	
Turnout		43,718	74.4	
Registered electors		58,739		
Labour win (new seat)				

== See also ==
- Torfaen (Senedd constituency)
- List of parliamentary constituencies in Gwent
- List of parliamentary constituencies in Wales
